= Qiannang =

- Village
- Location within Tibet
- Coordinates: 29°43′34″N 91°5′8″E
- Country: China
- Region: Tibet Autonomous Region
- Prefecture: Lhasa Prefecture

Qiannang is a village in the Lhasa Prefecture of Tibet Autonomous Region, People's Republic of China. It is located northwest of the city of Lhasa. The smaller village of Jiareguo is located just to the southwest of the village.
