= Nimu Maqu River =

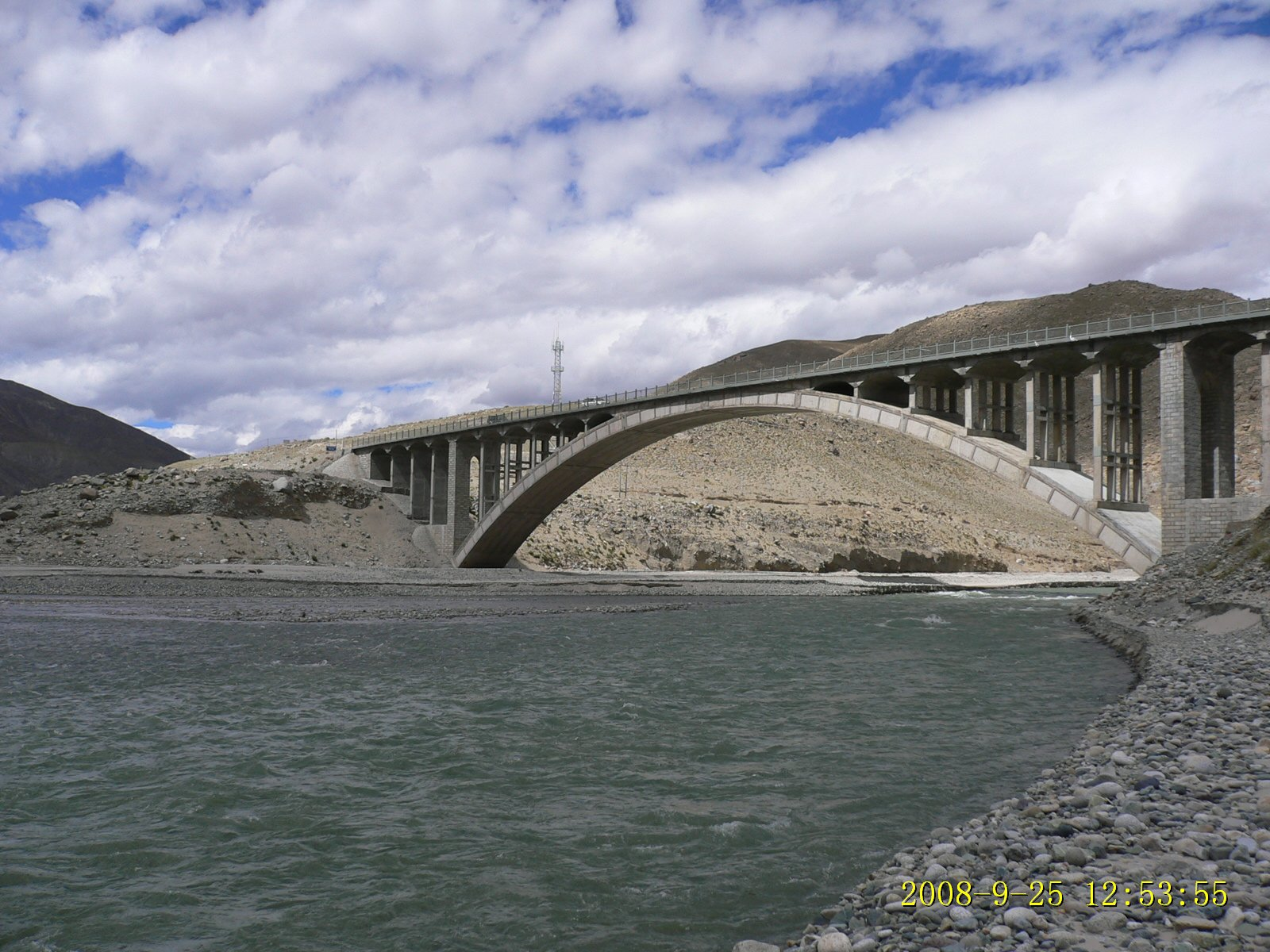
- Nimu river bridge at its confluence with the Yarlung Tsangpo River

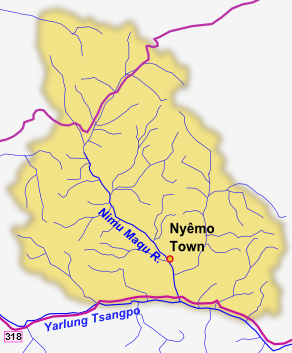
- Nimu Maqu River in Nyêmo County

Location
- Country: China
- Region: Tibet
- City: Lhasa
- County: Nyêmo County

Physical characteristics
- Source
  - elevation: 7,048 m (23,123 ft)
- Mouth
  - coordinates: 29.347574°N 90.192174°E
- Length: 83 km (52 mi)
- Discharge
  - average: 11.9 m^{3}/s (420 cu ft/s)

Basin features
- River system: Yarlung Tsangpo River

The Nimu Maqu River (Chinese: 尼木玛曲) is a left tributary of the Yarlung Tsangpo River (upper Brahmaputra) that flows south through Nyêmo County in Lhasa Municipality, Tibet, China.

== Course ==
The Nimu Maqu is the main river of Nyêmo County and an important tributary of the Yarlung Tsangpo. The river is 83 kilometres (52 mi) long. It rises at 7,048 metres (23,123 ft) in the north of the county, and runs south through the whole length of the county. The Nimu Maqu empties into the Yarlung Tsangpo from the north at an elevation of 3,701 metres (12,142 ft). The valley is 5 kilometres (3.1 mi) wide in its widest section, which contains the county seat and is the main agricultural area in the county.

== Flow ==
The climate is temperate semi-arid plateau monsoon, with most precipitation falling in the summer. Annual rainfall is 324.2 millimetres (12.76 in). The average flow is 11.9 cubic metres per second (420 cu ft/s) per second, with least flow 4.6 cubic metres per second (160 cu ft/s) and flood flow rates of up to 400 cubic metres per second (14,000 cu ft/s).

== Sources ==
- "Nyêmo County Overview" (in Chinese). Nyêmo County People's Government Office. 15 March 2011. Archived from the original on 14 February 2015.
- "Nyêmo County Rivers: Nimu Maqu". lasajiudian (in Chinese).
