= Namco (disambiguation) =

Namco was a Japanese corporation best known as a producer of video games.

Namco may also refer to:

- Bandai Namco Entertainment, a merger between Namco and Bandai's game development departments
  - Bandai Namco Pictures, a Japanese animation studio split off from Sunrise
- Namco (automobiles), a Greek automobile producer
- Namco Manufacturing, Inc. A Houston, Texas based janitorial supply and equipment company founded 1981.
- Namco, Tibet, a town located about 100km north of Lhasa
- Namtso, also called Namco, a salt lake in Tibet
