= Damxung County =

Damxung 当雄县 • འདམ་གཞུང་རྫོང་།
- County
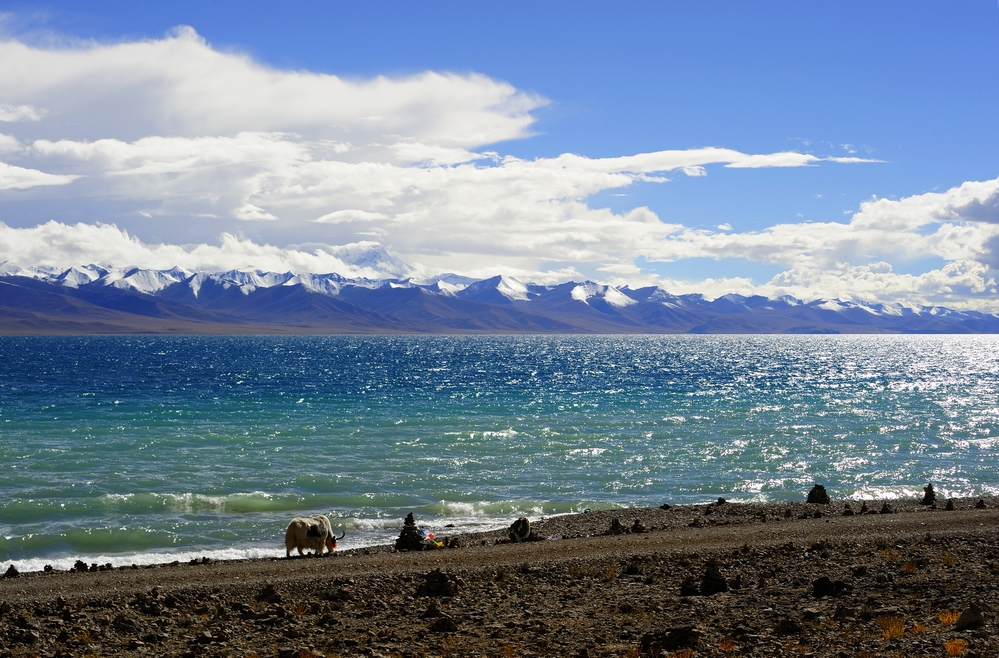
- Namtso

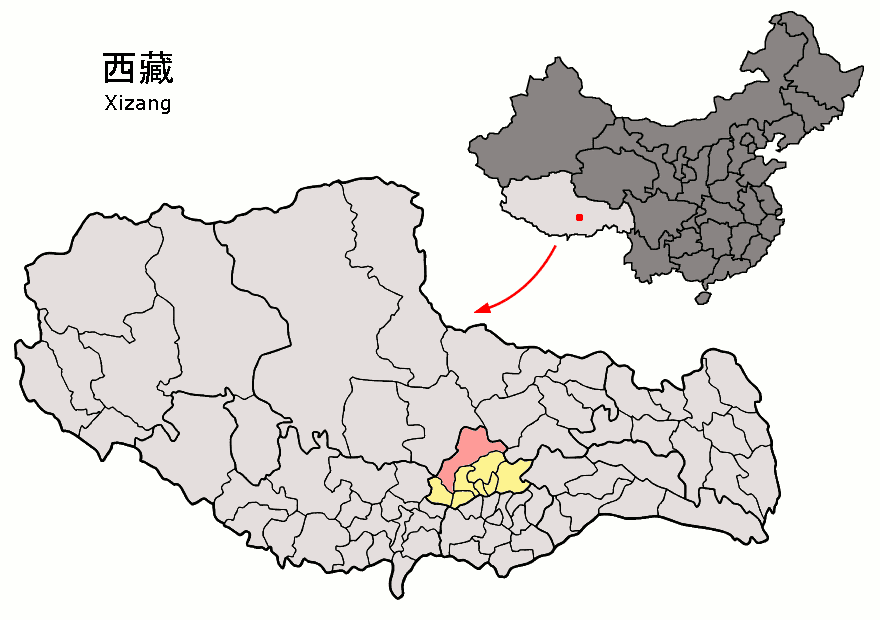
- Location of Damxung County (red) within Lhasa City (yellow) and the Tibet Autonomous Region

- Location in Tibet Damxung (China)
- Coordinates: 30°28′23″N 91°06′04″E
- Country: China
- Autonomous region: Tibet
- Prefecture-level city: Lhasa
- County seat: Damquka

Area
  - Total: 10,036 km^{2} (3,875 sq mi)

Population (2020)
  - Total: 47,900
  - Density: 4.77/km^{2} (12.4/sq mi)
- Time zone: UTC+8 (China Standard)
- Website: www.dangxiong.gov.cn

Damxung County

Chinese name
- Simplified Chinese: 当雄县
- Traditional Chinese: 當雄縣
Transcriptions
Standard Mandarin
- Hanyu Pinyin: Dāngxióng Xiàn

Tibetan name
- Tibetan: འདམ་གཞུང་རྫོང་།
Transcriptions
- Wylie: 'dam gzhung rdzong
- Tibetan Pinyin: Damxung Zong

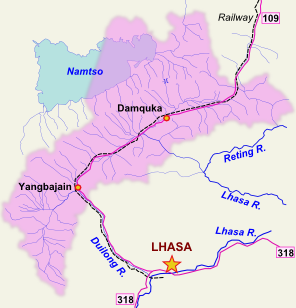
Sketch map showing rivers. Many of the Lhasa River tributaries rise in Damxung.

Damxung is a county of Lhasa City, lying to the north of its main center of Chengguan, in the Tibet Autonomous Region, China. Its administrative seat is Damquka. The terrain is rugged, including the western Nyenchen Tanglha Mountains, with their highest peak rising to 7,111 metres (23,330 ft). As of 2013 the population was 40,000, with most of the people engaged in animal husbandry.

== History ==
Damxung means "select pasture" in the Tibetan language. The Damxung steppe was gifted by the 5th Dalai Lama to Güshi Khan during the latter's reign. A number of Mongol cavalry soldiers settled down in the area, who became known as Mongol Eight Banners of Dam. After Güshi Khan's death in 1679, the area was possessed by Ngakpa Tratsang of Sera Monastery. From 1715 to 1912, the former Mongol Eight Banners land was directly administered by the Qing Dynasty Amban. Following the Qing's collapse, the area once again came under possession of Sera Monastery, which established Damxung Dzong under Domê Chikyab (mdo smad spyi khyab, "Domê Governorate"), predecessor of the modern Chamdo Prefecture. In 1956, the county was transferred to Lhasa City. In 1959, Petsang and Yangbajain merged into Damxung to form the modern Damxung County.

== Geography ==
The county has an area of 10,036 square kilometres (3,875 sq mi), with rugged topography. Damxung is long and narrow, measuring 185 kilometres (115 mi) from the northeast to southwest extremes, and at most 65 km across (40 mi). The county is tectonically active and was the epicenter of a 7.5M_{w} earthquake in the north in 1952 and a 6.4 M_{w} earthquake in the south in 2008. In November 2010 a moderate quake in Damxung at 5.2 on the Richter scale shook office windows in Lhasa. There were no casualties, but houses were damaged.

In the extreme northeast of the county, Namtso lake has an area of 1,920 square kilometres (740 sq mi), of which 45% lies in Damxung county. Namtso is one of the great lakes of the Tibetan plateau. The Nyenchen Tanglha (or Nyainqentanglha) mountains extend along the northwest of the county. Mount Nyenchen Tanglha is the highest peak in the region, at 7,111 metres (23,330 ft). The Nyainqêntanglha mountains define the watershed between northern and southern Tibet. A valley with elevation of about 4,200 metres (13,800 ft) runs parallel to the mountains to their southeast, sloping from northwest to southeast. 30% of the county's total area is in the prairie of this valley.

=== Climate ===
Damxung is cold and dry in the winter, cool and wet in summer, with very variable weather. The average annual temperature is 1.3 °C (34.3 °F), with only 62 frost-free days. The land is frozen from the start of November to the following March. Pasture has 90–120 days for growth. Average annual precipitation is 481 millimetres (18.9 in).

Climate data for Damxung County, elevation 4,200 m (13,800 ft), (1991–2020 normals, extremes 1981–present)
Month	Jan	Feb	Mar	Apr	May	Jun	Jul	Aug	Sep	Oct	Nov	Dec	Year
Record high °C (°F)	15.0 (59.0)	15.0 (59.0)	19.3 (66.7)	20.0 (68.0)	23.7 (74.7)	26.5 (79.7)	25.5 (77.9)	23.0 (73.4)	20.5 (68.9)	19.4 (66.9)	16.5 (61.7)	14.4 (57.9)	26.5 (79.7)
Mean daily maximum °C (°F)	1.3 (34.3)	3.4 (38.1)	6.6 (43.9)	10.0 (50.0)	14.1 (57.4)	17.7 (63.9)	17.9 (64.2)	17.3 (63.1)	15.5 (59.9)	11.5 (52.7)	6.4 (43.5)	2.9 (37.2)	10.4 (50.7)
Daily mean °C (°F)	−8.0 (17.6)	−5.2 (22.6)	−1.4 (29.5)	2.4 (36.3)	6.6 (43.9)	10.7 (51.3)	11.5 (52.7)	10.8 (51.4)	8.7 (47.7)	3.3 (37.9)	−3.0 (26.6)	−7.0 (19.4)	2.4 (36.4)
Mean daily minimum °C (°F)	−16.3 (2.7)	−13.4 (7.9)	−8.8 (16.2)	−4.3 (24.3)	0.2 (32.4)	5.0 (41.0)	6.6 (43.9)	6.1 (43.0)	3.9 (39.0)	−3.1 (26.4)	−10.2 (13.6)	−15.2 (4.6)	−4.1 (24.6)
Record low °C (°F)	−32.5 (−26.5)	−25.7 (−14.3)	−20.7 (−5.3)	−14.1 (6.6)	−8.8 (16.2)	−5.1 (22.8)	−1.4 (29.5)	−2.9 (26.8)	−5.1 (22.8)	−16.4 (2.5)	−26.6 (−15.9)	−32.0 (−25.6)	−32.5 (−26.5)
Average precipitation mm (inches)	2.9 (0.11)	2.8 (0.11)	6.7 (0.26)	13.3 (0.52)	35.2 (1.39)	88.8 (3.50)	124.4 (4.90)	116.5 (4.59)	73.9 (2.91)	17.1 (0.67)	4.4 (0.17)	2.1 (0.08)	488.1 (19.21)
Average precipitation days (≥ 0.1 mm)	2.9	2.7	4.5	7.6	12.4	18.7	21.1	20.9	17.7	7.3	2.5	1.9	120.2
Average snowy days	4.6	3.9	7.3	11.5	11.9	1.5	0.1	0.1	1.1	8.0	3.5	3.0	56.5
Average relative humidity (%)	43	39	40	47	54	61	68	70	70	57	50	46	54
Mean monthly sunshine hours	234.2	216.5	241.9	250.0	269.6	241.6	214.2	218.2	224.8	266.9	258.1	253.5	2,889.5
Percentage possible sunshine	72	68	65	64	63	57	50	54	62	77	82	80	66
Source: China Meteorological Administrationall-time Jul high

== Administration ==
Damxung County is divided into two towns and six townships. The seat of government is in Dangquka.

Name	Tibetan	Tibetan Pinyin	Chinese	Pinyin
Towns
Damquka Town	འདམ་ཆུ་ཁ་གྲོང་རྡལ།	'dam chu kha grong rdal	当曲卡镇	Dāngqǔkǎ Zhèn
Yangbajain Town	ཡངས་པ་ཅན་གྲོང་རྡལ།	yangs pa can grong rdal	羊八井镇	Yángbājǐng Zhèn
Townships
Gyaidar Township	རྒྱས་དར་ཤང་།	rgyas dar shang	格达乡	Gédá Xiāng
Nyingzhung Township	སྙིང་དྲུང་ཤང་།	snying drung shang	宁中乡	Níngzhōng Xiāng
Gongtang Township	ཀོང་ཐང་ཤང་།	kong thang shang	公塘乡	Gōngtáng Xiāng
Lungring Township	ལུང་རིང་ཤང་།	lung ring shang	龙仁乡	Lóngrén Xiāng
Uma Township	དབུ་མ་ཐང་ཤང་།	dbu ma thang shang	乌玛塘乡	Wūmǎtáng Xiāng
Namco Township	གནམ་མཚོ་ཤང་།	gnam mtsho shang	纳木错乡	Nàmùcuò Xiāng

== Population and economy ==
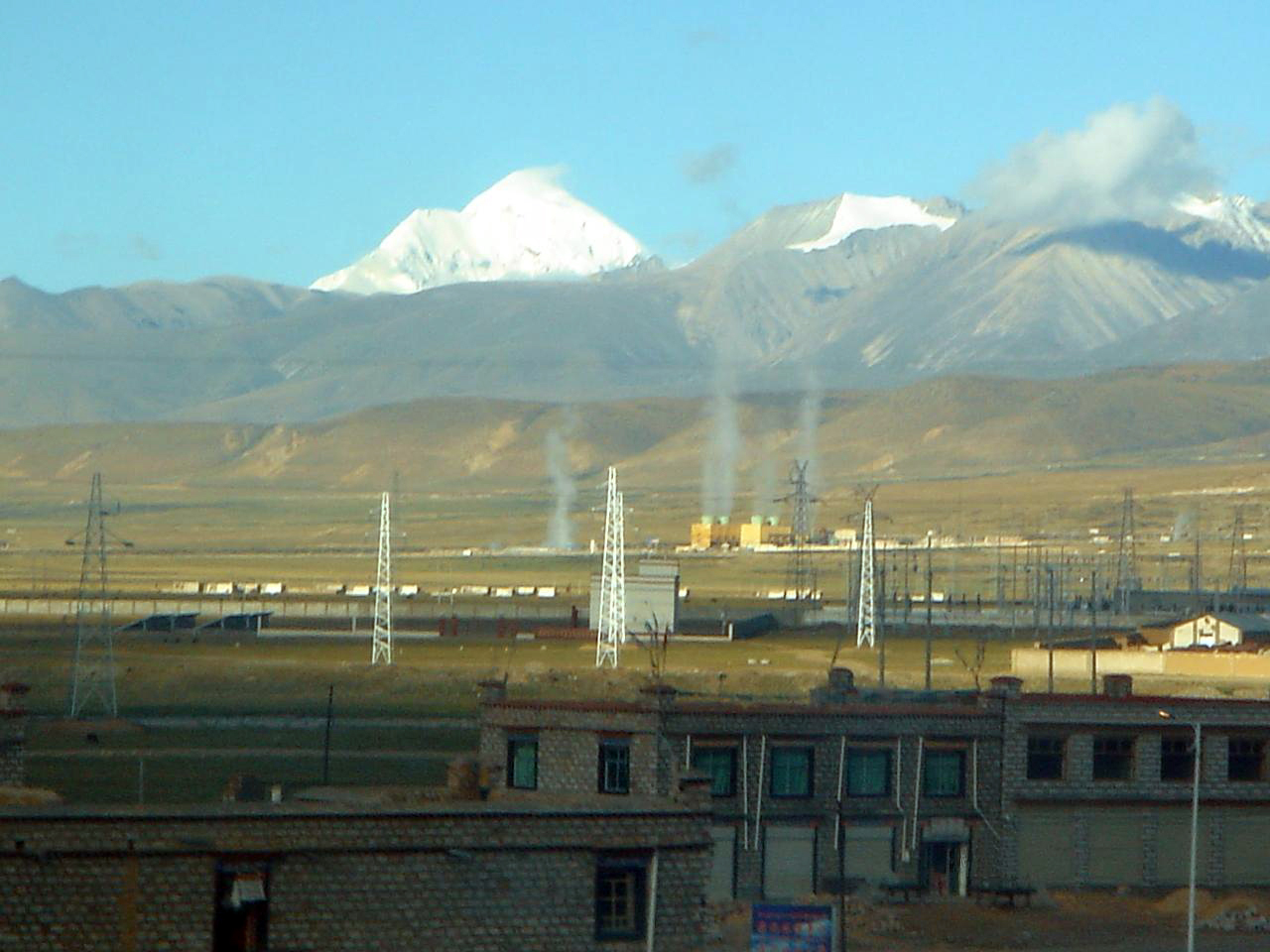
Yangbajain geothermal power station

As of 2013 the population was 40,000, up from 35,000 in 1997. In 2000 Damxung had a total population of 39,169, of which 19,429 were male and 18,740 were female. Almost all were ethnic Tibetans. The rural population was 36,607 and the urban population 2,562. As of 2009 there were 37 primary and secondary school buildings. There were seven hospitals, including a county hospital, with a total of 40 beds and 161 medical personnel.

Natural grasslands cover 693,171 hectares (1,712,860 acres), of which 68% is considered excellent. Almost all the people are engaged in rearing livestock, including yaks, sheep, goats and horses. In 1999 the herds other than horses included 224,600 sheep (42.55%), 179,600 yak (34.02%), 116,900 goats (22.14%).

The Qinghai-Tibet Highway (China National Highway 109) runs from east to west across the county. Damxung railway station links the county to the city of Lhasa to the south. There is a large geothermal field at Yangbajain. This is harnessed by generating units that deliver 25,180 kW, or 100 million kilowatt hours annually, to the city of Lhasa to the south. The transmission line follows the Duilong River south through Doilungdêqên District. Yangbajain Geothermal Field is currently the largest proven geothermal field of its nature in China. There is a gypsum mine with reserves of 100 million tons in Uma township. Other mineral resources include aluminum, tin, lead, zinc and copper.

== Monuments ==
Kangmar Monastery (康玛寺) is in Chonggar Village, Gungtang Township, Damxung County, 16 kilometres (10 mi) from the county seat. The monastery belonged to the Gelug sect, and was administered by the Hardongkangcun of the Tantric School of Sera Monastery. As of 2003 it had 62 monks and was the largest monastery in Damxung. It was said to have been built by a monk from Kangma in Garze Prefecture. The meditation room has 1,213 carved stone reliefs of Buddha, mostly about 20 by 30 centimetres (8 by 12 in). They are about three hundred years old. The temple stands on a barren slope below a mountain, but the meeting room has electric light and heating. The temple operates a tea house and a grocery store. The monks have built a two-story dormitory.

Yangpachen Monastery is a Tibetan Buddhist monastery in Yangbajain, historically the seat of the Shamarpas of Karma Kagyu. It is the main monastery of the Red Hat school of the Karma Kagyu sect. It was built in 1490, and through extensive repairs and additions grew into a major architectural complex that contained a large collection of cultural relics. The Red Hat school of Karma Kagyu died out in 1791. The monastery was destroyed during the Cultural Revolution, but later was rebuilt.

The Eight Towers of Northern Tibet (藏北八塔) in Wumatang (Uma) townland are said to be the guardians of the grasslands of northern Tibet. One story of their origin is that eight generals of King Gesar, who unified the grasslands of northern Tibet, were killed at this place and the towers were built to commemorate them. Another says that the eight generals of the Mongol army were killed here. This may be more plausible, since the names seem to have Mongol origins.

Namtso lake is the second-largest salt lake in China. It has vivid turquoise-blue waters and is set in spectacular scenery. The Tashi Dor Monastery is at an elevation of 4,718 metres (15,479 ft) in the southeastern corner of the lake. It is situated on the Tashi Dor promontory. It is more a chapel than a monastery, with two small buildings holding images of local deities.

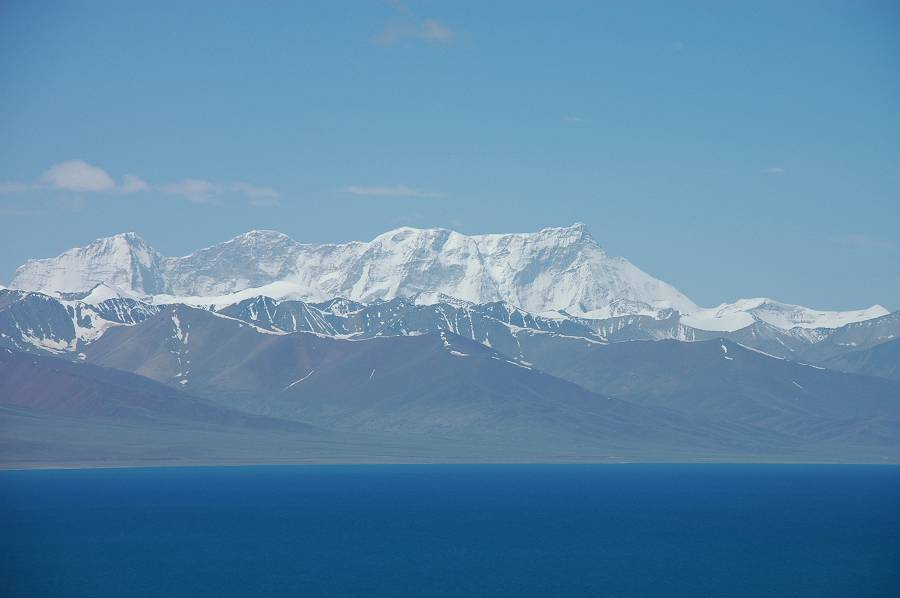
Nyainqentanglha rising above Namtso

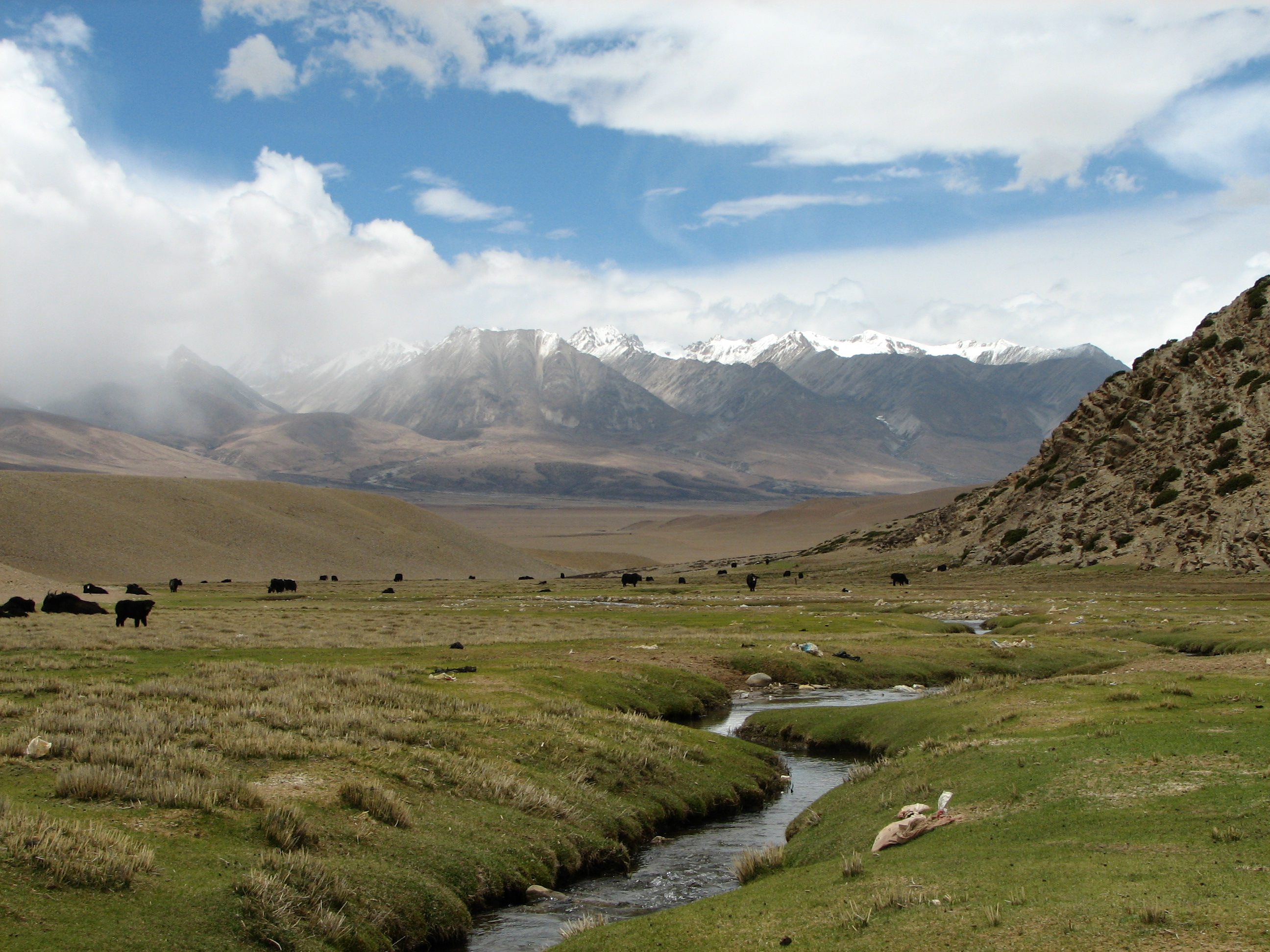
Yangpachen valley

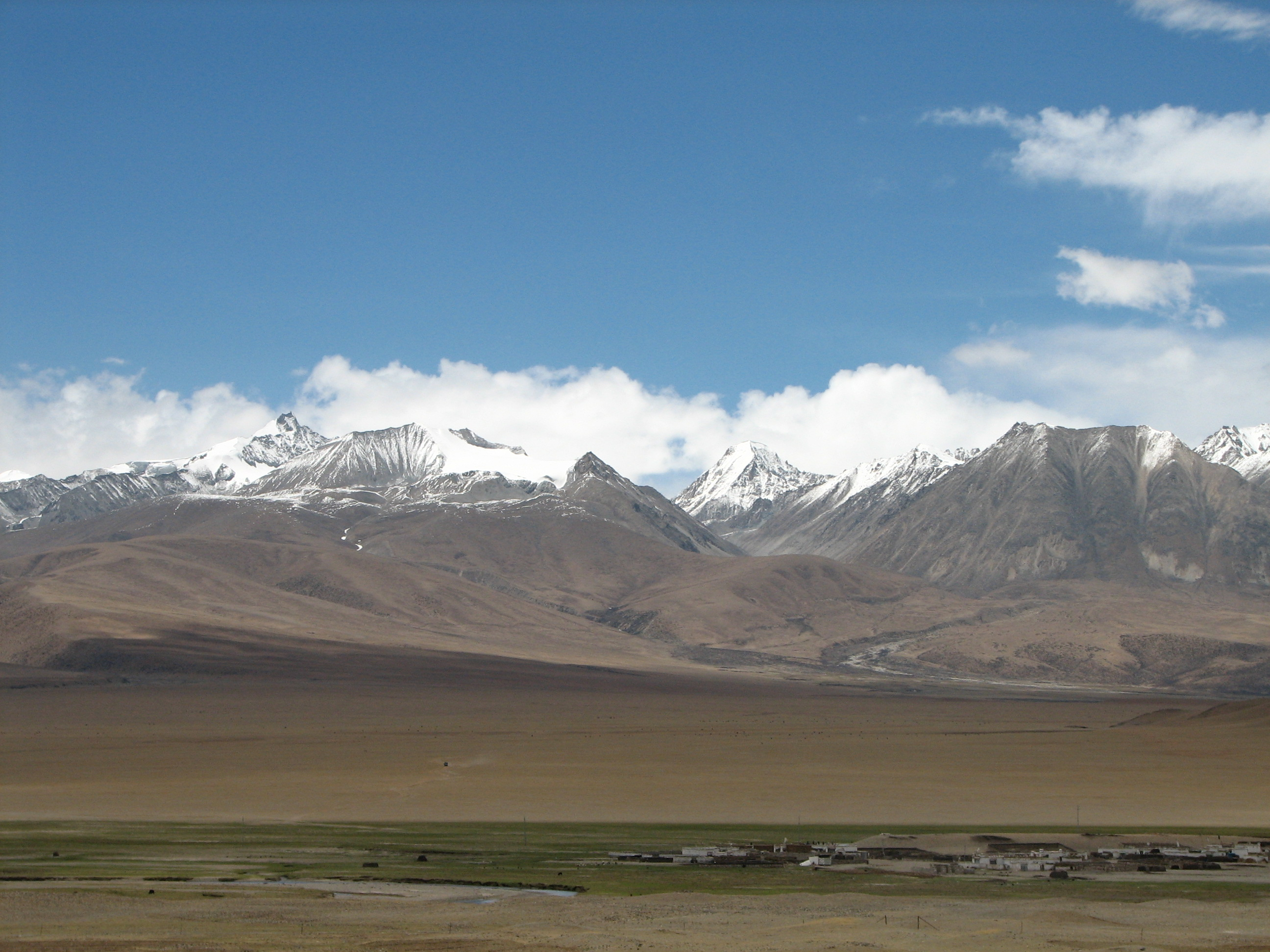
View to the north of Gyaidar

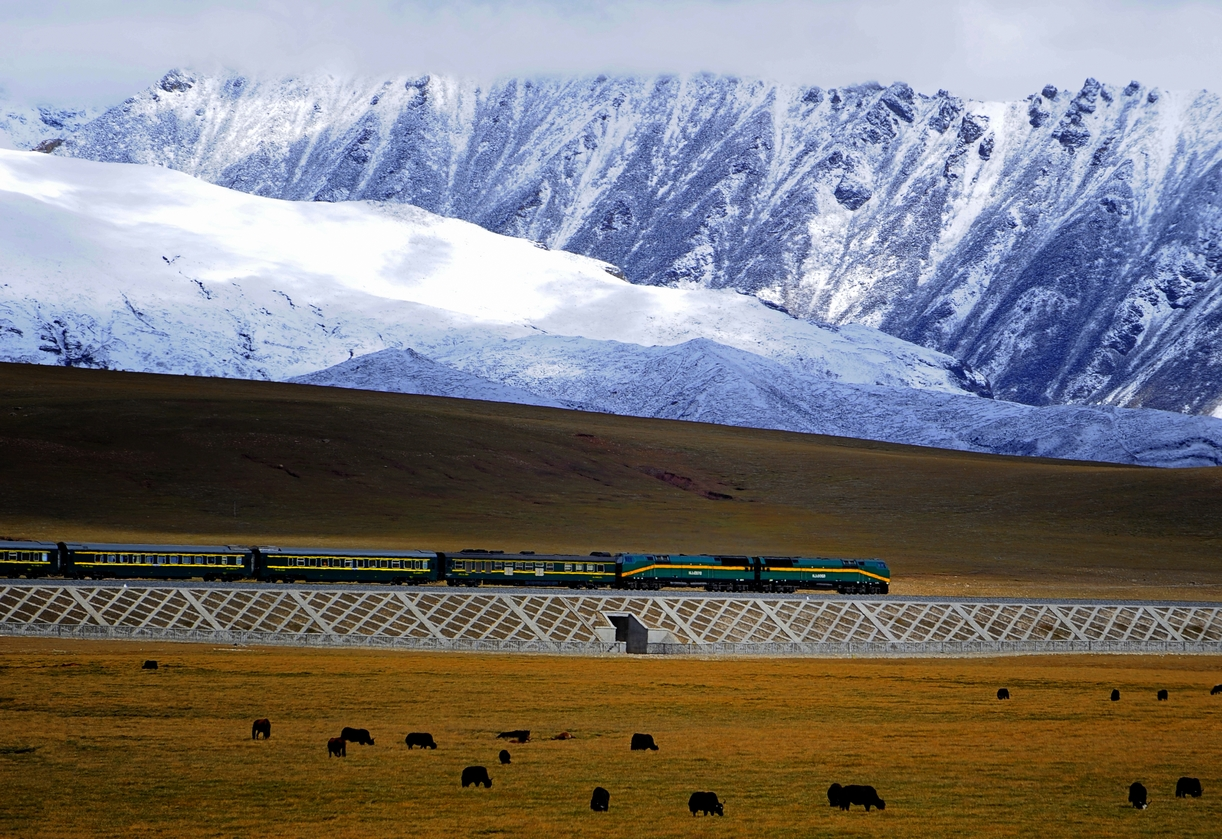
Railway about 20 kilometres (12 mi) north of Yangbajain

== Sources ==
- Chow, Chung Wah; Eimer, David; Heller, Carolyn B.; Huhti, Thomas (2009). China. Lonely Planet. ISBN 978-1-74220-325-6.
- "Damxung Land Resources" (in Chinese). Land and Resources Information Center of Tibet Autonomous Region. 2010-08-15. Archived from the original on 2015-02-08.
- "Damxung Mineral Resources" (in Chinese). Land and Resources Information Center of Tibet Autonomous Region. Archived from the original on 20 August 2010.
- Wang Yi Lin (2008-10-07). "Damxung Tibet Introduction" (in Chinese). CCTV.
- Dowman, Keith (1988). The Power-places of Central Tibet: The Pilgrim's Guide. London: Routledge & Kegan Paul. ISBN 0-7102-1370-0.
- Lobsang, Zhaxi; Zhang, Junyi (2003). "Ancient Stone Relief of Kangma". China Tibet Information Center. Archived from the original on 2015-02-08.
- Mei, Zhimin (2008-10-06). "Lhasa, Tibet Damxung – 6.6 Earthquake" (in Chinese). China News Network.
- "Moderate quake jolts Tibet; no injuries reported". Hindustan Times. 2010-12-01. Archived from the original on February 16, 2015.
- "Tashi Dor Monastery". Wind Horse Tours. Archived from the original on 2015-02-08.
- "Yangpachen Monastery". Meiya Travel. Archived from the original on 2015-02-11.
- Yangzheng, Lin Duanminpeicong (2011-08-17). "Eight Towers of Northern Tibet". China Tibet Network. Archived from the original on 2016-03-03.
- Zhang, Ming-tao; Tong, Wei (1982). "The Hydrothermal Activities and Exploitation Potentiality of Geothermal Energy in Southern Xizang (Tibet)". Energy, Resources and Environment: Papers Presented at the First U.S.-China Conference on Energy, Resources and Environment, 7-12 November 1982, Beijing, China. Elsevier Science. ISBN 978-1-4831-3583-0.
