= Coastline of China =

National coastline in East Asia

Map of China's Eastern coastline

China's coastline covers approximately 14,500 km (around 9,010 mi) from the Bohai gulf in the north to the Gulf of Tonkin in the south. Most of the northern half is low lying, although some of the mountains and hills of Northeast China and the Shandong Peninsula extend to the coast. The southern half is more irregular. In Zhejiang and Fujian provinces, for example, much of the coast is rocky and steep. South of this area the coast becomes less rugged: Low mountains and hills extend more gradually to the coast, and small river deltas are common. The southern coast on the South China Sea is also low, with sweeping hills and plains.

China's coasts are on the Yellow Sea, East China Sea and South China Sea. China claims a 12-nautical-mile territorial sea, a 24-nautical-mile contiguous zone, a 200-nautical-mile exclusive economic zone, and a 200-nautical-mile continental shelf or the distance to the edge of the continental shelf.

== Natural history ==
The shape and features of the Chinese coast have been influenced dramatically by geology, climate, natural storms, tides, currents, sea level changes, winds, and tectonics. Inland rivers such as the Yangtze and Huang He also supply the coast with sediment, which influence and control erosional trends. These factors have created a diverse array of ecosystems and landforms. During the prehistoric era, tectonic activity associated with the Eurasian, Pacific, Yangtze, and Philippine Plates played a pivotal role in sculpting its coastlines, forming prominent features like the Bohai Bay, Yellow Sea, and South China Sea.

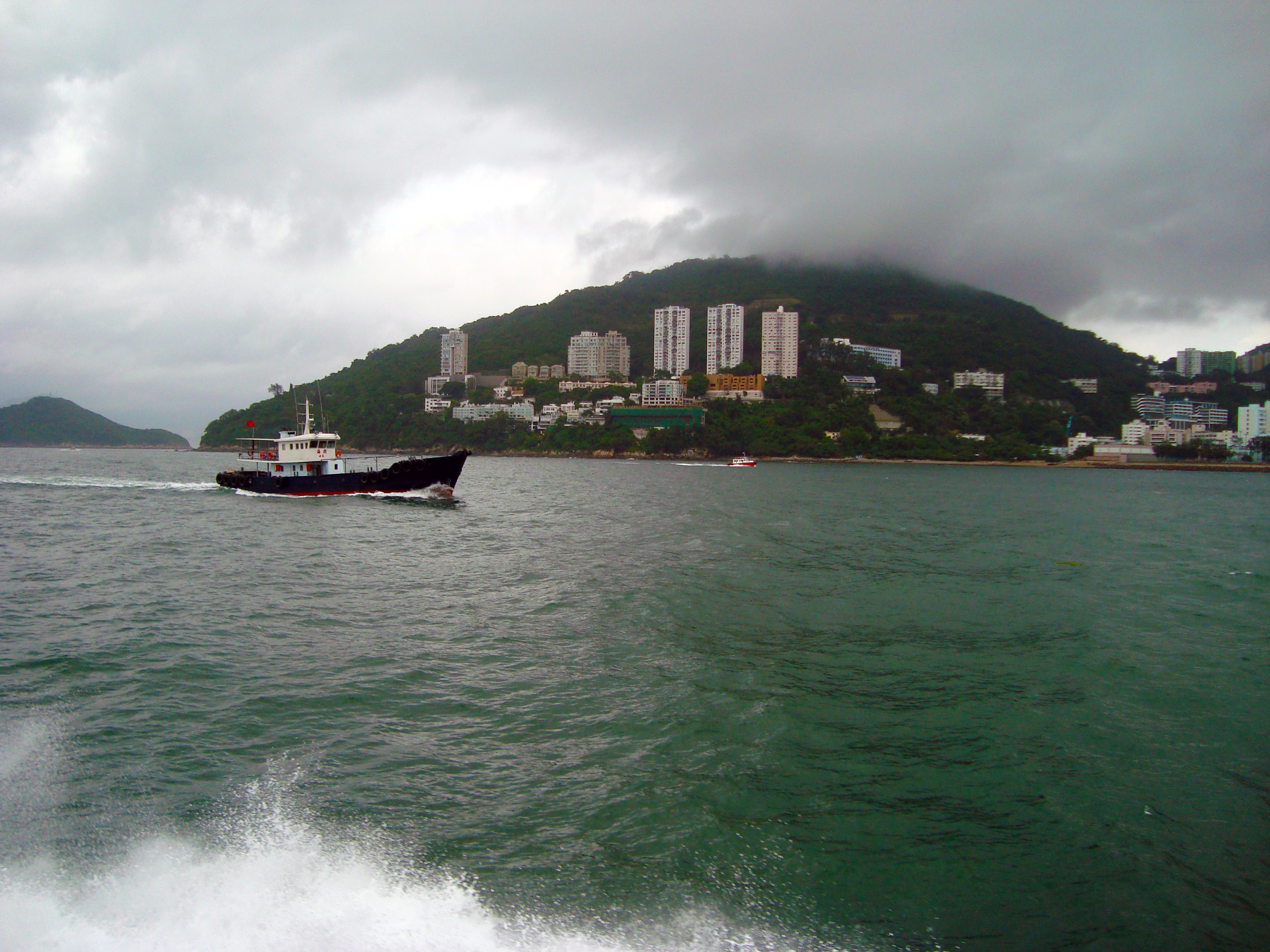
Hong Kong's coast

The Ice Ages significantly influenced the coastline's modern configuration, fluctuating sea levels due to glaciation. Interglacial periods exposed vast continental shelves, such as those in the South China Sea, which were once land bridges supporting diverse prehistoric flora, fauna, and early human migrations. These changes also contributed to the formation of sediment-rich deltas, including the Yangtze and Pearl River deltas.

Prehistoric volcanic activity also played a significant role, particularly during the Mesozoic and Cenozoic eras, creating islands, altering coastal topography, and depositing rich sedimented soils.

It is theorized that small asteroid impacts, such as the one thought to have occurred in the Bohai Sea region during prehistoric times, may have caused localized reshaping of coastal areas and contributed to mass extinctions that reshuffled marine and terrestrial ecosystems.

Today, these regions exhibit a blend of rocky cliffs, sandy beaches, mudflats, and extensive mangrove forests, all within tropical and temperate climates.

== Anthropology ==
Human activity in China's coastal regions is known to have begun in the Neolithic period, where small populations were drawn to these areas for their abundant natural resources. Coastal plains and river deltas like those of the Yangtze and Yellow Rivers offered fertile soil for early agriculture, while access to marine life supported fishing-based communities. Archaeological evidence from sites such as Hemudu, Yangshao, and Longshan, near the Yangtze River Delta, reveals that these coastal societies were among the first in the world to cultivate rice and develop advanced pottery, establishing the region as a cradle of early East Asian civilisation. Studies show that the ancestors of Austronesians originate from the coastlines of southeastern China although others state that they originate from northeast China. Populations from northeast China also contributed to the genetic makeup of post-Yayoi Japanese populations.

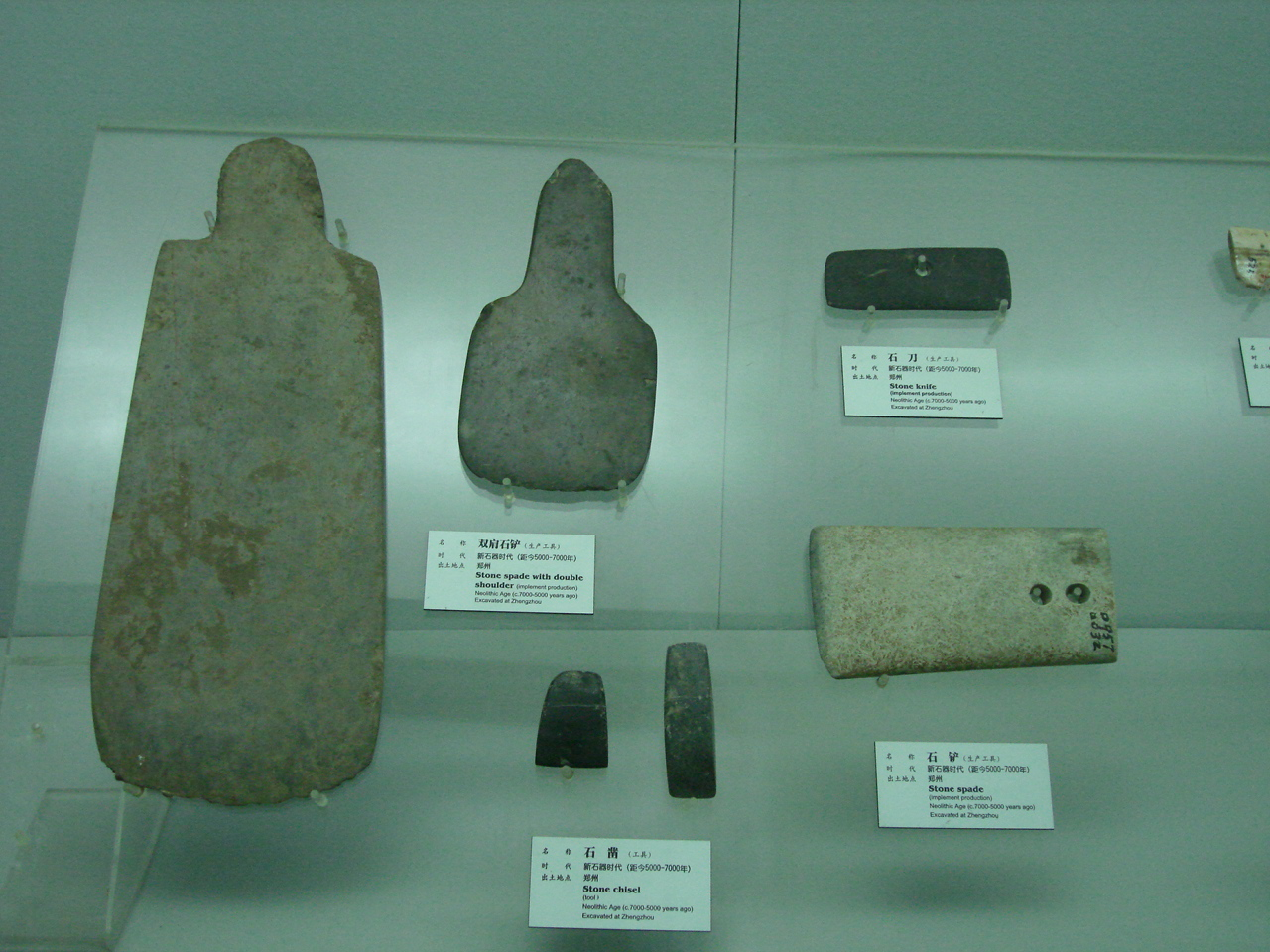
Spades recovered from the early Yangshao civilization on the Yangtze River

During the Bronze Age, China's coastal areas became hubs of trade and commerce. By the Shang and Zhou dynasties (1600–256 BCE), the use of maritime routes allowed for the exchange of goods and technology fostering the growth of early coastal cities. The development of shipbuilding technology and navigation during this time allowed for the expansion of trade networks, particularly in the South China Sea, where early maritime Silk Road routes began to emerge. The coastline was a link between inland agricultural societies and external trading, including Southeast Asia and India.

The Chinese imperial period saw coastal regions take on an even more prominent role in China's economic and geopolitical landscape. Cities such as Guangzhou and Quanzhou became large ports, central to the trade of silk, tea, ceramics, and other goods. The Song dynasty (960–1279) marked a peak in maritime activity, with advancements in ship design and navigation, spurring the rise of ocean-going commerce. These regions also became entry points for cultural and technological exchange, including the introduction of Buddhism from India and the spread of Chinese cultural practices to neighboring countries.

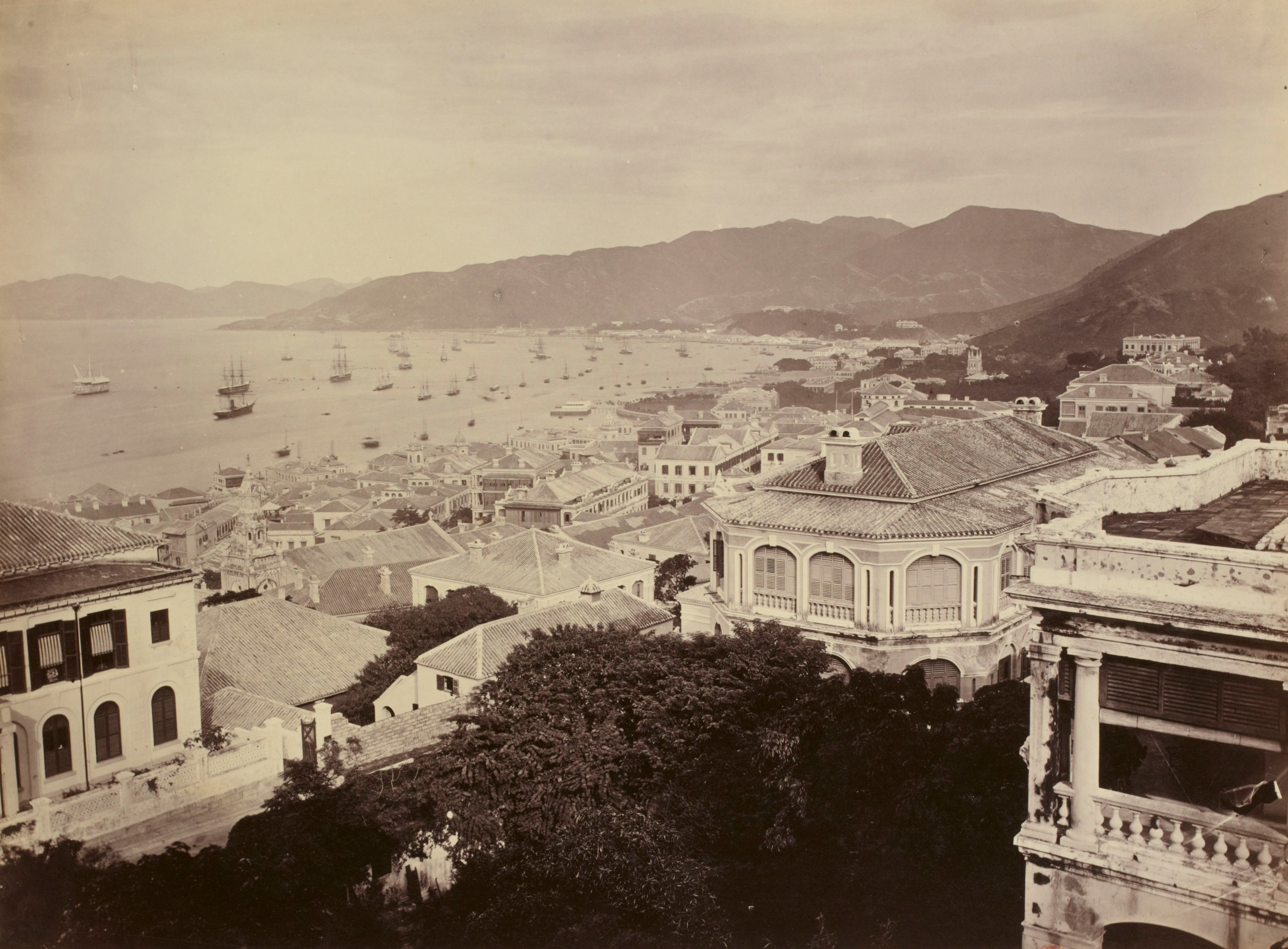
A 1868 photograph of the port of Hong Kong

The arrival of European colonial powers in the 19th century significantly shifted the nature of commerce on China's coasts. Shanghai and Hong Kong, treaty ports established during the Opium Wars, became epicenters of international trade, but also cultural symbols of foreign domination and economic exploitation. These population centers set the stage for the rapid industrialization of the coastal region. By the 20th century, cities along the coastline had transformed into hubs of manufacturing, finance, and innovation, driving China's economic ascent.

Today, China's coastal regions are among the most densely populated and economically vital areas in the world. Urban centers like Shenzhen, Shanghai, and Tianjin benefit from their strategic locations along key shipping routes.

== Seas ==
- Yellow Sea
- East China Sea
- South China Sea

== Straits ==
- Bohai Strait (渤海海峡)
- Taiwan Strait
- Qiongzhou Strait

== Islands ==
- Islands of China

== Bays ==
- Bohai Bay
- Bohai Sea
- Dalian Bay
- Daya Bay
- Haitang Bay
- Hangzhou Bay
- Hong Kong bays
- Jiaozhou Bay
- Korea Bay
- Laizhou Bay
- Liaodong Bay
- Sanya Bay
- Yalong Bay
- Yellow River Delta and Bohai Sea

== Peninsulas ==
- Dapeng Peninsula
- Leizhou Peninsula
- Liaodong Peninsula
- Macau Peninsula
- Shandong Peninsula
- Tashi Dor

== Population Centers ==
- Liaoning
  - Dalian
  - Dandong
  - Jinzhou
- Hebei
  - Qinhuangdao
- Tianjin
  - Tianjin
- Shandong
  - Yantai
  - Qingdao
- Shanghai
  - Shanghai
- Zhejiang
  - Hangzhou
  - Ningbo
  - Wenzhou
- Fujian
  - Fuzhou
  - Putian
  - Xiamen
- Guangdong
  - Chaozhou
- Hong Kong
  - Hong Kong
- Macau
  - Macau
- Guangxi
  - Zhangjiang
  - Beihai
  - Qinzhou
- Hainan
  - Haikou
  - Wenchang
  - Qionghai
  - Wanning
  - Dongfang

== Ports ==
- Ports of China

== Pollution ==
A total of 145,000 square kilometers of shallow waters along China's vast coast failed to meet national quality standards for clean oceanic water, of which 29,000 square kilometers of seawater were seriously polluted. These severely polluted water areas included East Liaoning, Bohai and Hangzhou bays, and the estuaries of Yellow, Yangtze and Zhujiang rivers, as well as inshore areas of major coastal cities. Content of major pollutants, such as inorganic nitrogen and phosphate, remains high in contaminated seawater. During the past 50 years, the inshore ecosystem had seen 50 percent of coastal wetlands disappear in excessive reclamation and 80 percent of coral reefs and mangroves destroyed.

== See also ==
- List of countries by length of coastline
- Geography of the People's Republic of China
- List of national parks of the People's Republic of China
- Protected areas of the People's Republic of China
- List of UNESCO Biosphere Reserves in China
- Early Chinese cartography

== Notes ==
1. https://www.frontiersin.org/journals/earth-science/articles/10.3389/feart.2022.1076801/full.
2. .https://www.nsfc.gov.cn/csc/20345/24371/pdf/2009/Coastal%20erosion%20in%20China%20under%20the%20condition%20of%20global%20climate%20change%20and%20measures%20for%20its%20prevention.pdf
3. https://web.archive.org/web/20110711084531/http://www.geo-earth.com/forums/index.php?act=Attach&type=post&id=20698
4. https://link.springer.com/article/10.1023/B:MATG.0000029299.02919.f8
5. https://web.archive.org/web/20090706055219/http://www.coast.org.cn/
6. https://seagrant.whoi.edu/wp-content/uploads/2015/01/WHOI-R-87-011-Ying-Wang-and-David-Au.pdf
7. https://heritagesciencejournal.springeropen.com/articles/10.1186/s40494-024-01286-2
8. https://china-underground.com/2024/02/04/prehistoric-china-from-neolithic-cultures-to-the-dawn-of-dynasties/
9. https://www.frontiersin.org/journals/earth-science/articles/10.3389/feart.2021.654416/full
10. https://www.frontiersin.org/journals/earth-science/articles/10.3389/feart.2020.609912/full
