= Laken (disambiguation) =

Laken is the Dutch spelling of Laeken, a suburb of Brussels.

Laken may also refer to:

- Laken La, a mountain pass in Tibet
- Thomas Laken (born 1972), Vanuatuan politician
- William Laken (died 1475), English serjeant-at-law and judge
- Laken Lockridge, a character on the American soap opera Santa Barbara
- Laken Riley (2002–2024), American nursing student and murder victim
