= List of islands by name (Z) =

This article features a list of islands sorted by their name beginning with the letter Z.

== Z ==
| Island's Name | Island group(s) | Country/Countries |
|---|---|---|
| Zakynthos | Ionian Islands | Greece |
| Zamamijima | Kerama Islands part of the Okinawa Islands part of the Ryukyu Islands | Japan |
| Ile Zanguille | | Seychelles |
| Zanzibar | | Tanzania |
| Zavé | | Seychelles |
| Zealand | | Denmark |
| Zembra | | Tunisia |
| Zha Xi | Lake Basum Tso, Tibet | China |
| Zhenbao | Ussuri River | China |
| Zhifu | Bohai Sea | China |
| Zhokova | De Long Islands | Russia |
| Zhongshan Dao | Pearl River Delta, Macau | China |
| Zhoushan | Zhoushan Archipelago | China |
| Zhujiajian | Zhoushan Archipelago | China |
| Zlarin | | Croatia |
| Zug | River Rouge, Michigan | United States |
| Zuid-Beveland | Zeeland | Netherlands |
| Żuławy | Islands of Gdańsk Bay | Poland |
| Zuqar | Red Sea | Disputed between Eritrea and Yemen |

== See also ==
- List of islands (by country)
- List of islands by area
- List of islands by population
- List of islands by highest point
