= Gyaidar Township =

Gyaidar
- Township

Tibetan transcription(s)
  - Tibetan: རྒྱས་དར།།
  - Wylie transliteration: rgyas dar

Chinese transcription(s)
  - Traditional: 格达乡
  - Pinyin: Gédá Xiāng
- Location within Tibet
- Coordinates: 30°31′04″N 90°45′46″E
- Country: China
- Province: Tibet Autonomous Region
- Prefecture: Lhasa Prefecture
- County: Damxung County
- Time zone: UTC+8 (CST)

Gyaidar (Chinese: 格达乡; pinyin: Gédá Xiāng) is a town and township in Damxung County in the Lhasa Prefecture of Tibet, China. The township was affected by the February 5th Damxung earthquake in February 2009. Herdsmen of 151 households in Yangyi village, in Gyaidar Township had to evacuate their homes.
