= Wumatang Township =

Wumatang Uma
- Township
- དབུ་མ་ཐང་

Tibetan transcription(s)
  - Tibetan: དབུ་མ་ཐང་
  - Wylie transliteration: dbu ma thang

Chinese transcription(s)
  - Traditional: 乌玛塘乡
  - Pinyin: Wūmǎtáng Xiāng
- Location within Tibet
- Coordinates: 30.56°N 91.4032°E
- Country: China
- Province: Tibet Autonomous Region
- Prefecture: Lhasa Prefecture
- County: Damxung County
- Time zone: UTC+8 (CST)

Wumatang (དབུ་མ་ཐང།) is a small town and township-level division in Damxung County in the Lhasa Prefecture of the Tibet Autonomous Region of China. It is served by Wumatang railway station.

== See also ==
- List of towns and villages in Tibet
