= Yangbajing Solar Park =

Photovoltaic power station in Tibet, China

- Official name: 羊八井光伏电站
- Country: China
- Location: Yangbajain, Tibet
- Coordinates: 30.10607°N 90.50106°E
- Status: Operational
- Commission date: 10 May 2012
- Construction cost: CNY 450 million

Solar farm
- Type: Flat-panel PV

Power generation
- Nameplate capacity: 30 MW
- Annual net output: 55 GWh

The Yangbajing Solar Park is a 30 MWp photovoltaic power station located in Yangbajain, Tibet.

== See also ==
- List of photovoltaic power stations
- Photovoltaic power station
- Photovoltaics
