= Yangbajain =

Tibetan transcription(s)
  - Tibetan: ཡངས་པ་ཅན།
  - Wylie transliteration: yangs pa can
  - pronunciation in IPA: [jaŋpatɕɛ̃]
  - official transcription (PRC): Yangbajain
  - THDL: Yangpachen
  - other transcriptions: Yangpachän

Chinese transcription(s)
  - Traditional/Simplified: 羊八井
  - Pinyin: Yángbājǐng
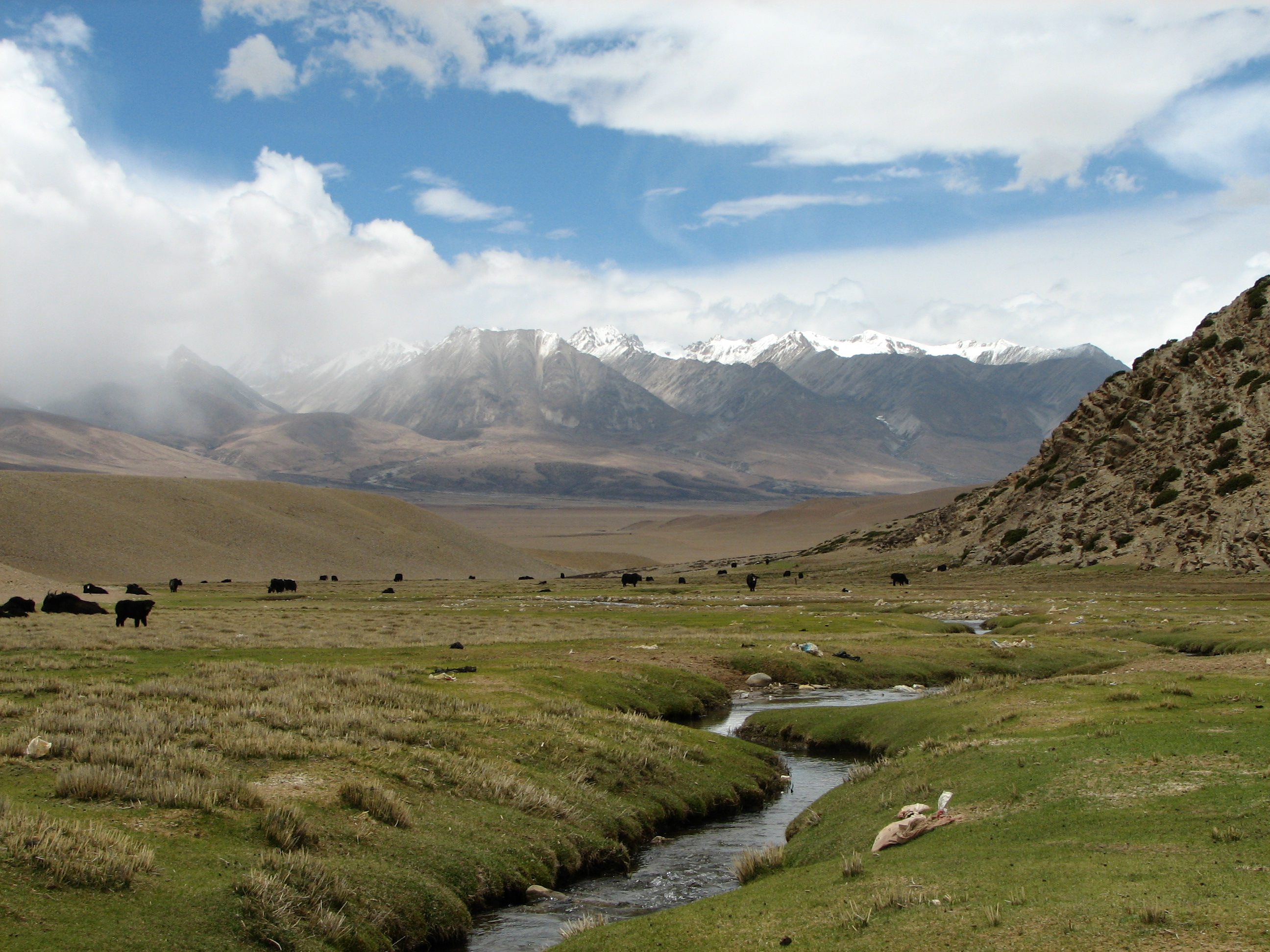
- Yangpachen Valley

- Location within Tibet Autonomous Region
- Coordinates: 30°5′N 90°33′E
- Country: China
- Region: Tibet Autonomous Region
- Prefecture: Lhasa
- County: Damxung County

Population
  - Major Nationalities: Tibetan
  - Regional dialect: Tibetan language
- Time zone: +8

Yangbajain (also spelled Yangbajing; Chinese: 羊八井; pinyin: Yángbājǐng) is a town approximately 87 kilometers (54 mi) north-west of Lhasa, halfway to Damxung in the Tibet Autonomous Region of China. The town lies just south of the Nyainqêntanglha Mountains, in an upland lush green valley surrounded by the tents of nomads with grazing yak and sheep populating the hillside. It is the site Yangpachen Monastery, which was historically the seat of the Shamarpas of Karma Kagyü and the Yangbajing International Cosmic Ray Observatory.

== Geothermal field ==
The area is famous for the Yangbajain Geothermal Field, which has been harnessed to produce electricity for the capital Lhasa. There is a thermoelectric power plant on the edge of the Yangbajain field covering 20–30 square kilometers. The power plant was established in 1977, and was the first development of geothermal power not only in Tibet but in the whole of China.

The Yangbajain hot springs field is at an elevation of 4,290 to 4,500 metres (14,070 to 14,760 ft) which makes it the highest elevation set of hot springs in China, and possibly the world. The highest temperature inside the drilling hole is 125.5 °C.

== Holy Medical Spring Resort ==
The Holy Medical Spring Resort has both two indoor swimming pools and one outdoor swimming pool, all filled with hot springs water. Bathing is allowed at an elevation of 4200 m AMSL, likely making it the highest swimming pool in the world.

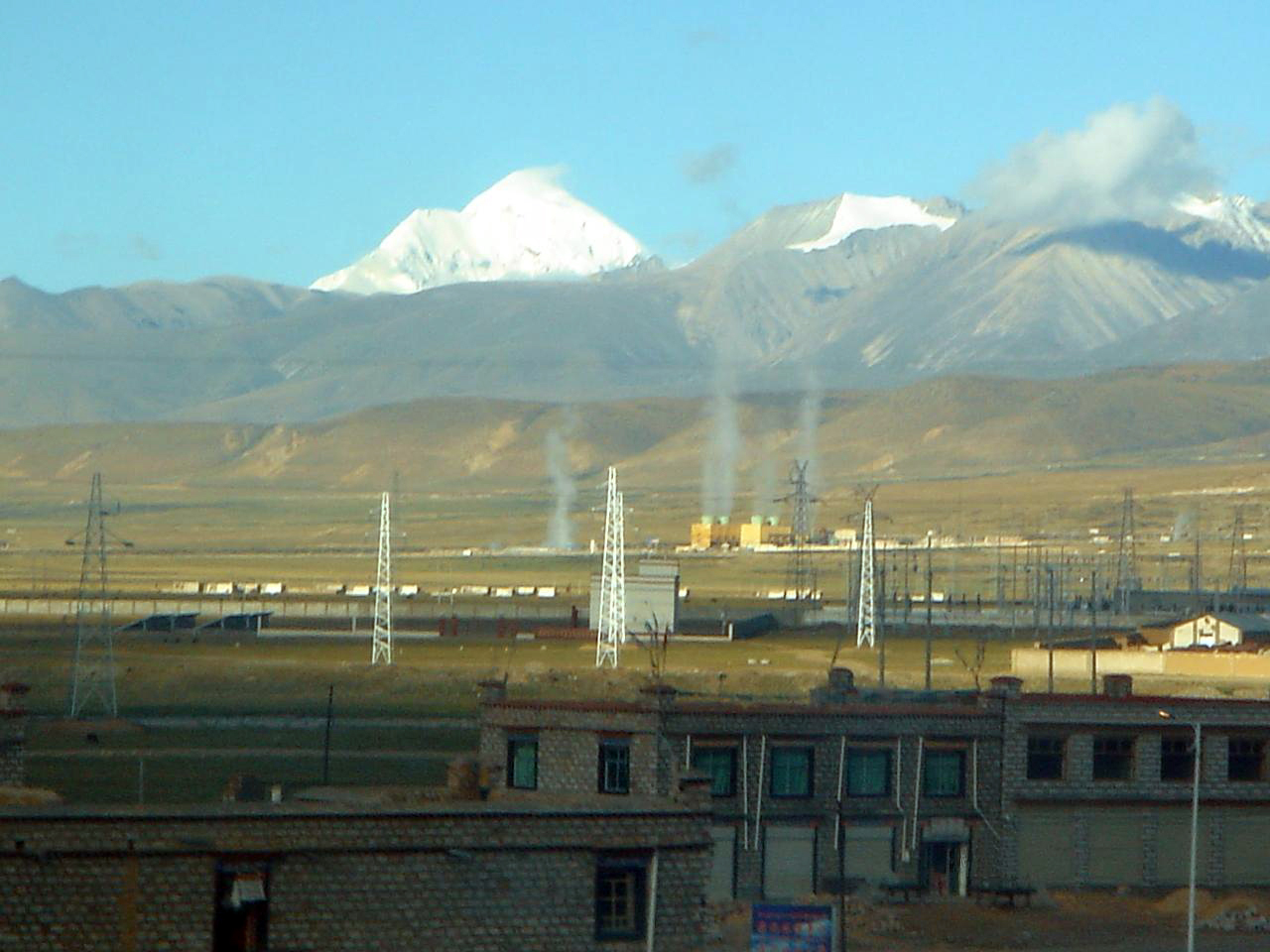
geothermal power station in Yangbajain

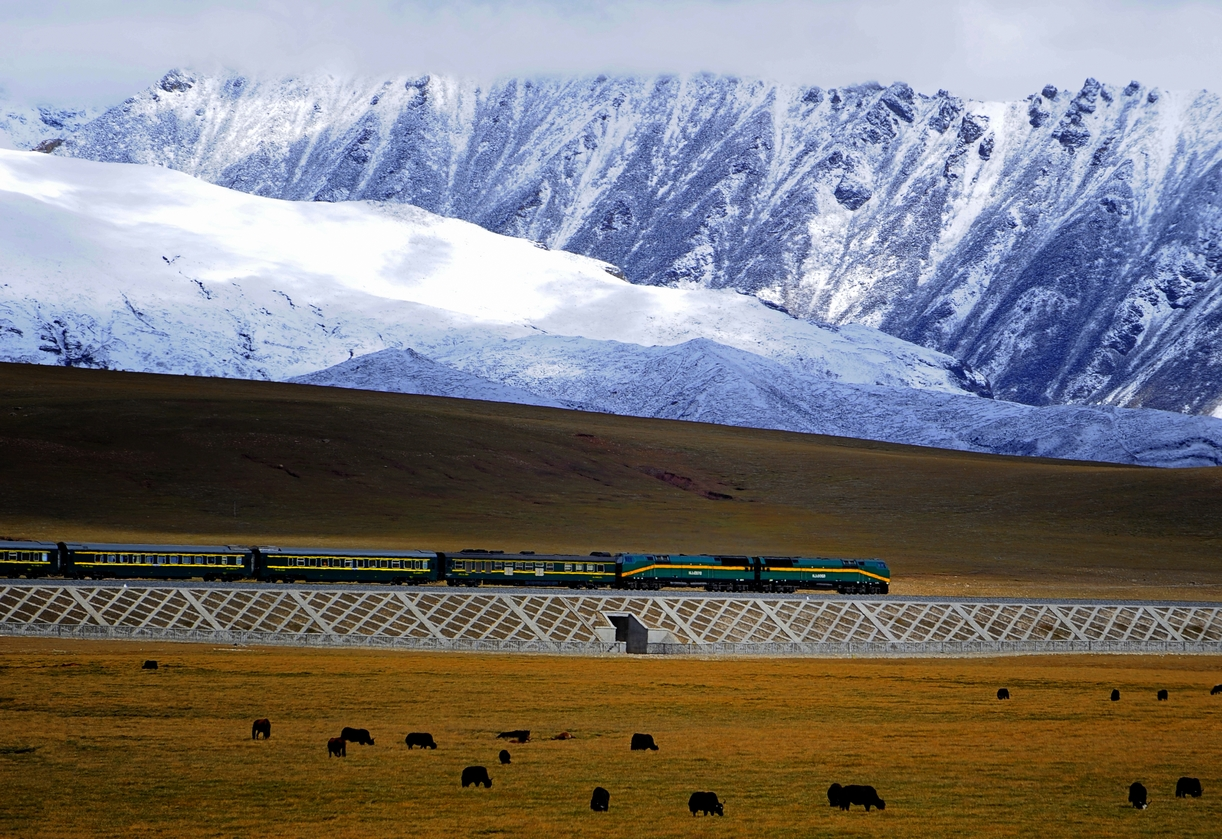
Railway about 20 kilometres north of the town

== Yangbajing International Cosmic Ray Observatory ==
The YBJ International Cosmic Ray Observatory (羊八井国际宇宙线观测站) is located in the Yangbajing valley of the Tibetan highland, a site chosen for its high elevation at 4300 meters above sea level. Collaborating institutes includes the INFN (Istituto Nazionale di Fisica Nucleare) and various Chinese and Japanese universities. The KOSMA 3-m submillimeter telescope has been relocated to a nearby site and renamed CCOSMA.

== See also ==
- List of astronomical observatories
- List of towns in Tibet by elevation
- Yangbajing Solar Park
