= Dangquka =

Dangquka, 当曲卡 འདམ་ཆུ་ཁ། Damxung
- Town

Tibetan transcription(s)

Chinese transcription(s)
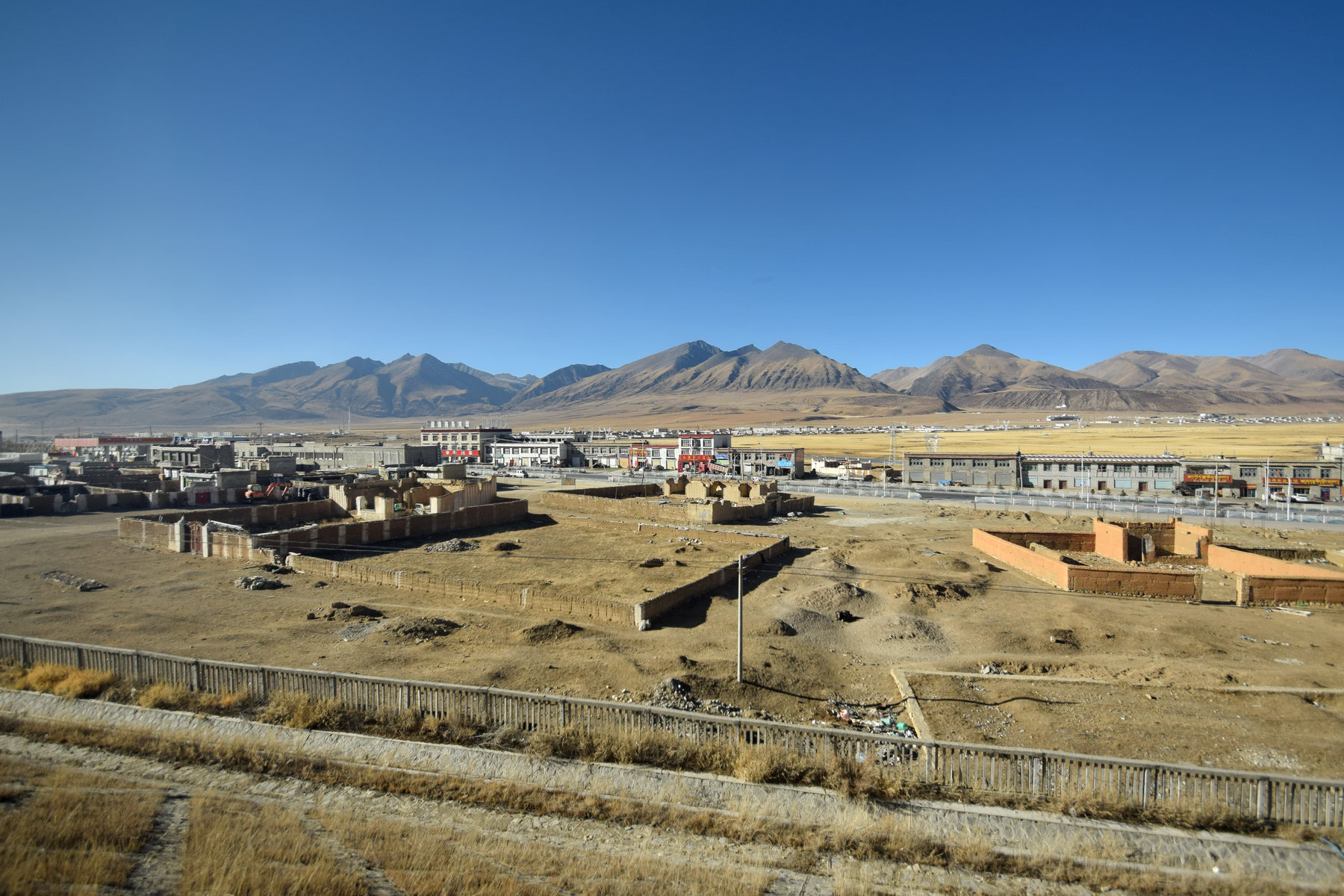
- Cityscape

- Location in Tibet Autonomous Region
- Coordinates: 30°28′39″N 91°06′10″E
- Country: People's Republic of China
- Province: Tibet Autonomous Region
- Prefecture-level city: Lhasa
- County: Damxung
- Village-level divisions: 2 residential communities
- Elevation: 4,288 m (14,068 ft)
- Time zone: UTC+8 (CST)
- Postal code: 851500
- Area code: 0891

Dangquka, or Damquka (simplified Chinese: 当曲卡; traditional Chinese: 當曲卡; pinyin: Dāngqǔkǎ; Standard Tibetan: འདམ་ཆུ་ཁ།) is a small modern Tibetan town of low-barrack like buildings and is the administrative centre of Damxung County, roughly two and a half hours by road northeast of Lhasa, the capital of the Tibet Autonomous Region. The main road in and out of the town is China National Highway 109. As of 2011, it has 2 residential communities (社区) under its administration.

== Economy ==
Unlike many of the quaint old Tibetan settlements in the more southern farming areas of Tibet this town is modern, built up during the 1960s by the Chinese. Damxung is an important spot in the region for government functions and general supplies. It has a large warehouse set back from the main street where basic necessities and warm clothes can be bought for trekking through the mountains. Its nearest towns are Yangpachen to the south and Nagqu to the north.

A major Tibetan festival called Dajyur takes place at Damxung at the beginning of the eighth month of the lunar calendar (solar September) for ten days of festivity attracting nomads to compete in horse racing and yak racing events, bicycle riding contests, rock-carrying competitions and other forms of merriment.

From Dangquka a highway starts to the sacred lake of Namtso, 60 km away.

"On March 25 [2005], the city published a government decree outlawing production, sale and use of non-biodegradable plastic food containers and bags, replacing them with biodegradable materials such as paper. This took effect on May 1."

== See also ==
- Damxung County
- Dangxiong railway station
