= Namco Township =

Namco
- Township

Tibetan transcription(s)
  - Tibetan: གནམ་མཚོ།
  - Wylie transliteration: gnam mtsho

Chinese transcription(s)
  - Traditional: 纳木错乡
  - Pinyin: Nàmùcuò Xiāng
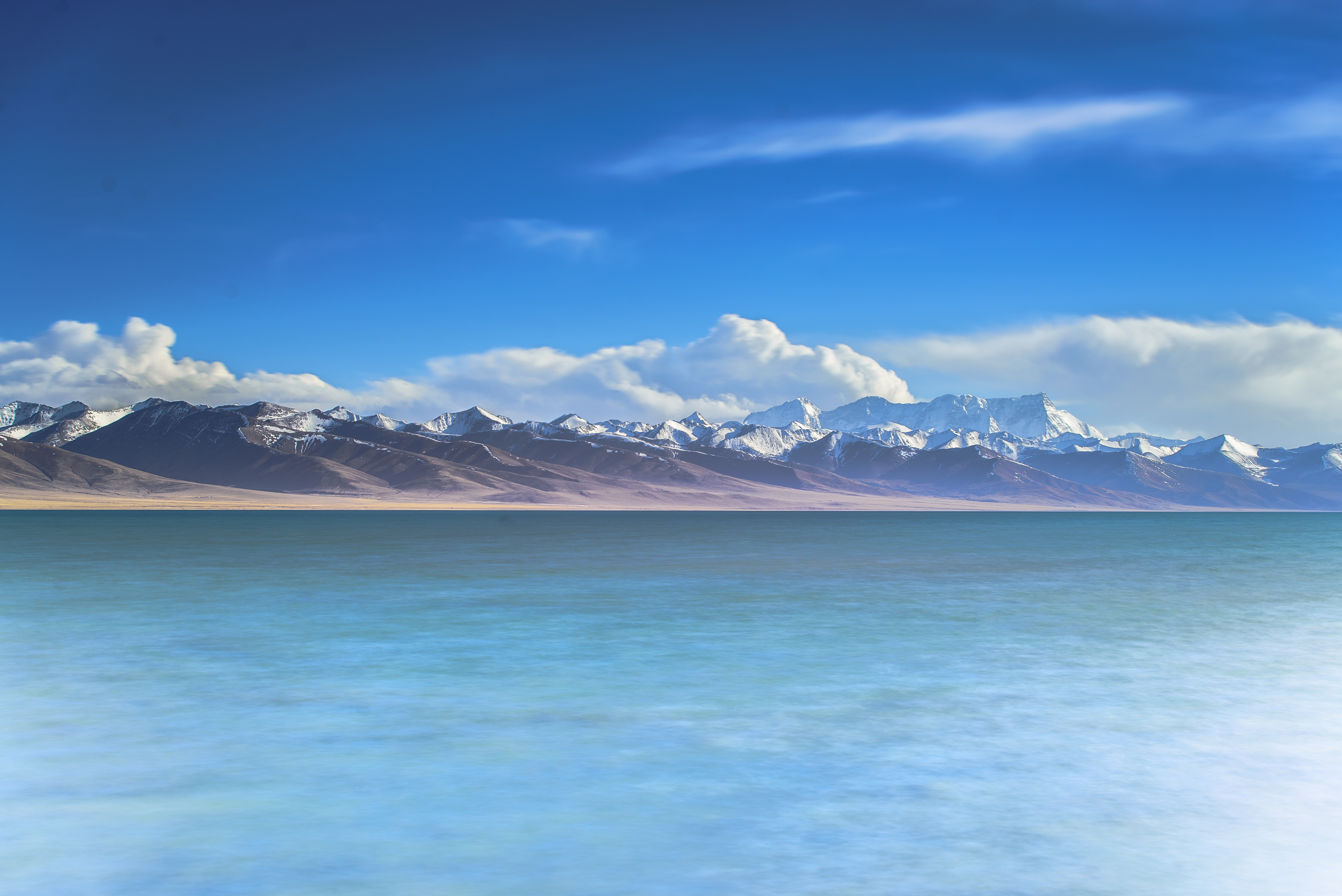

- Location within Tibet
- Coordinates: 30°55′N 91°07′E
- Country: China
- Province: Tibet Autonomous Region
- Prefecture: Lhasa Prefecture
- County: Damxung County
- Time zone: UTC+8 (CST)

Nam Co, also known as Namco or Namucuo, is a village and township in Damxung County in the Lhasa Prefecture of Tibet. Known for its scenic vistas around Nam Co Lake, it has an extremely high altitude of 4,700 metres (15,400 ft) to 4,800 metres (15,700 ft) above sea level.

== Population ==
As of 2009, the local population was about 1,000. The population density in Nam Co is very low.

The largest town in the vicinity is Damxung, which is approximately 50 km (31 mi) away.

== Economy ==
The traditional source of income in Nam Co is animal husbandry – specifically, herding sheep and yaks. In recent years, the local economy has benefited from increased tourism.

Tourism to Nam Co grew in the 1990s and increased significantly starting in 2006, when the Qinghai–Tibet railway became operational. Most tourism is concentrated around Zaxi Island. Annual visitors to Zaxi Island increased from 35,000 in 2006 to 791,000 in 2015.

Most herdsmen in Nam Co supplement their family income by selling specialty products such as yogurt and highland mushrooms.

== Lifestyle ==
Most villagers have a nomadic lifestyle and many live in traditional Tibetan tents made of yak hair. Herdsmen live by the water, migrating with their flocks of yak and sheep between the south shore of Namtso lake in the summer and the lower northern pastures in the winter. The primary fuel source in Nam Co is yak dung.

The winter grasslands now offer access to masonry buildings with electricity and wells. Residents participating in the tourism industry have established fixed or semi-fixed households.

== Local government ==
To combat water pollution caused by increased tourist traffic to Zaxi Island, the local government has installed garbage bins, increased cleaning staff, deployed garbage trucks, and built sewage tratment plants.

== Gallery ==
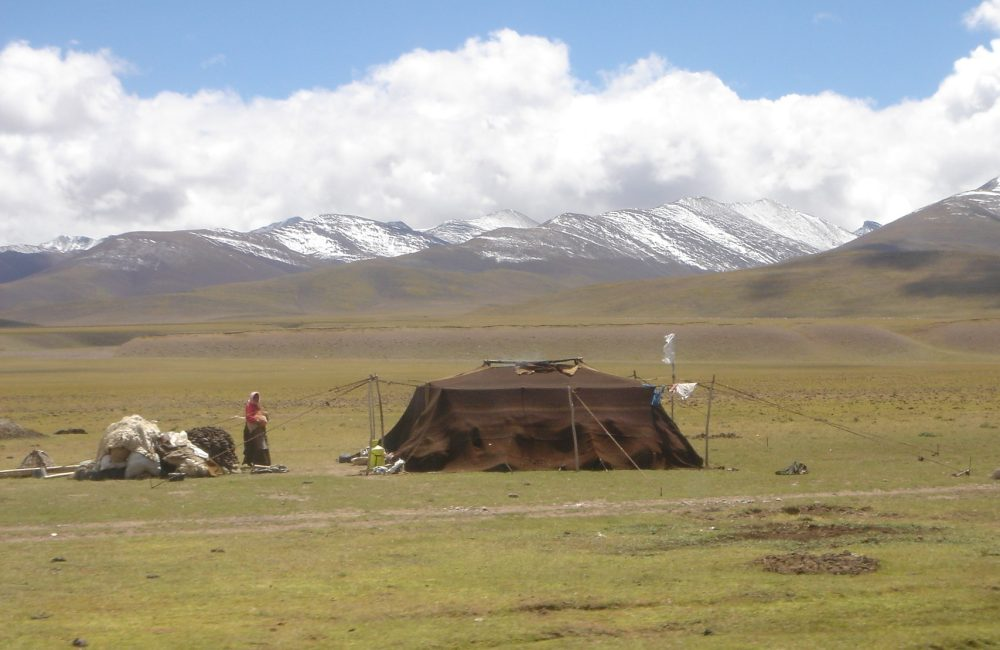
Traditional tent (2005)

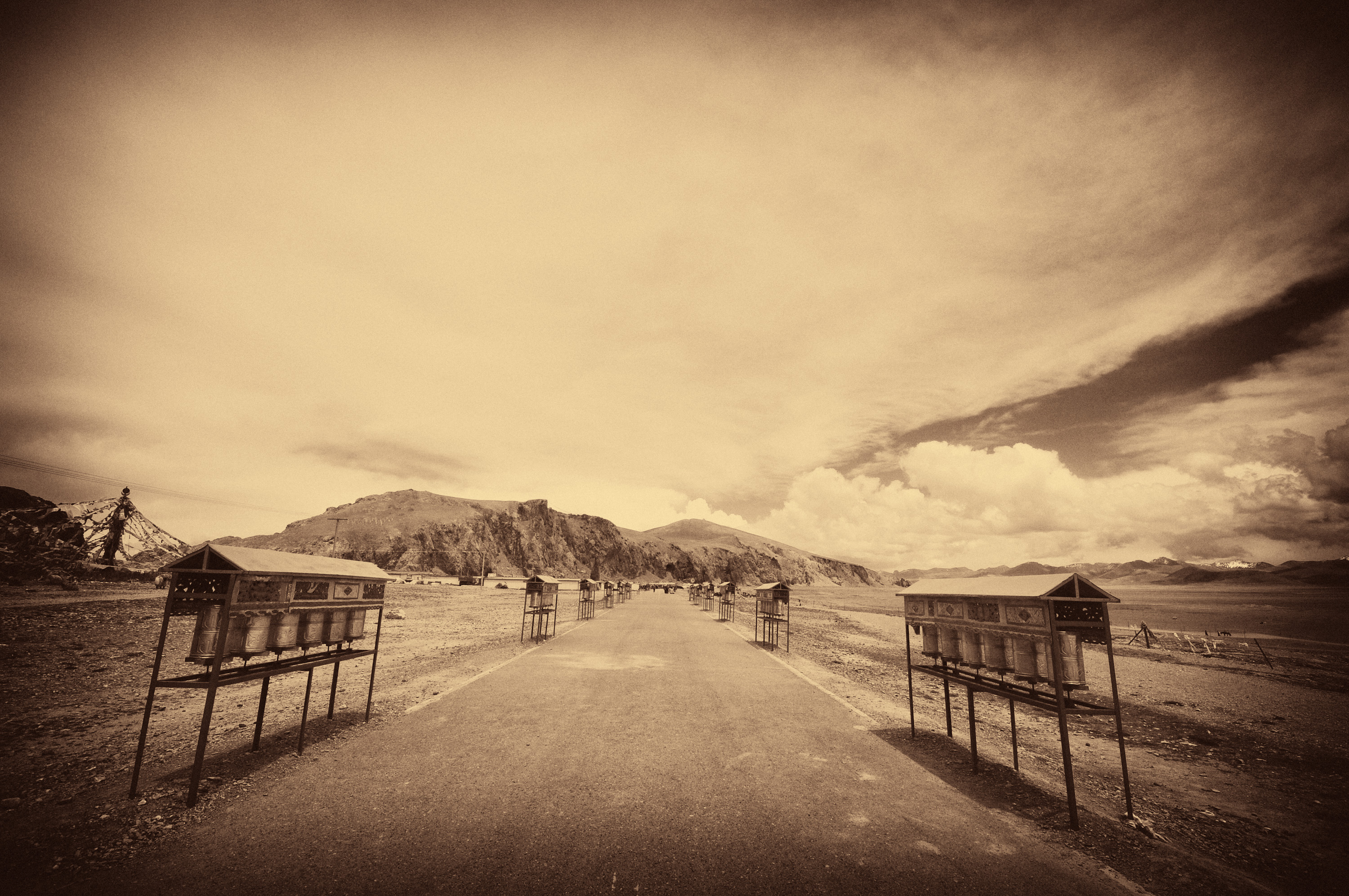
2009

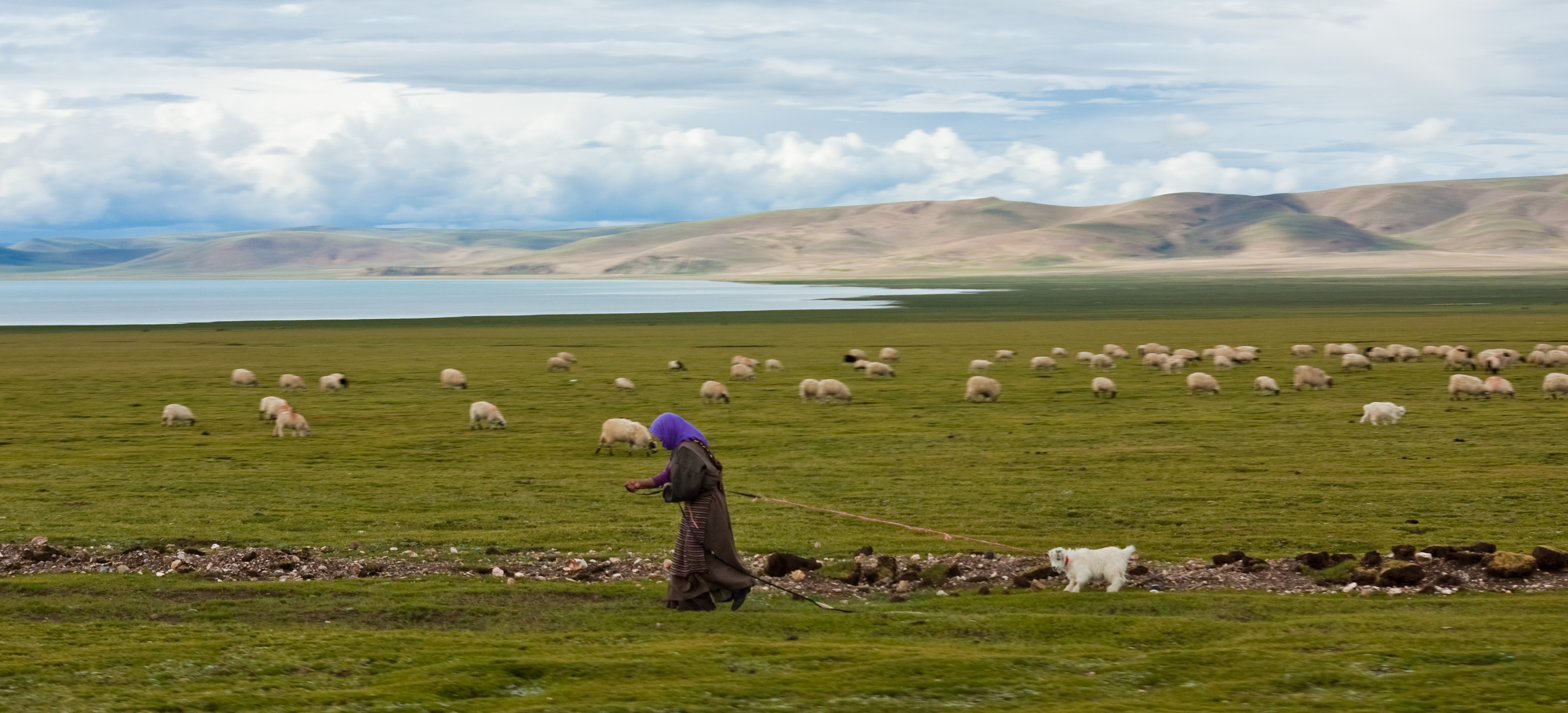
Woman with sheep (2009)

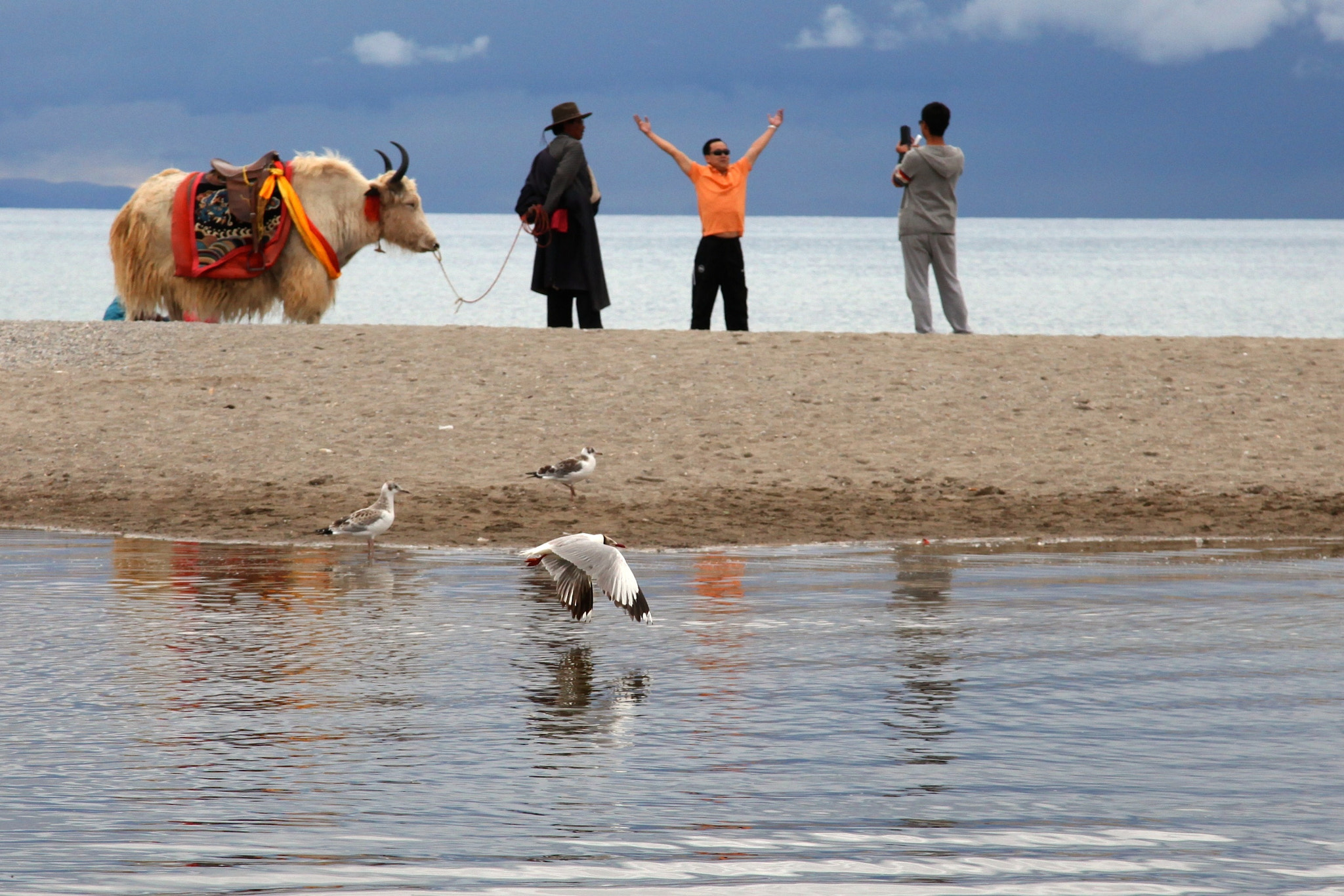
Tourists in 2013

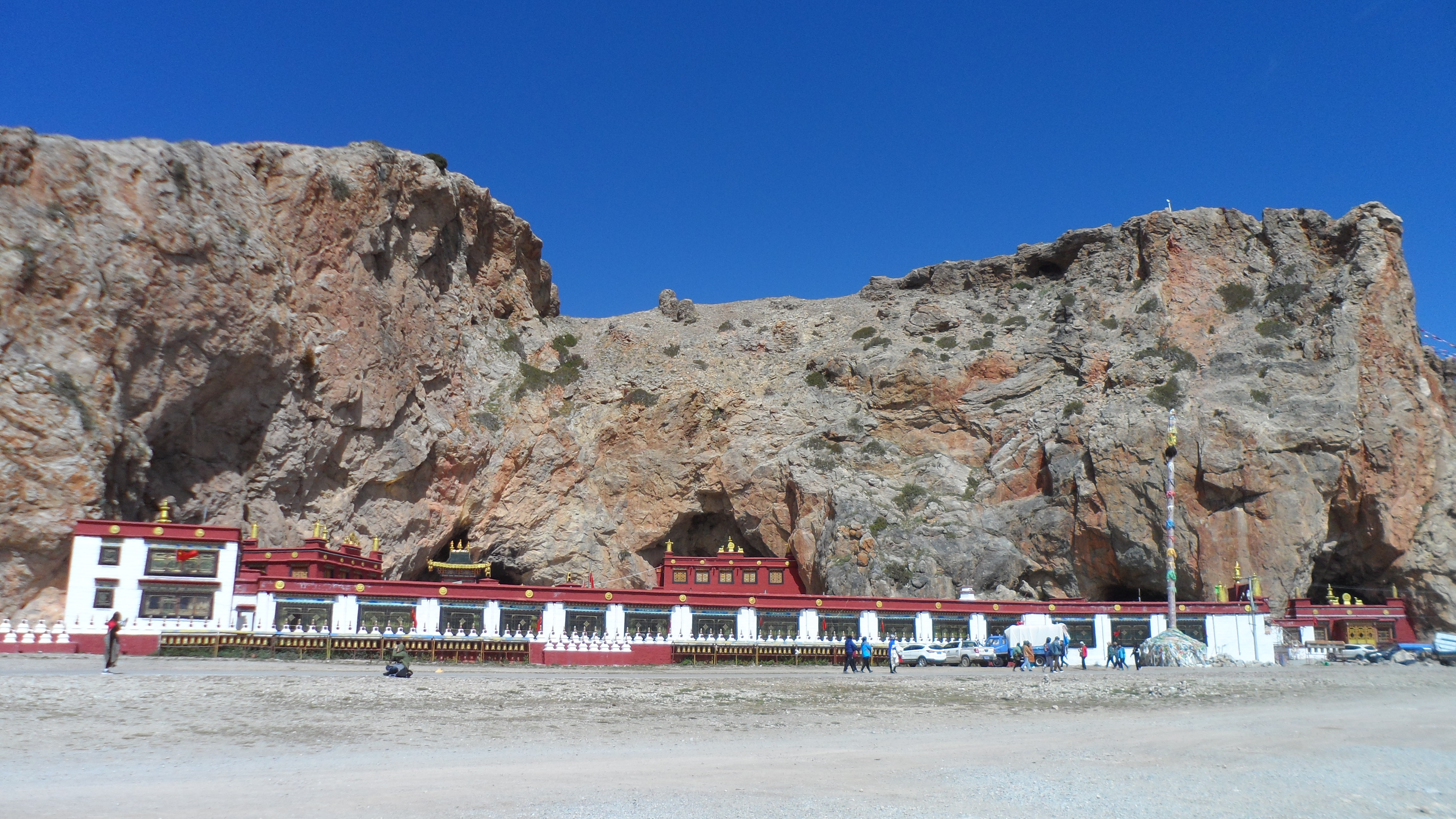
2019
