= Laken La =

Tibet mountain pass

- ལ་གེན་ལ
- Elevation stone at Laken La

- Location within Tibet
- Elevation: 5,190 metres (17,030 ft)
- Traversed by: Tibet Provincial Road S206

Third Approach
- Location: Damxung, Lhasa, Tibet, China
- Range: Nyenchen Tanglha Mountains
- Coordinates: 30°40′53″N 91°05′50″E

Laken La (Chinese: 那根拉山口; Tibetan: ལ་གེན་ལ, Wylie: lagen la) is a mountain pass at Damxung, north-west of Lhasa near the second-largest salt lake in Qinghai-Tibetan Plateau, Namtso Lake. It has an elevation of 5,190 m (17,030 ft).
