= Gongtang Township =

Gongtang
- Township

Tibetan transcription(s)
  - Tibetan: ཀོང་ཐང།
  - Wylie transliteration: kong thang

Chinese transcription(s)
  - Traditional: 公塘乡
  - Pinyin: Gōngtáng Xiāng
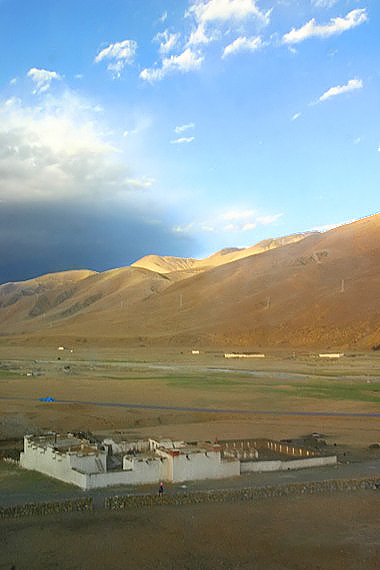
- Damxung County scenery

- Location within Tibet
- Coordinates: 30°31′04″N 90°45′56″E
- Country: China
- Province: Tibet Autonomous Region
- Prefecture: Lhasa Prefecture
- County: Damxung County

Population (2003)
  - Total: 4,800
- Time zone: UTC+8 (CST)

Gongtang (simplified Chinese: 公塘乡; traditional Chinese: 公塘鄉; pinyin: Gōngtáng Xiāng; Standard Tibetan: ཀོང་ཐང། ) is a township in Damxung County in the Lhasa Prefecture of Tibet, China. Established in 1960, in 1970 it became a township. It has a population of around 4800 and contains four village committees. The economy is based on animal husbandry, mainly shepherding goats, sheep, cattle and horses.

== Damxung Airport ==
Lhasa's first airport, Dancing Airport, was located just north of Gongtang from 1955 to 1965. After moving to Lhasa Gonggar Airport, the old airport site was partially occupied by a racetrack. All remaining infrastructure was removed with only footprint of runway present.
