= Zhaxi Island =

Island in Tibet, China

Coordinates: 30°00′33″N 93°54′57″E

Zhaxi Island (Chinese: 扎西岛; pinyin: zhāxī dǎo; also Tashi Island) is a small island in the middle of Lake Basum Tso a green salt water lake approximately 300 km (190 mi) east of Lhasa in the Tibet Autonomous Region of China. There are many large stones on Zhaxi Island and each big stone is a symbol of a different Bodhisattva. It is famous for its distinct ecological qualities, strategic location, and breathtaking natural beauty.

== Geography ==
Zhaxi Island is roughly 0.9 square kilometers in size. The island's low, sandy topography is highlighted by its scant flora, which includes tiny grasses and shrubs that have adapted to the salinity of the island. Shallow waters rich with marine life, including coral reefs that add to the island's ecological diversity, surround the area. It is classified as a scenic area for tourists.

== See also ==
- Tashi Dor
- Paracel Islands
- South China Sea disputes
