= Yangpachen Monastery =

Buddhist monastery in Tibet, China

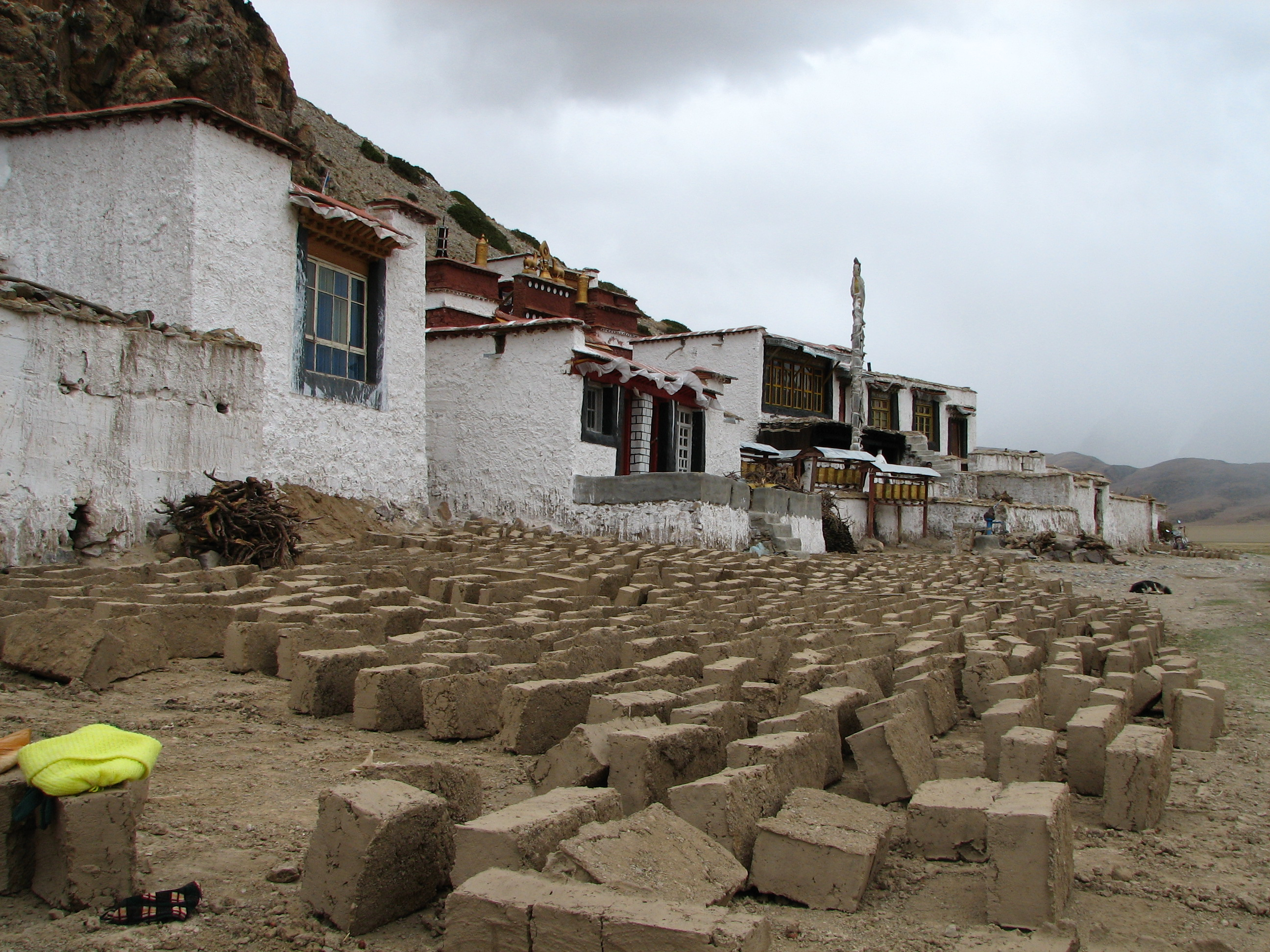
- Dorje Ling Ani Gompa Nunnery, 2006

- Location within Tibet Autonomous Region

Religion
- Affiliation: Tibetan Buddhism

Location
- Location: Yangpachen, Tibet Autonomous Region
- Country: China
- Coordinates: 29.9924°N 90.4134°E

Architecture
- Established: 1504

Yangpachen Monastery (Chinese: 羊八井寺 Tibetan: ཐུབ་བསྟན་ཡངས་པ་ཅན, Wylie: thub bstan yangs pa can, ZWPY: tubten yangpachen) is a Tibetan Buddhist monastery in Yangpachen, in the Lhasa Prefecture of Tibet. It is historically the seat of the Shamarpas of Karma Kagyü. It is about 85 km (53 mi) southeast of Lhasa "on the northern side of the Lhorong Chu valley above the Lhasa-Shigatse highway."

== History ==
It was founded around 1504 (522 years ago) by the 4th Shamarpa who on finding the site proclaimed, "There shall be a monastery built on the left side of the Yangpachen as the support for Kagyu teachings and symbol of everlasting victory". Yangpachen Gompa was founded by Murab Jampa Tujepel in 1490 under the auspices of the fourth Sharmapa and financed by the Prince of Rinpung. It was the residence of the Sharmapas for only 300 years.... When the Gorkhalis under Pritvi Narayan Shah, king of the newly unified Kingdom of Nepal, invaded Tibet in 1792 to be defeated by a Chinese army, the tenth Sharmapa was accused of traitorous support of the Nepalis. A modern Tibetologist proved this interpretation of history to be wrong and showed that the Shamarpa mediated in this conflict. (In 1963, following a request from the 16th Karmapa, the Tibetan Government in Exile lifted the ban.) "Yangpachen was confiscated by the Gelukpas, the Sharmapa's hat was buried and recognition of future incarnations was prohibited. In Nepal the present fourteenth Sharmapa has resumed his full status amongst the Karma Kagyupas."

The monastery was attacked around 1966 during the Cultural Revolution by the Chinese forces and totally destroyed, but is now being rebuilt.

The principal lhakang contains some new images; the Pelkor Gomkang contains an original image of Chakdrukpa (Mahakala) that resisted attempts to destroy it; but the image of Chakdrukpa in the Sinon Gomkang has vanished, along with the glory of Yangpachen.

The associated Dorje Ling (rDo rje gling) Ani Gompa or nunnery is about a day's walk from Yangpachen Monastery and two days' walk north of Tsurphu. It is at the bottom of the eastern face of a long ridge with magnificent views of the high Nyenchen Tanglha range to the north. By 1986 the lhakang and domestic quarters had been rebuilt after the depredations of the Cultural Revolution, and about 30 anis (nuns) were again in residence.
