= Namtso =

Namtso / Namco
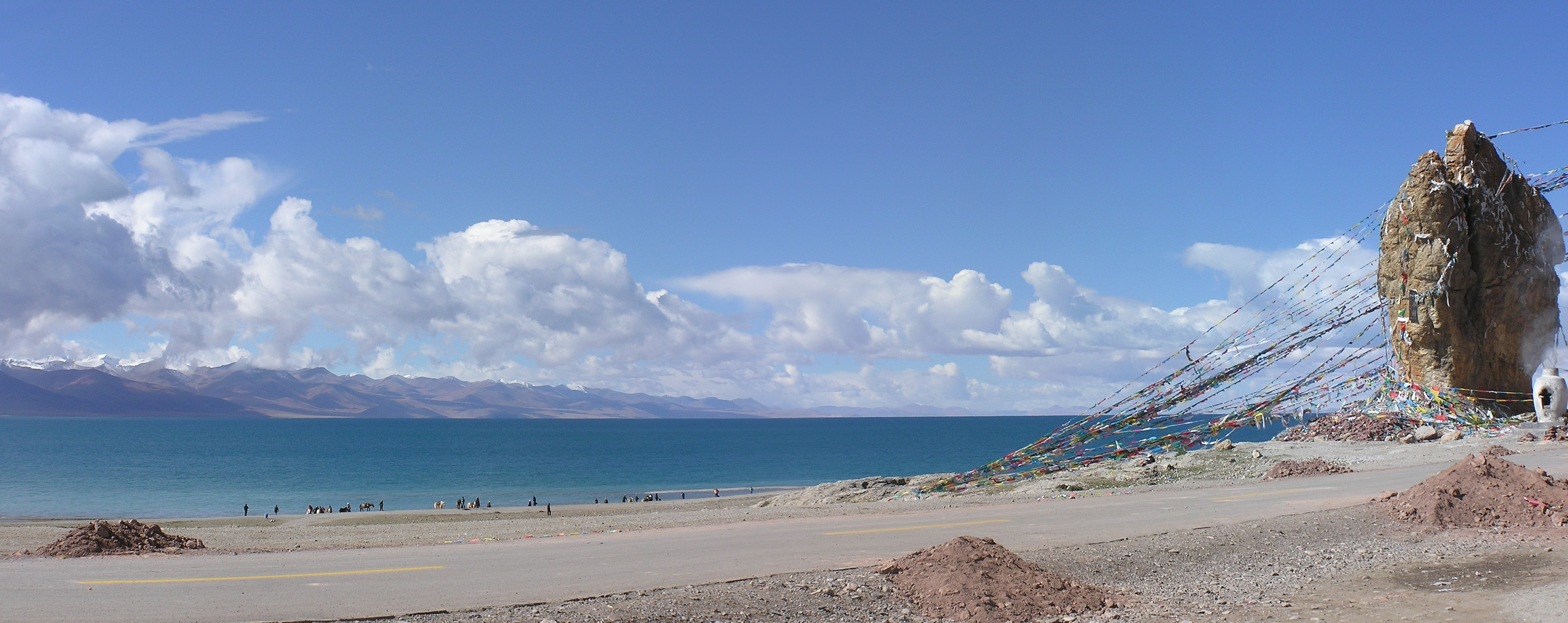
- View of the lake and the holy rock near the Tashi Dor monastery (2005)

- Location within Tibet

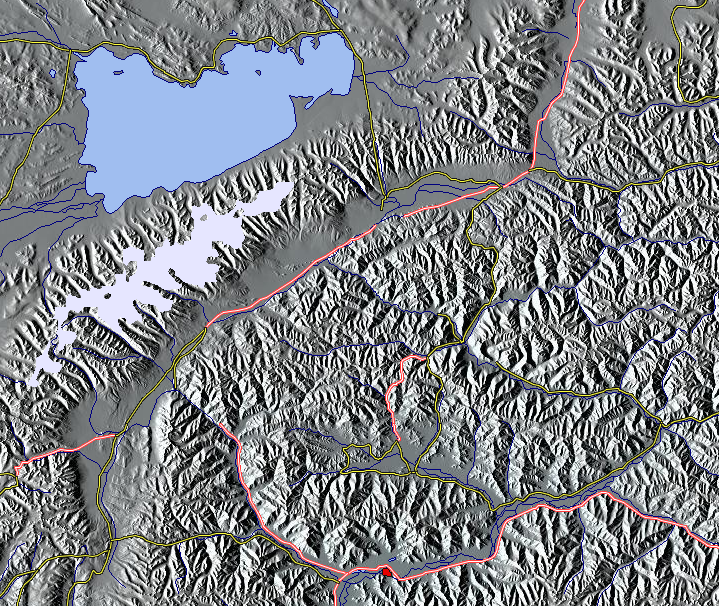
- Relief map. Lhasa is the area marked in red at the bottom.
- Location: Damxung/Baingoin, Tibet Autonomous Region
- Coordinates: 30°42′N 90°33′E
- Type: salt lake
- Primary inflows: snow cover and spring of Tanggula Mountains
- Primary outflows: None (endorheic)
- Basin countries: People's Republic of China
- Max. length: 70 km (43 mi)
- Max. width: 30 km (19 mi)
- Surface area: 1,920 km^{2} (740 sq mi)
- Average depth: 33 m (108 ft)
- Max. depth: 125 m (410 ft)
- Water volume: 768 billion cubic metres (623×10^{6} acre⋅ft)
- Surface elevation: 4,718 m (15,479 ft)
- Islands: 5

- Namtso

Tibetan name
- Tibetan: གནམ་མཚོ་
Transcriptions
- Wylie: gnam mtsho
- THL: Namtso
- Tibetan Pinyin: Nam Co
- Lhasa IPA: [namtsʰo]

Chinese name
- Traditional Chinese: 納木錯
- Simplified Chinese: 纳木错
Transcriptions
Standard Mandarin
- Hanyu Pinyin: Nàmù Cuò

Namtso (officially Namco; Chinese: 纳木错; pinyin: Nàmù Cuò; Tibetan: གནམ་མཚོ་, ZWPY: Nam Co) or Lake Nam (30°42′N 90°33′E), also referred to as Tengri Nor ('Heavenly Lake'; Mongolian: Tenger nuur), is a mountain lake on the border between Damxung County of Lhasa prefecture-level city and Baingoin County of Nagqu Prefecture in the Tibet Autonomous Region of China, approximately 112 kilometres (70 mi) NNW of Lhasa. It lies north of the Nyenchen Tanglha Mountains (Nyainqêntanglha) on the Tibetan Plateau.

== Geography ==
Namtso (Namco) is a lake that first formed during the Paleogene age, as a result of Himalayan tectonic plate movements. The lake lies at an elevation of 4,718 m (15,479 ft), and has a surface area of 1,900 km^{2} (730 sq mi). This salt lake is the largest lake in the Tibet Autonomous Region. However, it is not the largest lake on the Qinghai-Tibet Plateau. That title belongs to Qinghai Lake (more than twice the size of Namtso); which lies more than 1,000 km (620 mi) to the north-east in Qinghai.

Namtso has five uninhabited islands of reasonable size, in addition to one or two rocky outcrops. The islands have been used for spiritual retreat by pilgrims who walk over the lake's frozen surface at the end of winter, carrying their food with them. They spend the summer there, unable to return to shore again until the water freezes the following winter. This practice is no longer permitted by Chinese authorities.

The largest of the islands is in the northwest corner of the lake, and is about 2,100 m (6,900 ft) long and 800 m (2,600 ft) wide, rising to just over 100 m (330 ft) in the middle. At its closest point it is about 3.1 km (1.9 mi) from the shore.

== Climate ==
The weather at Namtso is subject to abrupt, sudden change and snowstorms are very common across the Nyenchen Tanglha mountain range.

Namtso has an alpine climate (Köppen ETH) characterised by frigid, extremely dry winters and cool, rainy summers.

Climate data for Namtso (Namco)
Month	Jan	Feb	Mar	Apr	May	Jun	Jul	Aug	Sep	Oct	Nov	Dec	Year
Mean daily maximum °C (°F)	−3.0 (26.6)	−1.4 (29.5)	1.7 (35.1)	5.6 (42.1)	10.0 (50.0)	14.0 (57.2)	14.4 (57.9)	13.4 (56.1)	11.7 (53.1)	6.5 (43.7)	1.4 (34.5)	−1.7 (28.9)	6.1 (42.9)
Daily mean °C (°F)	−11.8 (10.8)	−9.6 (14.7)	−6.1 (21.0)	−1.7 (28.9)	2.9 (37.2)	7.3 (45.1)	8.4 (47.1)	7.7 (45.9)	5.6 (42.1)	−0.3 (31.5)	−6.8 (19.8)	−10.5 (13.1)	−1.2 (29.8)
Mean daily minimum °C (°F)	−20.6 (−5.1)	−17.8 (0.0)	−13.8 (7.2)	−9.0 (15.8)	−4.2 (24.4)	0.7 (33.3)	2.5 (36.5)	2.1 (35.8)	−0.4 (31.3)	−7.1 (19.2)	−14.9 (5.2)	−19.3 (−2.7)	−8.5 (16.7)
Average precipitation mm (inches)	1 (0.0)	1 (0.0)	1 (0.0)	4 (0.2)	14 (0.6)	51 (2.0)	87 (3.4)	87 (3.4)	48 (1.9)	10 (0.4)	2 (0.1)	1 (0.0)	307 (12)
Source: "NAMTSO QU Climate (China)". Climate-Data.org.

== Other features ==
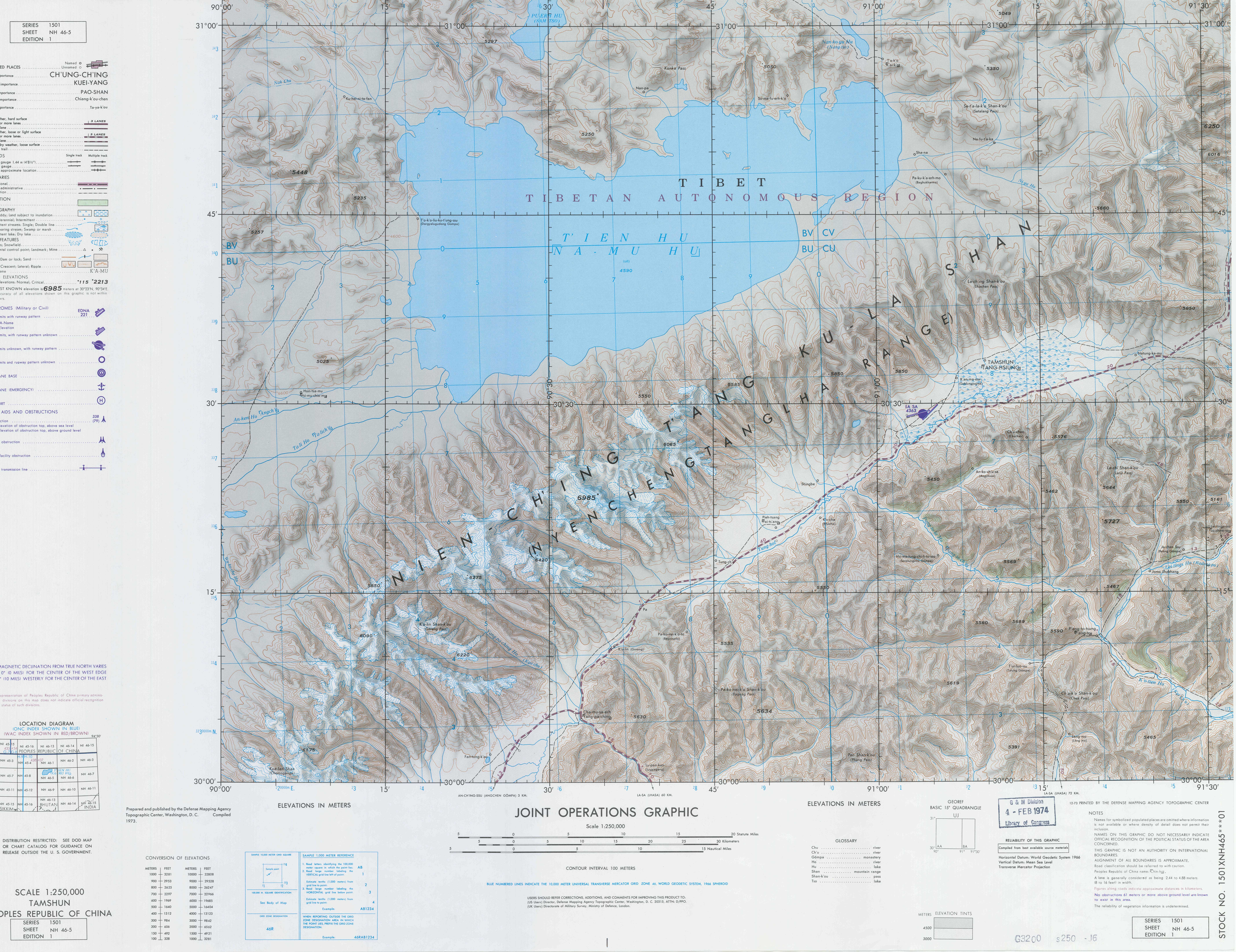
NH-46-5 Nam Tso China

Namtso is renowned as one of the most beautiful places in the Nyenchen Tanglha mountain range. Its cave hermitages have for centuries been the destination of Tibetan pilgrims. The caves around Namtso are traditionally associated with Padmasambhava, an Indian Buddhist master, and Yeshe Tsogyal. A surfaced road across Laken Pass at 5186 m was completed to the lake in 2005, enabling easy access from Lhasa and the development of tourism at the lake. Settlements in the area include Dobjoi, Donggar and Cha'gyungoinba. The Tashi Dor monastery is located at the southeastern corner of the lake.

Around the area's natural elements, historical and anthropological background, a 2010 romantic drama Chinese: 香格里拉 Shangri-La, starring China's popular actor Hu Ge, was broadcast at CCTV1 and received positive reviews. Some scenes in the 2002 Hong Kong film The Touch were filmed at the lake. Namtso Lake was featured in Episode 4, The Roof of the World, of BBC TV series: Himalaya with Michael Palin.

== Gallery ==
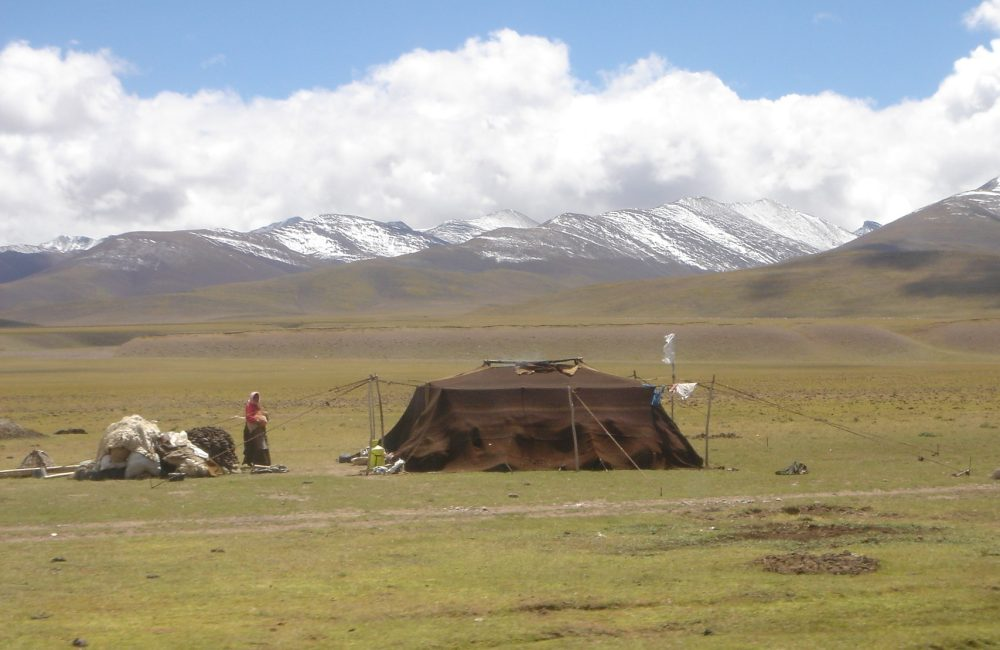
Traditional tent (2005). Pastoral nomads camping near Namtso

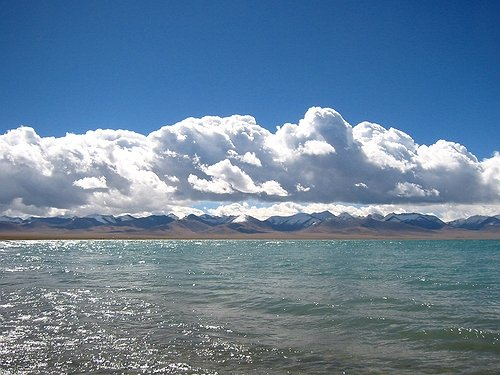
Namtso at summer time

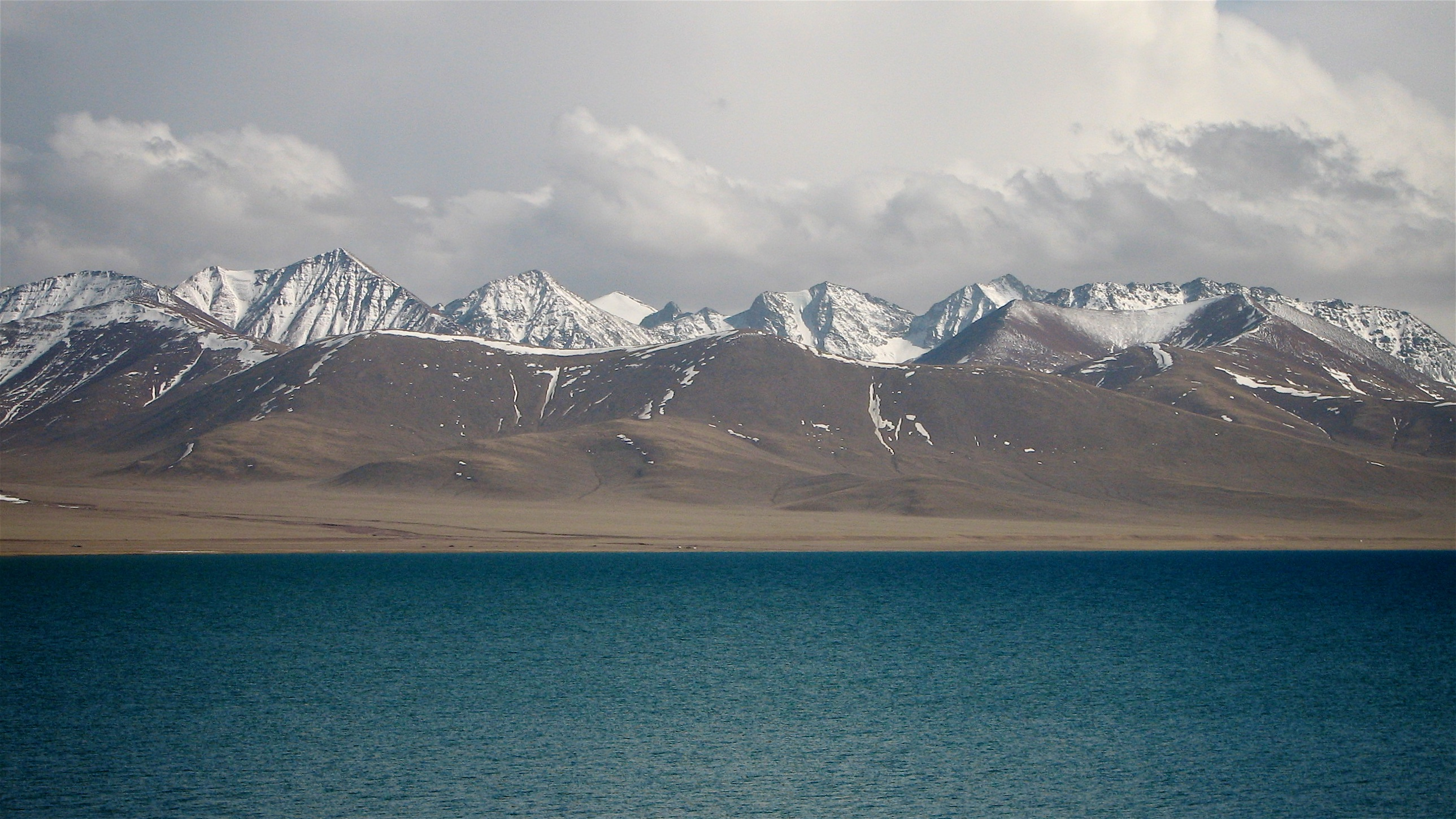
Namtso Lake with the Nyenchen Tanglha mountains in the background.

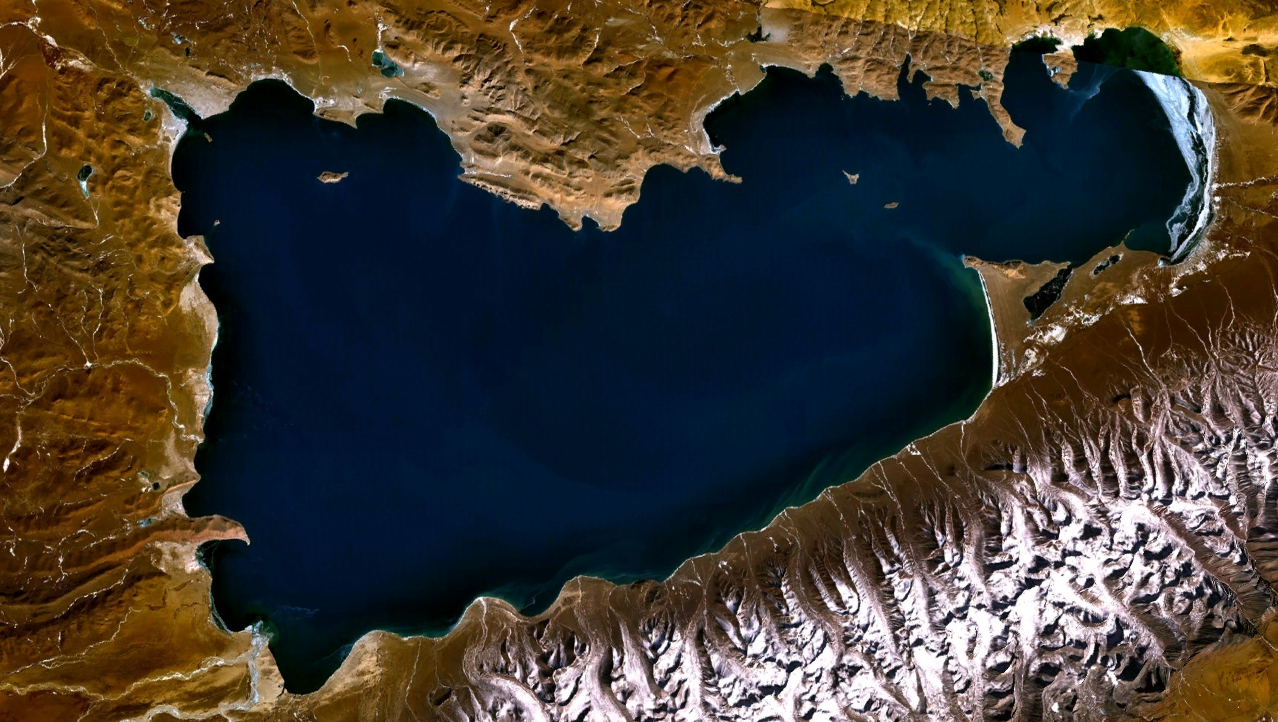
Namtso from space

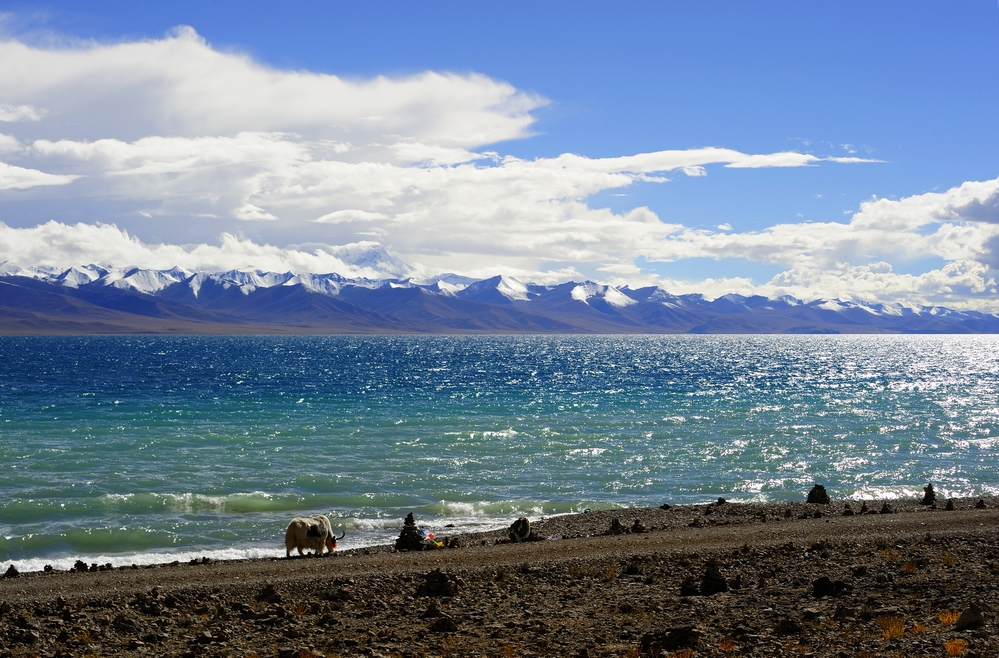
Namtso, Damxung County

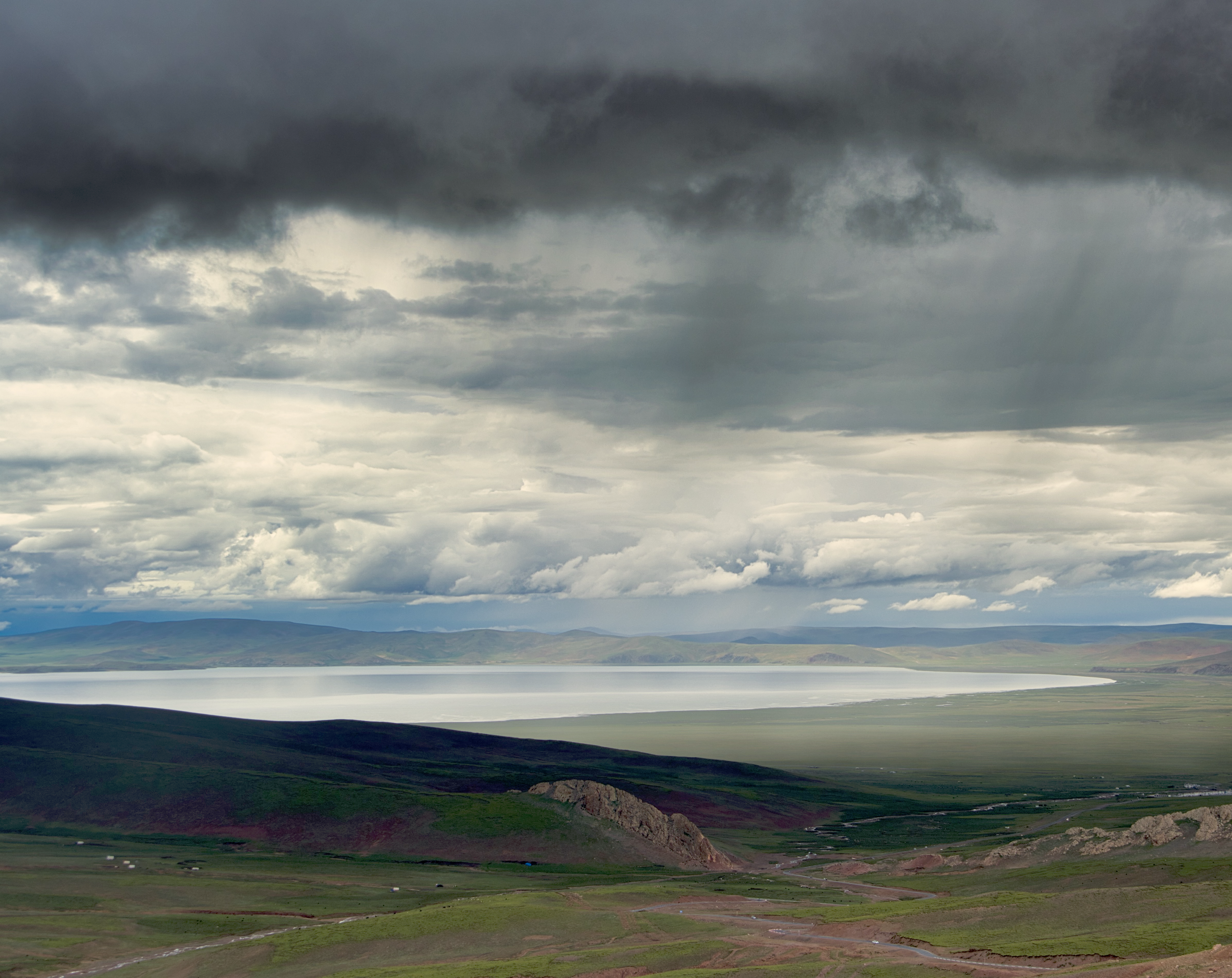
Namtso seen from the Laken La

== Asteroid ==
Asteroid 248388 Namtso, discovered by Italian astronomer Vincenzo Casulli in 2005, was named after the lake. The official naming citation was published by the Minor Planet Center on 5 October 2017 (M.P.C. 106504).

== See also ==
- Namco Township
- Gomang Co
- Kanas Lake
- Lake Urru
- Laken Pass (Lakenla)
- Siling Lake
