= Tashi Dor =

Peninsula in Tibet, China

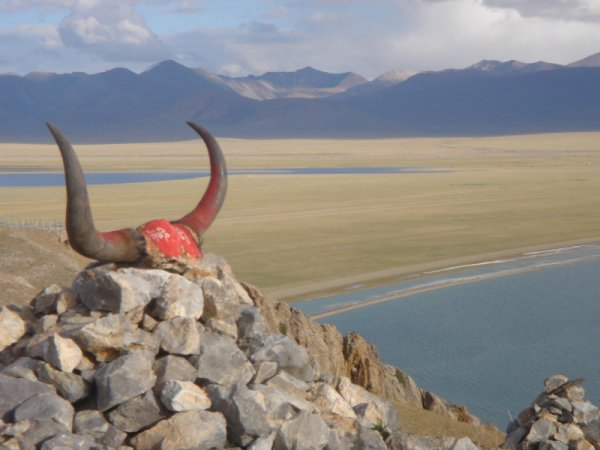
view from Tashi Dor

Tashi Dor (30.774°N 90.891°E; simplified Chinese: 扎西半岛; traditional Chinese: 札西半島) is a peninsula protruding into Namtso Lake from its south-eastern corner, in the Tibetan Region of China.

On the peninsula is Tashi Monastery and several hermit caves. Nomadic herders frequently camp on the peninsula, and many species of migratory birds make their home there. The 2005 completion of a paved road linking Tashi Dor with Lhasa, to the south, has facilitated the rapid expansion of tourist-oriented facilities on the peninsula.
