= Sanga Monastery =

Tibetan Buddhist monastery in Dêqên, Tibet, China

- Chinese transcription(s); Simplified: 桑阿寺; Pinyin: Sāngāsì
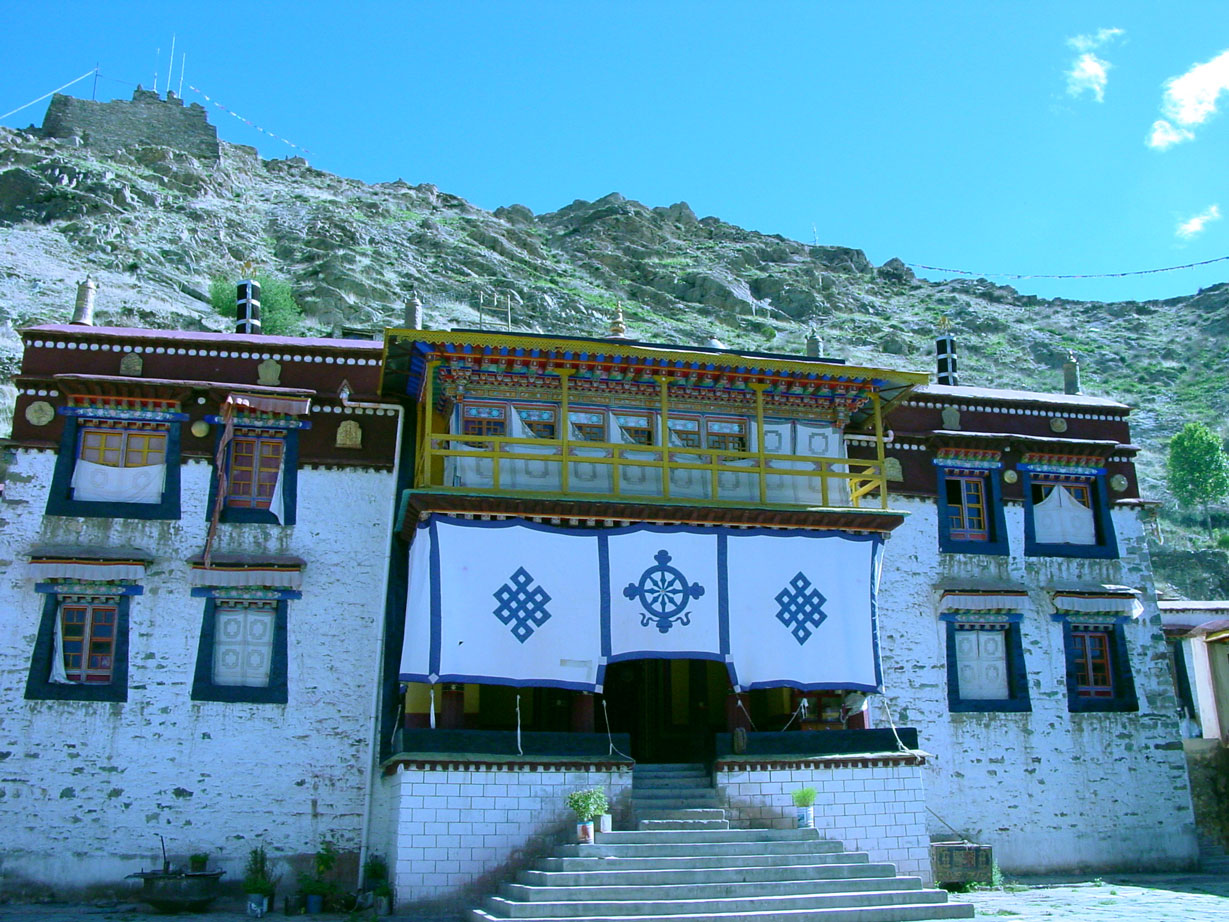
- Front of the monastery

- Location within Tibet

Religion
- Affiliation: Tibetan Buddhism
- Sect: Gelug

Location
- Location: Dagzê, Dagzê, Lhasa, Tibet, China
- Country: China
- Interactive map of Sanga Monastery
- Coordinates: 29.671961°N 91.357648°E

Architecture
- Established: 1419; 607 years ago

Sanga Monastery is a small Tibetan Buddhist monastery located in the town of Dagzê in Dagzê County, Lhasa, Tibet.

== Location ==
Sanga Monastery is located in the center of the old city of Dagzê. The temple grounds cover about 15 acres (6.1 ha), and the building covers 2,343 square metres (25,220 sq ft). The Lhasa River can be seen from the rear of the monastery. Diagonally above the monastery on the hillside are the ruins of a hilltop fort. This is the ruin of Dagtse Dzong, or Dechen Dzong. Dzong means "fort".

== History ==
The monastery was built by Je Tsongkhapa in 1419. It is part of the Gelug sect, and is under the jurisdiction of Ganden Monastery. At its height there were one hundred monks in residence. During the Cultural Revolution the temple lost many artifacts, and buildings were destroyed. In November 1986 the monastery was re-opened after repairs. In 2012 there were over thirty monks in residence. That year a bathhouse was installed for the first time. The monastery has a greenhouse.

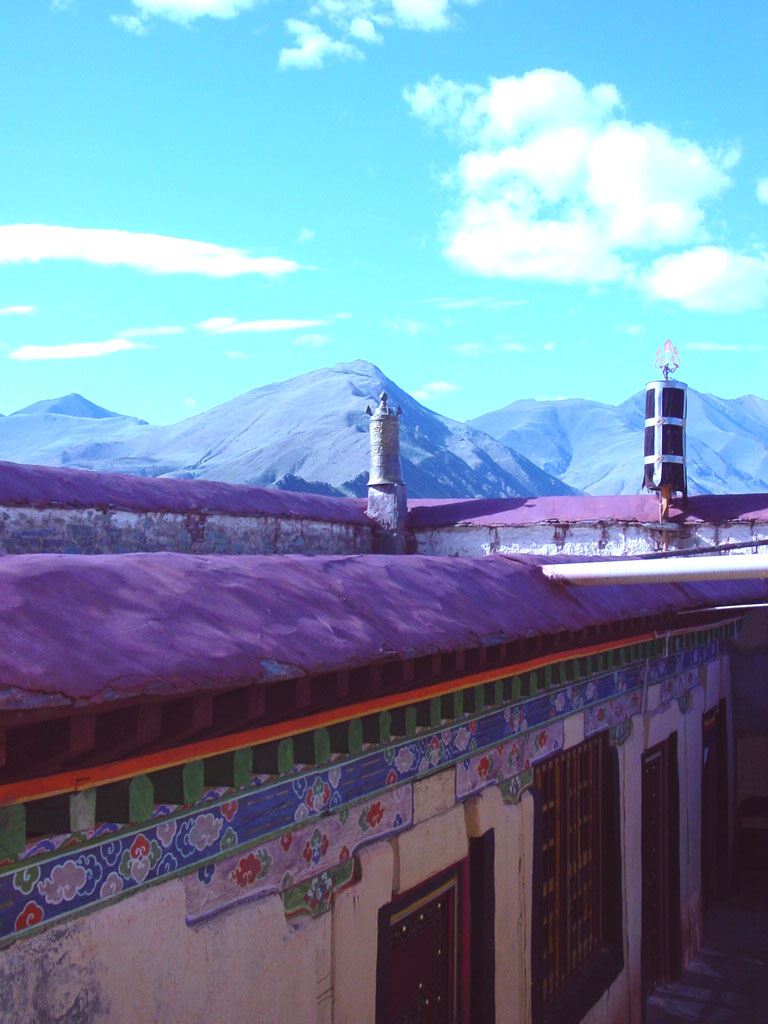
Roof of Sanga Monastery

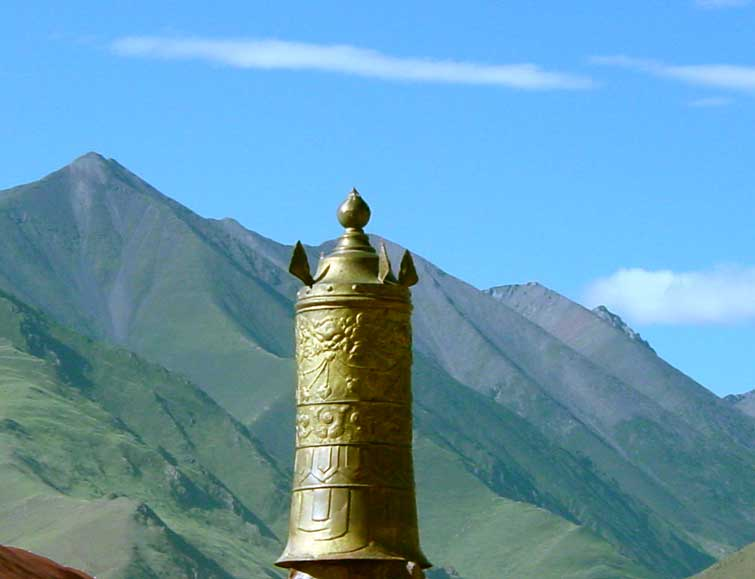
Dhvaja (Victory banner), Roof of Sanga Monastery

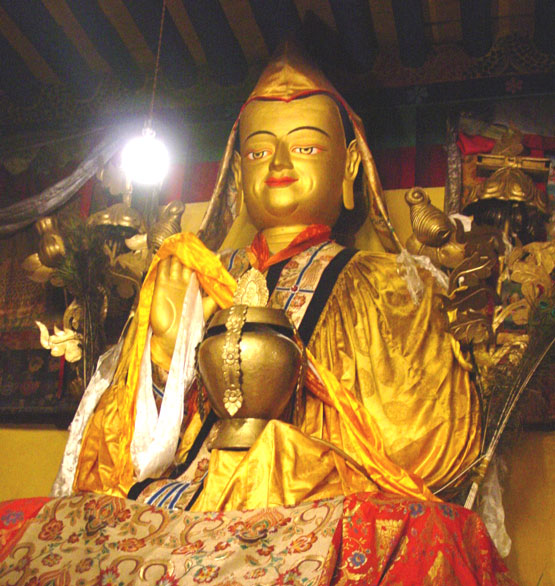
Statue of the 5th Dalai Lama, Lobsang Gyatso

== Sources ==
- Kelly, Robert; Bellezza, John Vincent (2008). Tibet. Ediz. Inglese. Lonely Planet. ISBN 978-1-74104-569-7.
- landyliao (2014-04-08). "Wonderful blessed Sanga Monastery". isfashion.com. Archived from the original on 2015-02-25.
- Tian Zhilin (2012-10-08). "Tibetan monks of Dazi Sanga: Government does practical things for the temple". Chinese national newspaper (in Chinese).
- Tibet Daily (2012-09-23). "Let the people of all nationalities share the results of reform and development". Phoenix New Media.
