= Deqen =

Deqen may refer to:

- Dêqên Tibetan Autonomous Prefecture (Diqing), in Yunnan, China
- Dêqên County (Deqin), in Yunnan, China
- Dêqên, Dagzê County, township in Dagzê County, Lhasa
- Dêqên, Doilungdêqên County, township in Doilungdêqên County, Lhasa
