= Dagzê, Lhasa =

Dagzê 达孜区 • སྟག་རྩེ་ཆུས།
- District
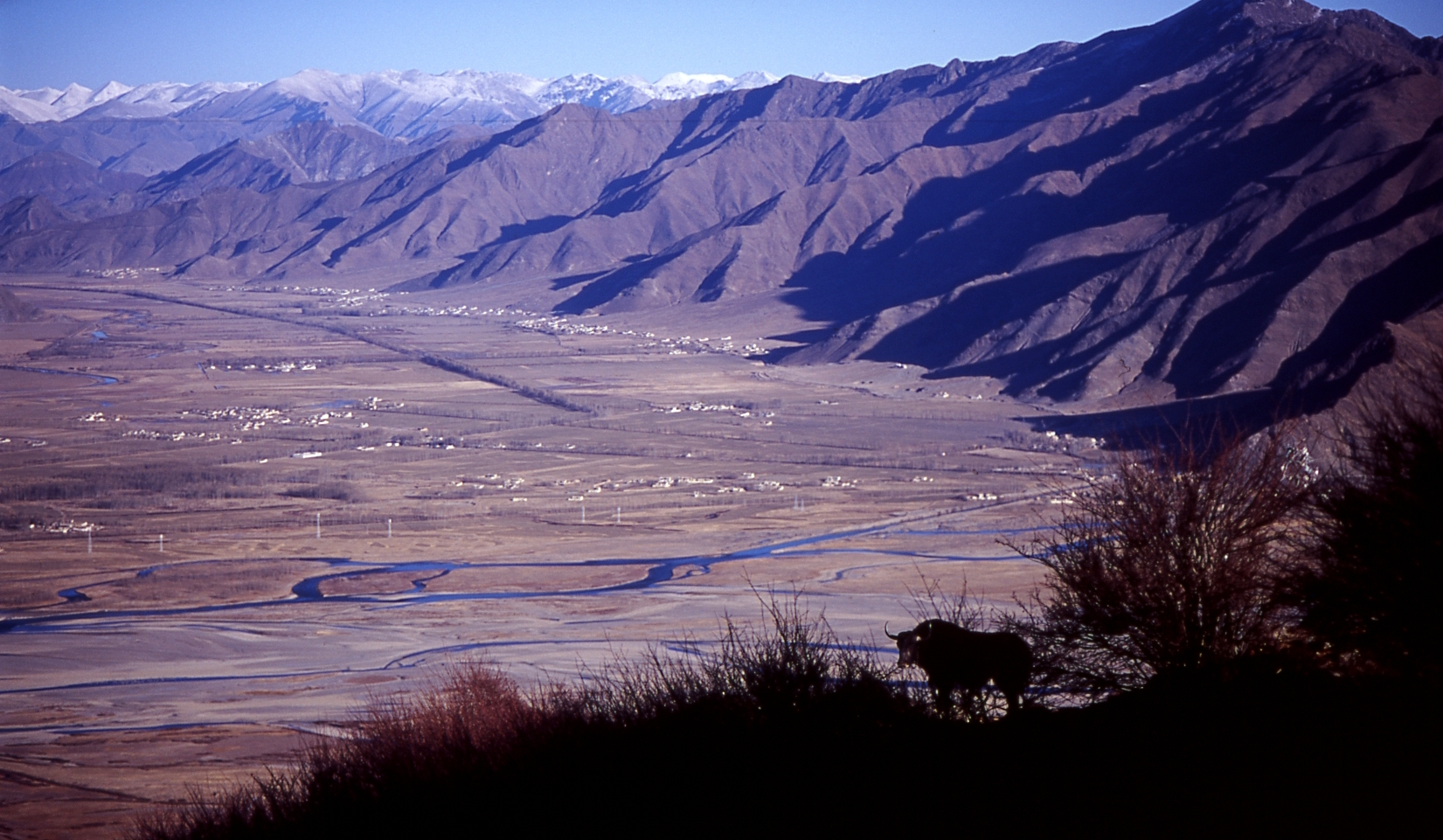
- A view from Ganden Monastery

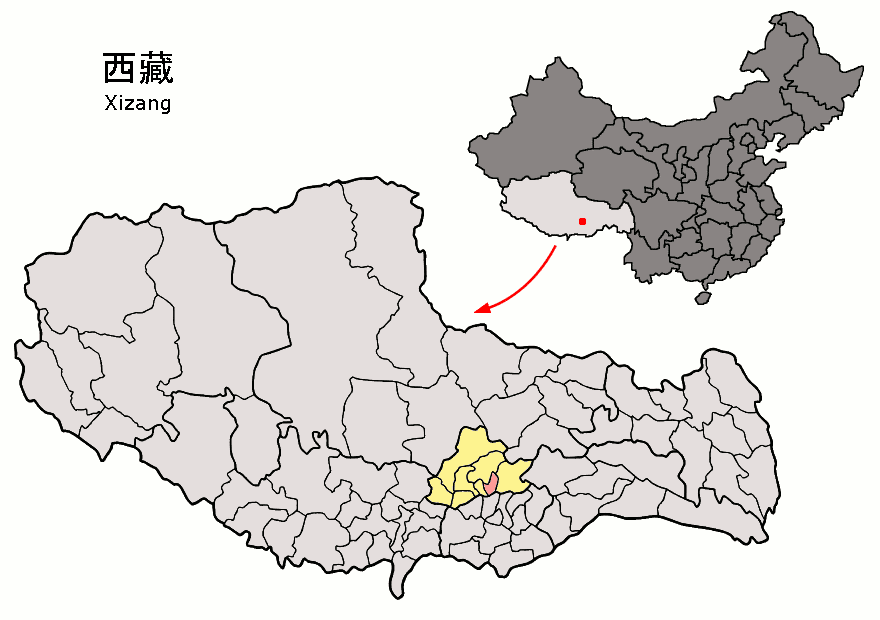
- Location of Dagzê District (red) within Lhasa City (yellow) and the Tibet A.R.
- Interactive map of Dagzê
- Location in Tibet Autonomous Region Dagzê (China)
- Coordinates: 29.672447°N 91.352817°E
- Country: China
- Autonomous region: Tibet
- Prefecture-level city: Lhasa
- District seat: Dêqên

Area
  - Total: 1,373 km^{2} (530 sq mi)

Population (2020)
  - Total: 32,318
  - Density: 23.54/km^{2} (60.96/sq mi)
- Time zone: UTC+8 (China Standard)
- Website: www.dzq.gov.cn

Dagzê, Lhasa

Chinese name
- Simplified Chinese: 达孜区
- Traditional Chinese: 達孜區
Transcriptions
Standard Mandarin
- Hanyu Pinyin: Dázī Qū

Tibetan name
- Tibetan: སྟག་རྩེ་་ཆུས།
Transcriptions
- Wylie: stag rtse chus
- Tibetan Pinyin: Dagzê Qü

Dagzê District is a district of Lhasa immediately east of the district of Chengguan, Tibet. The Lhasa River runs through the district. As of 2013 the total population was 29,152, mostly ethnic Tibetans engaged in agriculture. The district is home to the Ganden and Yerpa monasteries.

== Location ==
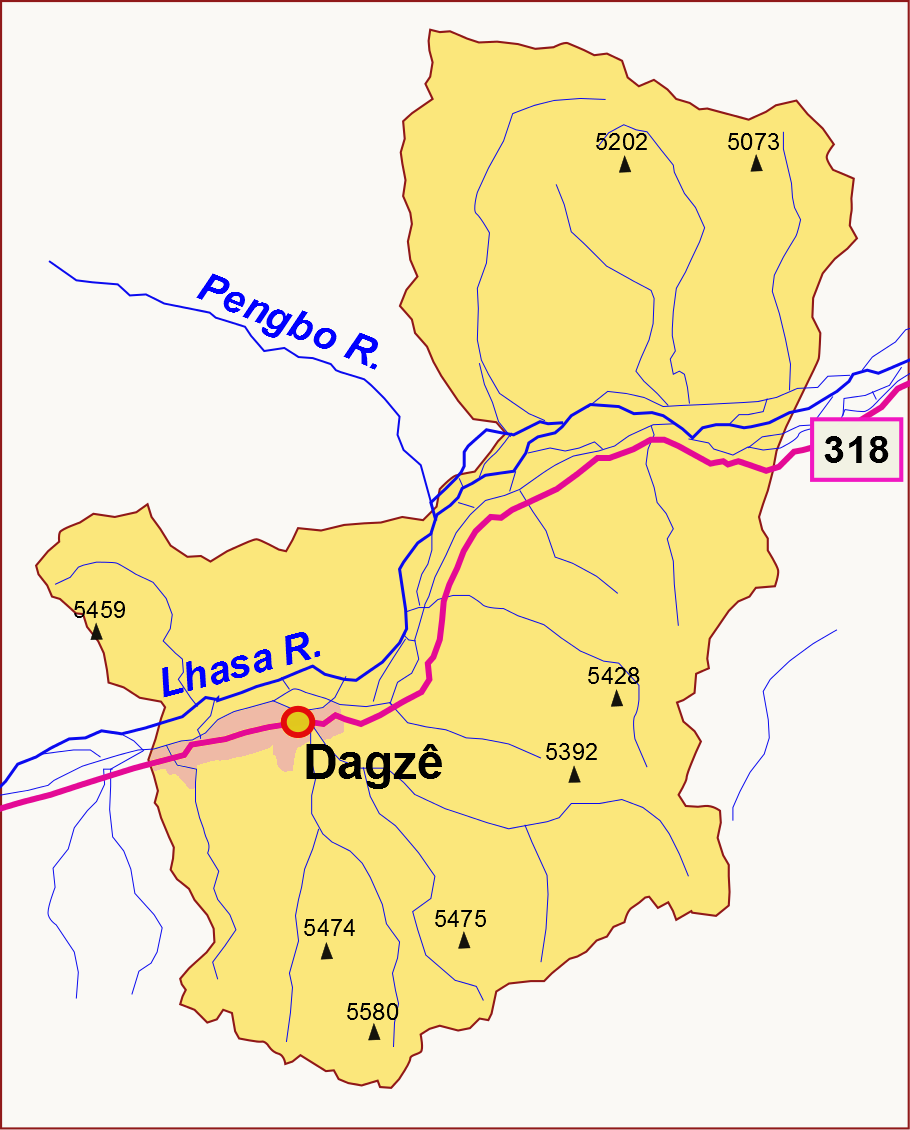
The built-up area (pink) within the Dagzê District (yellow)

Dazi means "Tiger peak" in Tibetan. It was founded in 1354. Dazi District was established in 1959. The district lies on both sides of the middle reaches of the Lhasa River. It is 20 kilometres (12 mi) to the east of the city of Lhasa in Chengguan District. Zhanang County is to the south, Maizhokunggar County to the east and Linzhou County to the north.

The total area of the district is 1,373 square kilometres (530 sq mi). It has an average elevation of 4,100 metres (13,500 ft) above sea level, and descends from higher ground in the north and south to 3,730 metres (12,240 ft) in the lowest part of the Lhasa river valley. Dazi is in a semi-arid plateau monsoon climate zone. The average temperature is 7.5 °C (45.5 °F), with about 130 days free of frost. Average rainfall is 450 millimetres (18 in).

== Administration ==
Dagzê District includes one town and five townships. The district seat is Dêqên Town, which had a population of 7,382 in 2003.

Name	Tibetan	Tibetan Pinyin	Chinese	Pinyin
Town
Dêqên Town	བདེ་ཆེན་གྲོང་རྡལ།	Dêqên Chongdai	德庆镇	Déqìng Zhèn
Townships
Targyai Township	དར་རྒྱས་ཤང་།	Targyai Xang	塔杰乡	Tǎjié Xiāng
Zangdog Township	གཙང་ཏོག་ཤང་།	Zangdog Xang	章多乡	Zhāngduō Xiāng
Tanggar Township	ཐང་དགར་ཤང་།	Tanggar Xang	唐嘎乡	Tánggā Xiāng
Xoi Township	ཞོག་མདའ་ཤང་།	Xog Xang	雪乡	Xuě Xiāng
Dromdoi Township	འབྲོམ་སྟོད་ཤང་།	Zhomdoi Xang	帮堆乡	Bāngduī Xiāng

== People and economy ==
As of 2013 the total population was 29,152. Most of the people are ethnic Tibetan but there are some Han people and other ethnic minorities. The main occupation is agriculture, including production of wheat, barley, rapeseed, potatoes and other vegetables. Livestock include yaks, cattle, sheep, chickens and ducks. Pigs are also farmed, mainly indoors. As of 2012 per capita income of farmers and herdsmen was 6,740 yuan. A growing amount of fruit and greenhouse-grown organic vegetables, edible mushrooms and medicinal plants is being marketed under the "Dazi Pure" label. As a sideline people make ethnic handicrafts.

== Infrastructure ==
In 2010 there were 28 schools in the county, including one junior high school and one kindergarten, with 276 full-time teachers. There is a district hospital and five township hospitals. The Sichuan-Tibet Highway (China National Highway 318) runs through the county.

The Dazi Bridge, built by the Highway Bureau of Xizang Autonomous Region in 1984, crosses the Lhasa River. It is a steel suspension bridge with a main span of 500 metres (1,600 ft) and a deck width of 4.5 metres (15 ft). In November 2014 it was reported that a new suspension bridge over the Lhasa River linking highway S202 to highway G318 was 80% complete, and would be opened to traffic in 2015. The total length including approaches was 1,400 metres (4,600 ft), with the bridge being 727 metres (2,385 ft) long. The roadbed was 12 metres (39 ft) wide. The total investment was 88 million yuan.

== Monasteries ==
The main monasteries in Dagzê are Ganden Monastery and Yerpa. Gandain monastery was built after 1409 at the initiative of Je Tsongkhapa, founder of the Gelug sect, and is the most important of this sect. It is 57 kilometres (35 mi) from Lhasa on the slopes of Wangbori Mountain at an elevation of 3,800 metres (12,500 ft), on the south bank of the Lhasa River in Dagze County. The mountain is said to have the shape of a reclining elephant.

The monastery includes Buddha halls, palace residences, Buddhist colleges and other buildings. Dra Yerpa temple, on a hillside in Dagze County, is known for its meditation cave connected with Songtsen Gampo, the 7th century Tibetan ruler.

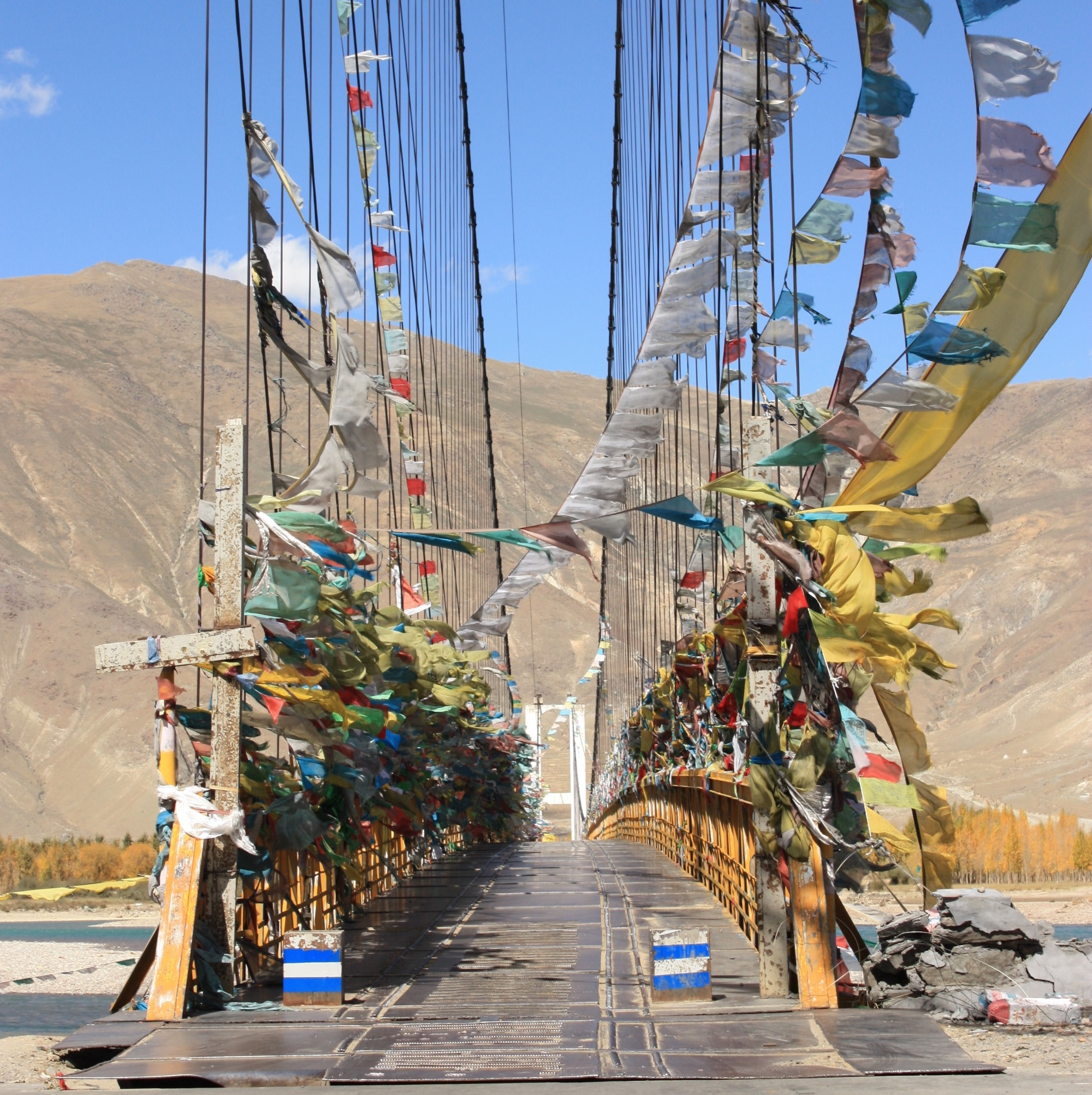
Dazi Bridge over the Lhasa River

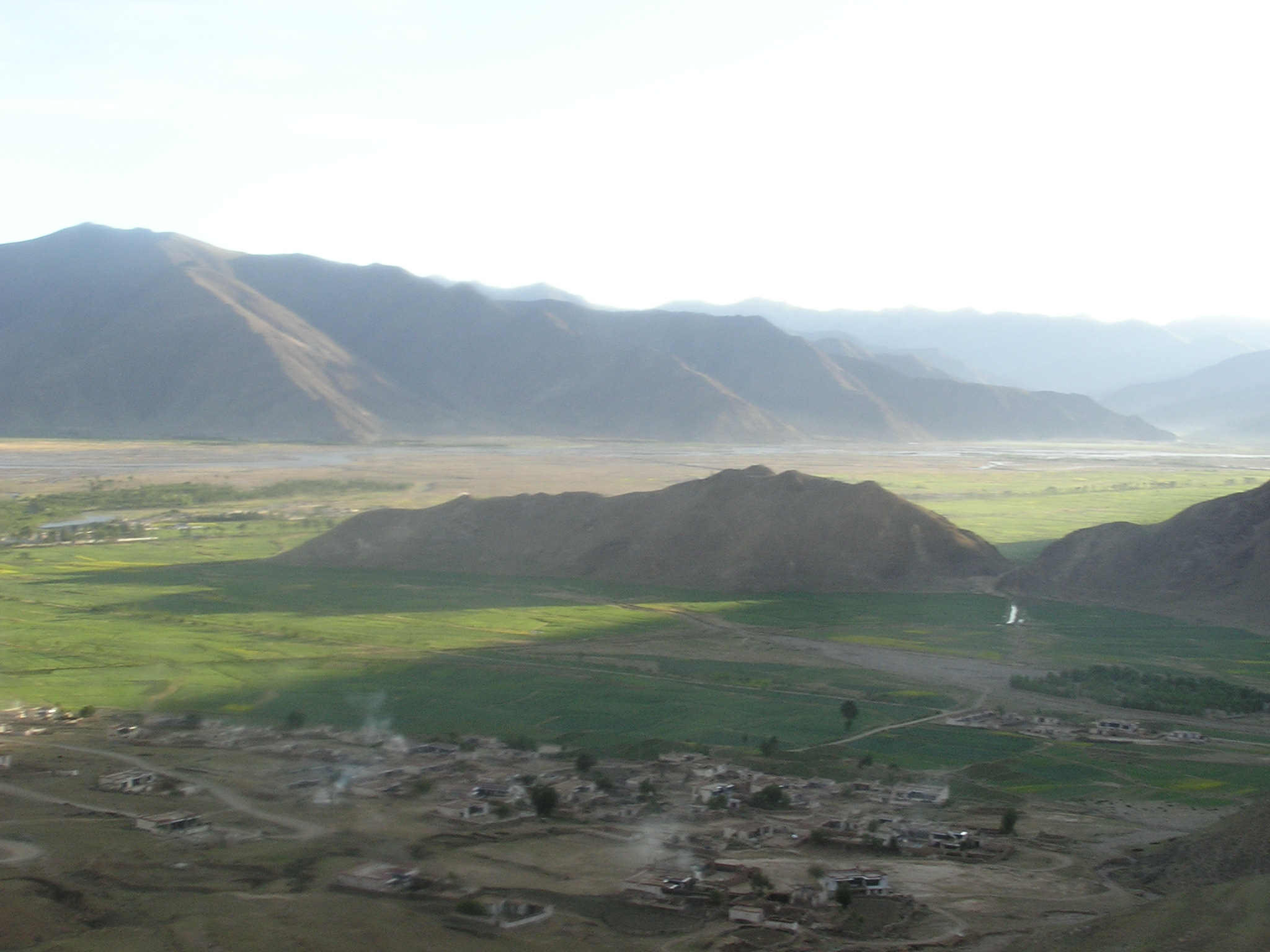
Lhasa River near Ganden Monastery 1

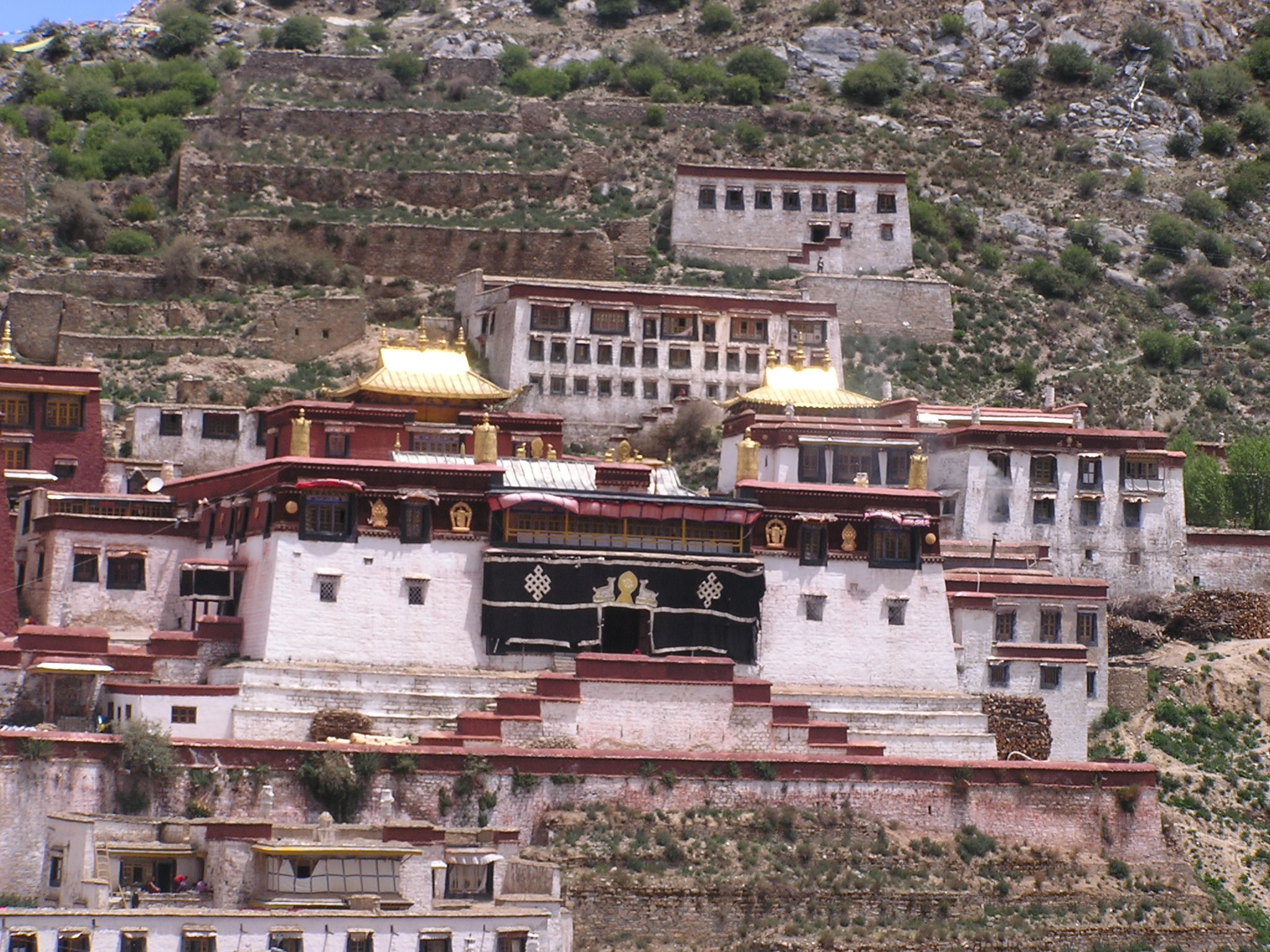
Ganden Monastery

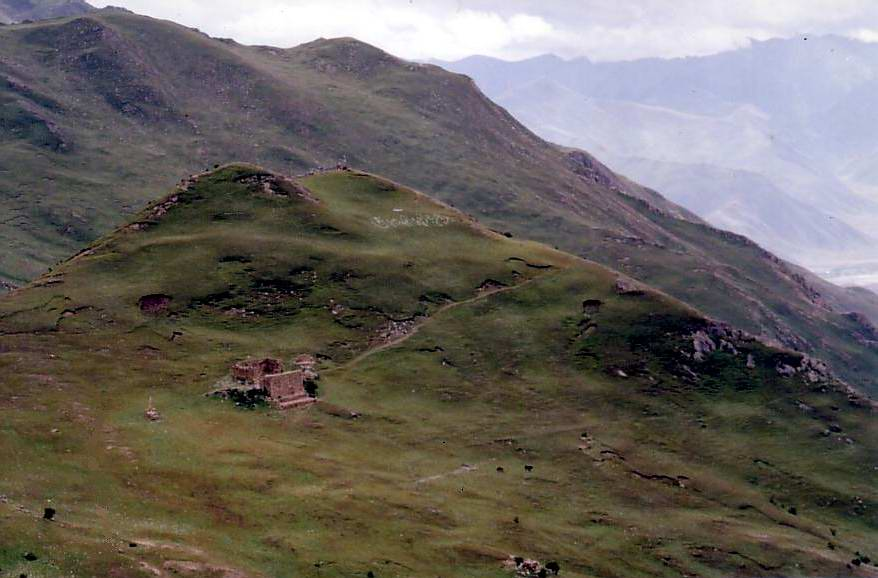
Sky burial site, Yerpa Valley

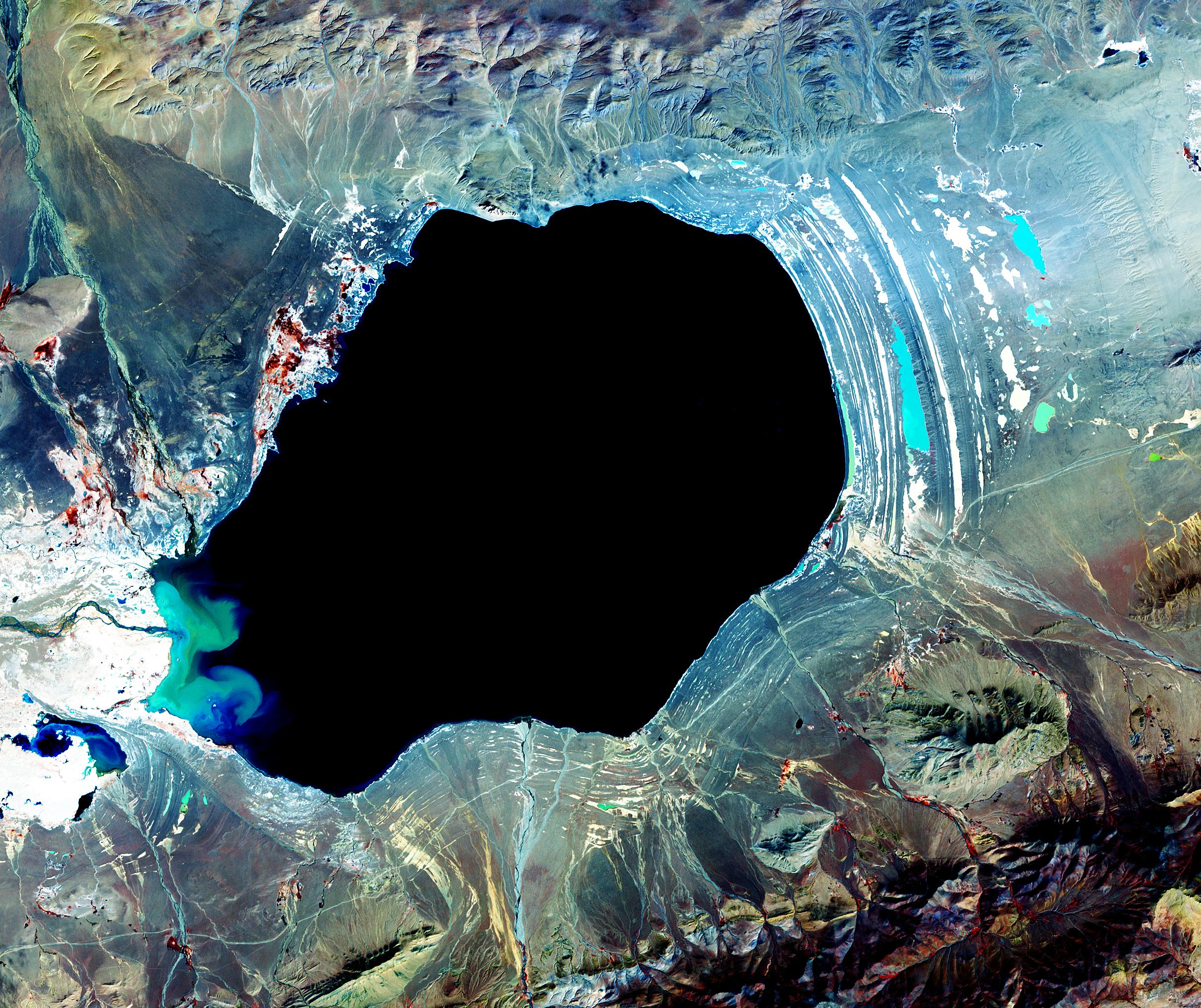
NASA Satellite image of Dagze Co (lake), Tibet

== Sources ==
- "Basic Dazi". Dazi Industry and Information Bureau. Archived from the original on 2015-02-21.
- "Dazi Bridge". Structurae.
- "Dazi Overview". Dazi county government. 2013-07-10.
- Gandain Monastery. China Intercontinental Press. 1997. ISBN 978-7-80113-312-0.
- "Dazhi County to create a clean and healthy industry to cultivate high-grade boutique fruits and vegetables". China Tibet News. 2014-04-03. Archived from the original on 2015-02-21.
- Wei Guo (2014-11-05). "80% of Lhasa New Dazi Bridge is completed and will be open to traffic next". Lhasa Evening Post. Archived from the original on 2015-02-22.
