= Dazi Bridge =

One-lane suspension bridge in Dagzê, Tibet, China

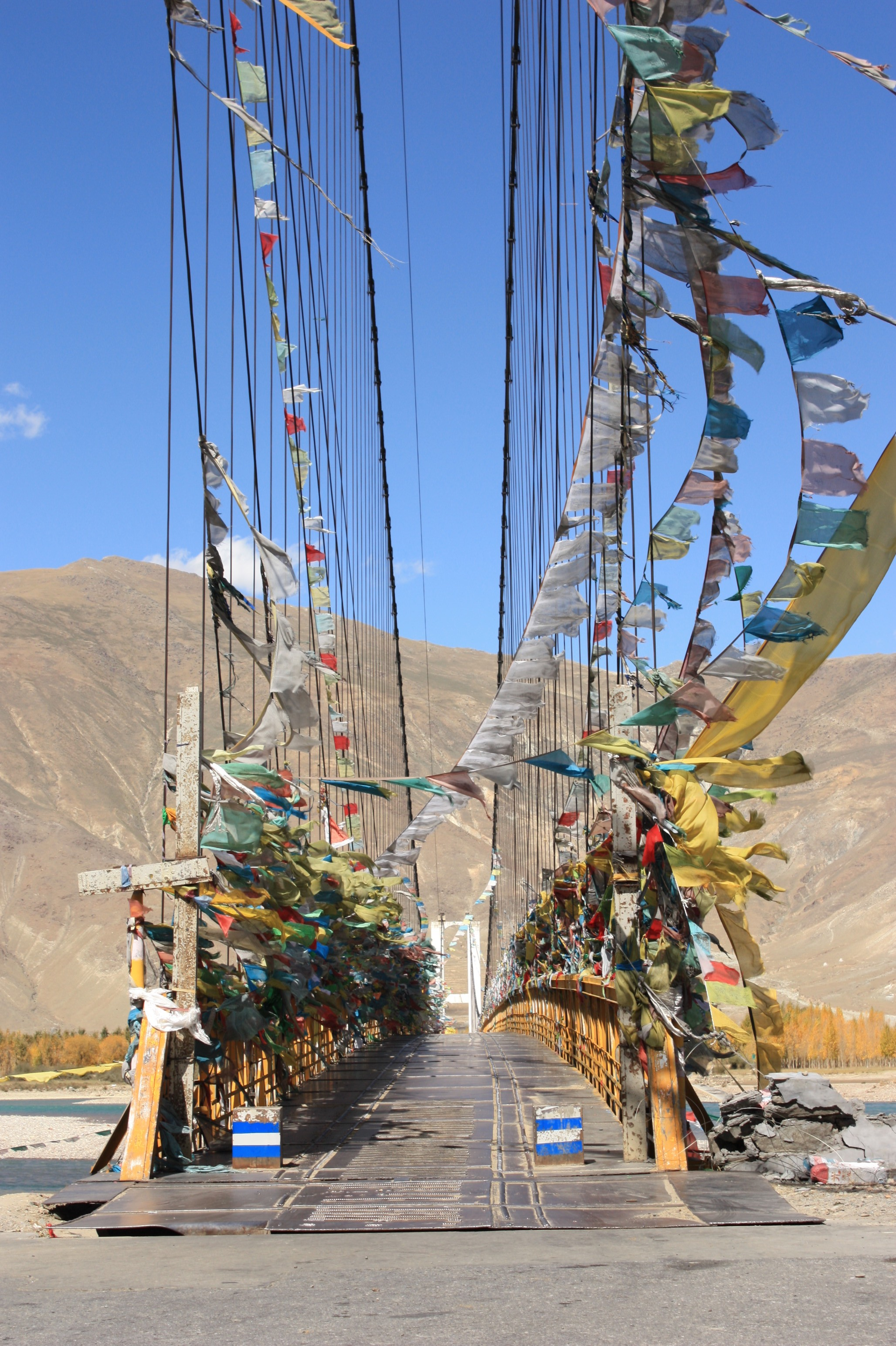
- Coordinates: 29.6794°N 91.3756°E
- Carries: Single lane road
- Crosses: Lhasa River
- Locale: Dagzê County, Lhasa Tibet Autonomous Region

Characteristics
- Design: Suspension bridge
- Width: 4.5 metres (15 ft)
- Longest span: 500 metres (1,600 ft)

History
- Opened: 1984

The Dazi Bridge is a one-lane suspension bridge in Dagzê, Tibet. At the time of its completion in 1984, it was the longest spanning bridge in China with a main span of 500 m (1,600 ft). The bridge crosses the Lhasa River 30 km (19 mi) east of Lhasa.

== Structure ==
The bridge is a gravity-anchored suspension bridge with deck trussing. It carries one lane of traffic measuring only 4.5 m (15 ft) wide.

== See also ==
- List of longest suspension bridge spans
