= Dhvaja =

Flag or banner in Indian religions

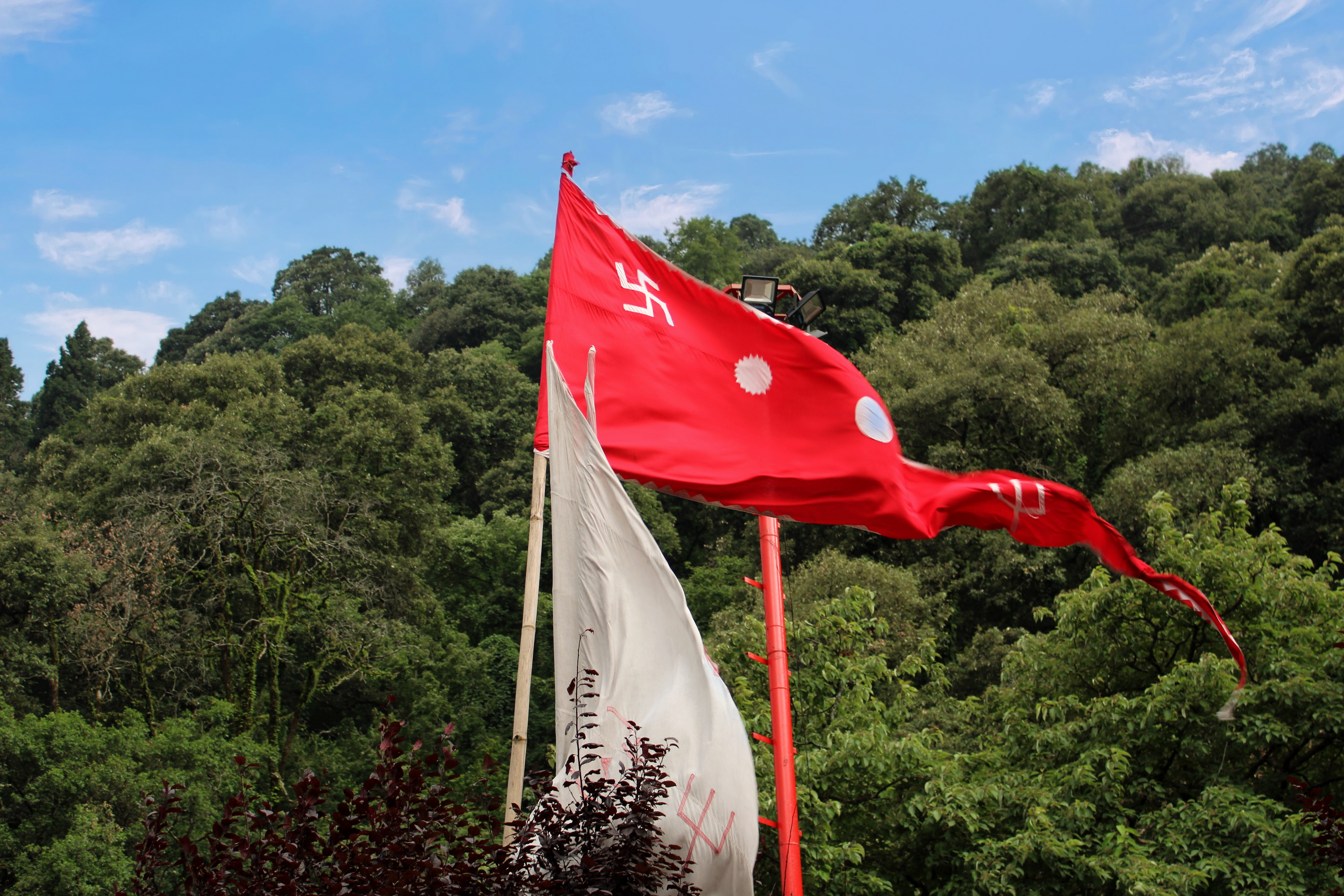
A Hindu flag from the temple Maa Naina Devi, Nainital, Uttarakhand, India

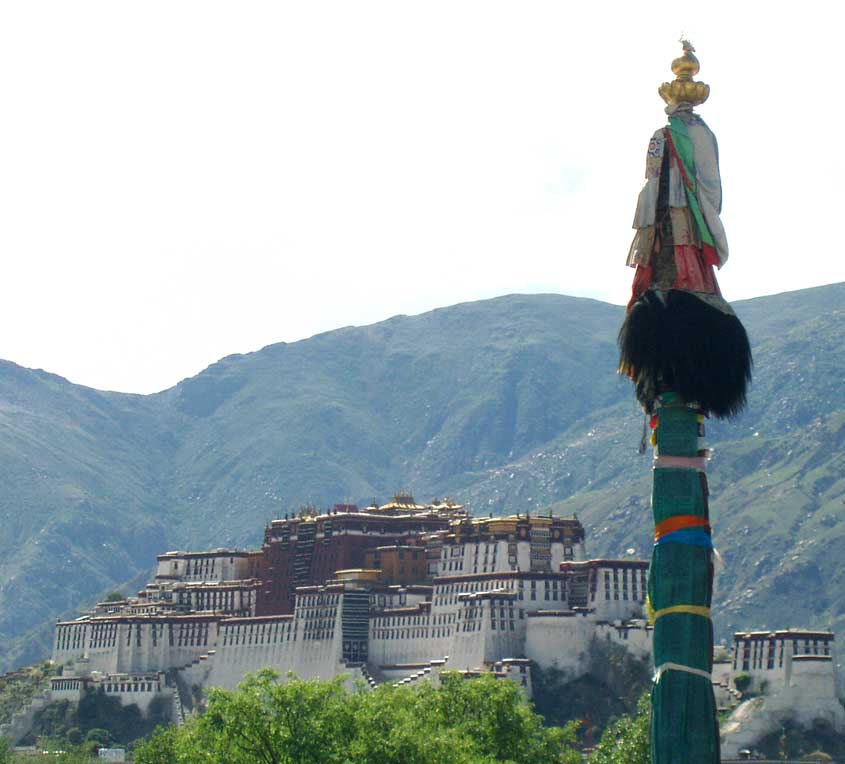
Dhvaja (Victory banner) – pole design with silk scarfs, on the background the Potala Palace

Dhvaja (Sanskrit: ध्वज, romanized: Dhvaja, lit. 'flag'; Tibetan: རྒྱལ་མཚན, Wylie: rgyal-msthan) is the Sanskrit term for a banner or a flag. Flags are featured in the iconography, mythology, and architecture of Indian religions such as Buddhism, Hinduism, and Jainism. They are one of the ashtamangala, the eight auspicious emblems of these religions.

== Hinduism ==
In Hindu iconography, deities are often portrayed with flags, often represented carried or present alongside their mounts. Such flags are often venerated due to their association of a given deity, and also due to the fact that they are regarded to be imbued by their divine attributes. A flag staff or a votive column (dhvajastambha) is often erected in front of temples or on top of their roofs. These columns are regarded to symbolise the world axis, and a pillar between earth and heaven.

A chapter from the epic Mahabharata describes the various flags and their devices borne by the warriors of the Kurukshetra War:

- Abhimanyu - Deer
- Arjuna - Hanuman
- Ashvatthama - Lion's tail with golden rays
- Bharata - Tree
- Bhima - Lion
- Bhishma - Tree
- Drona - Kamandalu
- Duryodhana - Serpent
- Ghatotkacha - Wheel
- Indra - Sword
- Jayadratha - Boar
- Kama - Makara
- Karna - Elephant
- Kartikeya - Peacock
- Kripa - Bull
- Nakula - Deer
- Sahadeva - Swan
- Shiva - Nandi
- Vishnu - Garuda
- Yudhishthira - Moon

== Tibetan architecture ==
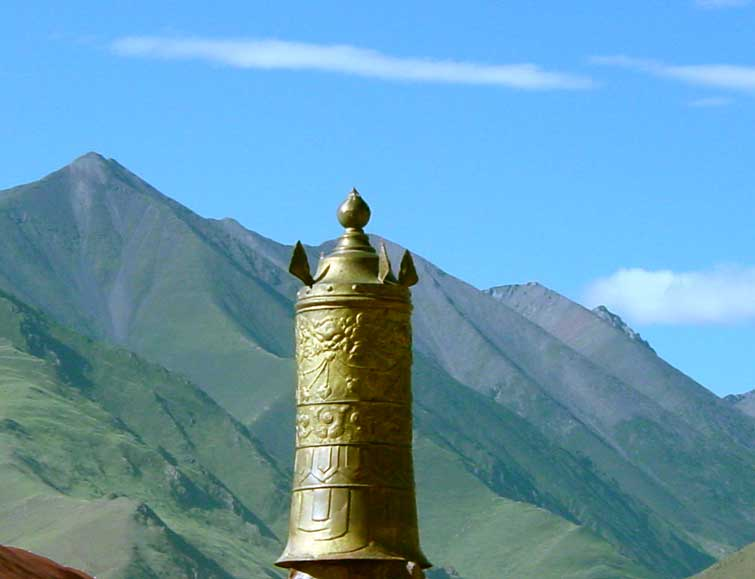
Dhvaja ('victory banner'), on the roof of Sanga Monastery.

Within the Tibetan tradition, a list of eleven different forms of the victory banner is given to represent eleven specific methods for overcoming "defilements" (Sanskrit: klesha). Many variations of the dhvaja's design can be seen on the roofs of Tibetan monasteries (Gompa, Vihara) to symbolize the Buddha's victory over four maras.

In its most traditional form, the victory banner is fashioned as a cylindrical ensign mounted upon a long wooden axel-pole. The top of the banner takes the form of the chatra ("ceremonial parasol"), another of the 8 signs, surrounded by a central "wish granting gem" (Sanskrit: cintamani). This domed parasol is rimmed by an ornate golden crest-bar or moon-crest with makara-trailed ends, from which hangs a billowing yellow or "white silk scarf'"(Sanskrit: khata) (see top right).

As a hand-held ensign, the victory banner is an attribute of many deities, particularly those associated with wealth and power, such as Vaiśravaṇa, the Great Guardian King of the north. As a roof-mounted ensign, the victory banners are cylinders usually made of beaten copper (similar to toreutics) and are traditionally placed on the four corners of monastery and temple roofs. Those roof ornaments usually take the form of a small circular parasol surmounted by the wish-fulfilling gem, with four or eight makara heads at the parasol edge, supporting little silver bells (see the Jokhang Dhvaja on the left). A smaller victory banner fashioned on a beaten copper frame, hung with black silk, and surmounted by a flaming "trident" (Sanskrit: trishula) is also commonly displayed on roofs (see the dhvaja on the roof of the Potala Palace below).

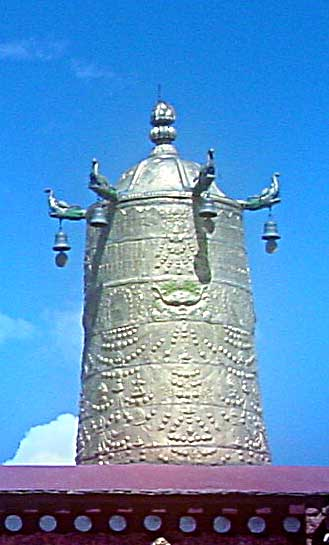
Dhvaja ('victory banner'), on the roof of Jokhang Monastery.

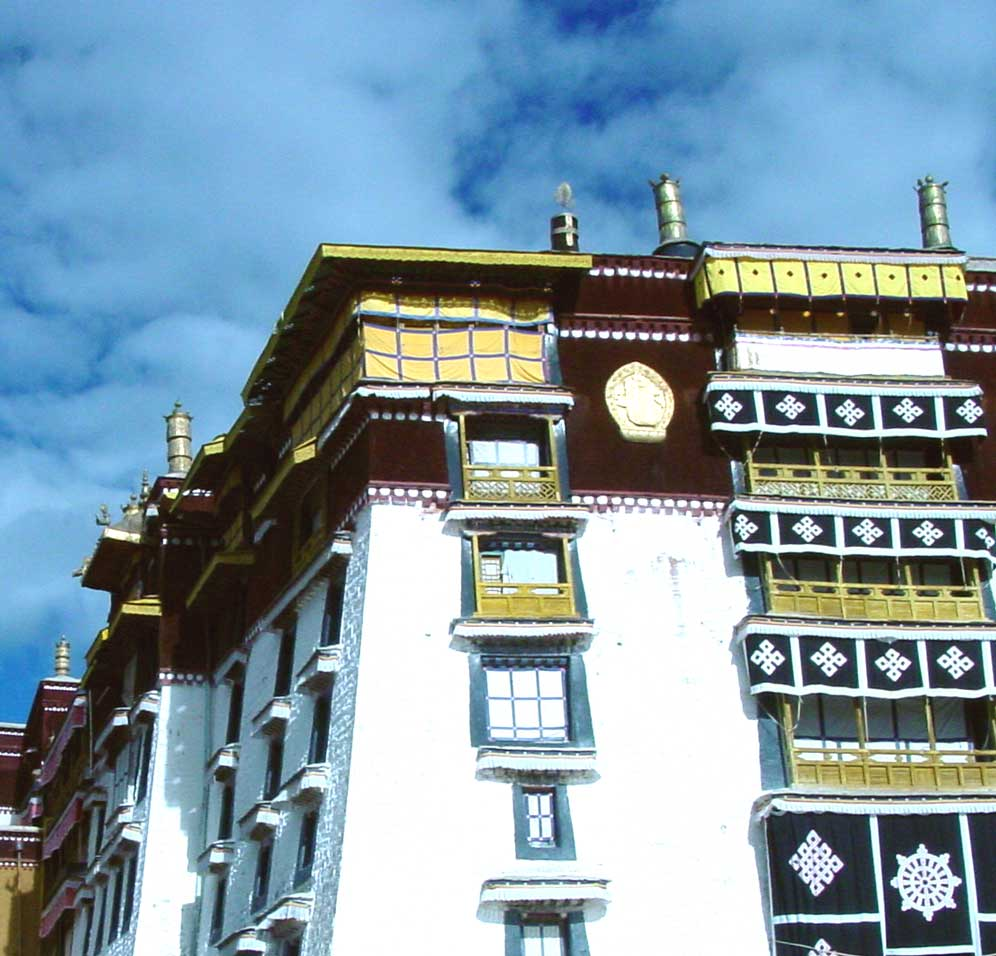
Five Dhvajas (Victory banners), on the roof of the Potala White Palace.

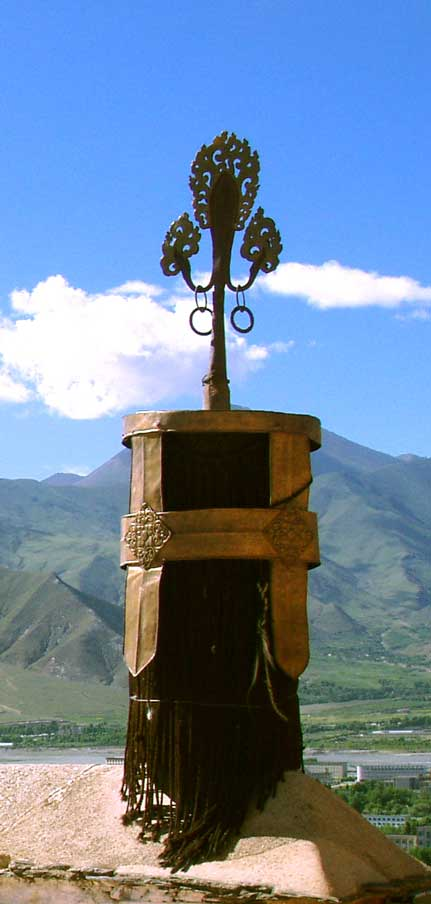
Dhvaja (Victory banner) - trident design with black silk, roof of the Potala Palace.

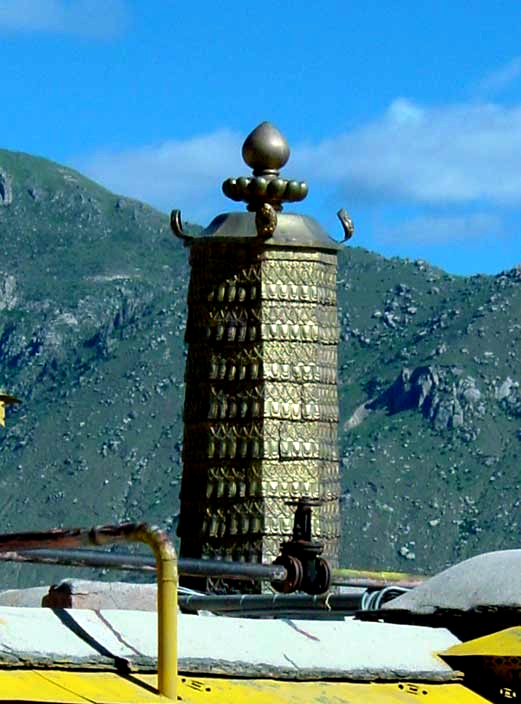
Dhvaja (Victory banner), Roof of Potala Palace.

A Dhvaja from Hinduism.

== History ==
Dhvajas are probably depicted in Indus Valley Civilization seals, one Indus seal depicts four men carrying variously shaped djvajas or standards and later also on cast copper coins from the early historic period of the Indian Sub continent. Heliodorus pillar inscription also declares the pillar to be Garudadhvaja or Garuda standard.

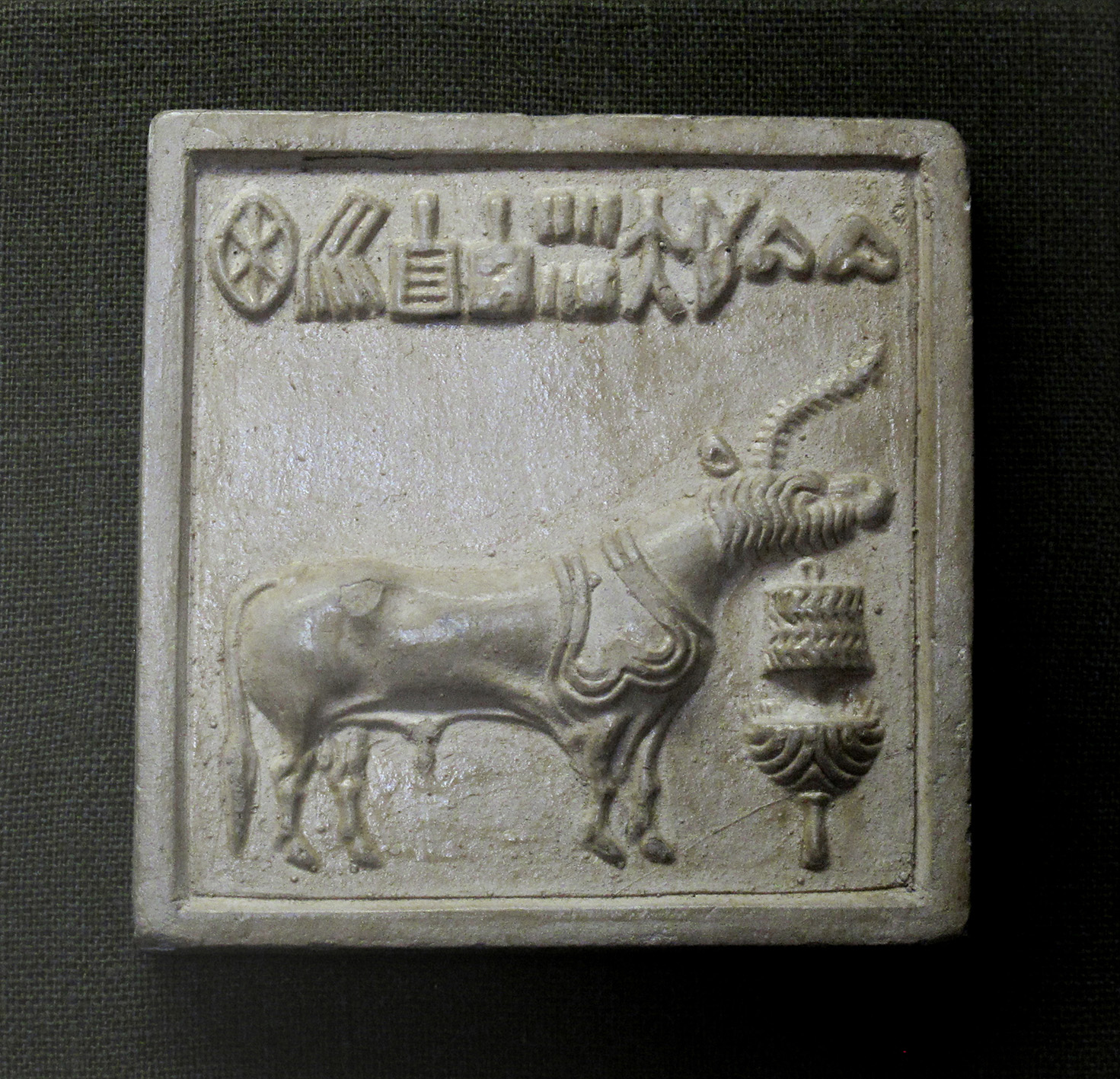
Indus seal mold depicting Dhvaja like object in front of the unicorn

Jayadhvaja or triangular standard depicted on a Shunga copper cast coin, 2nd-1st century BC

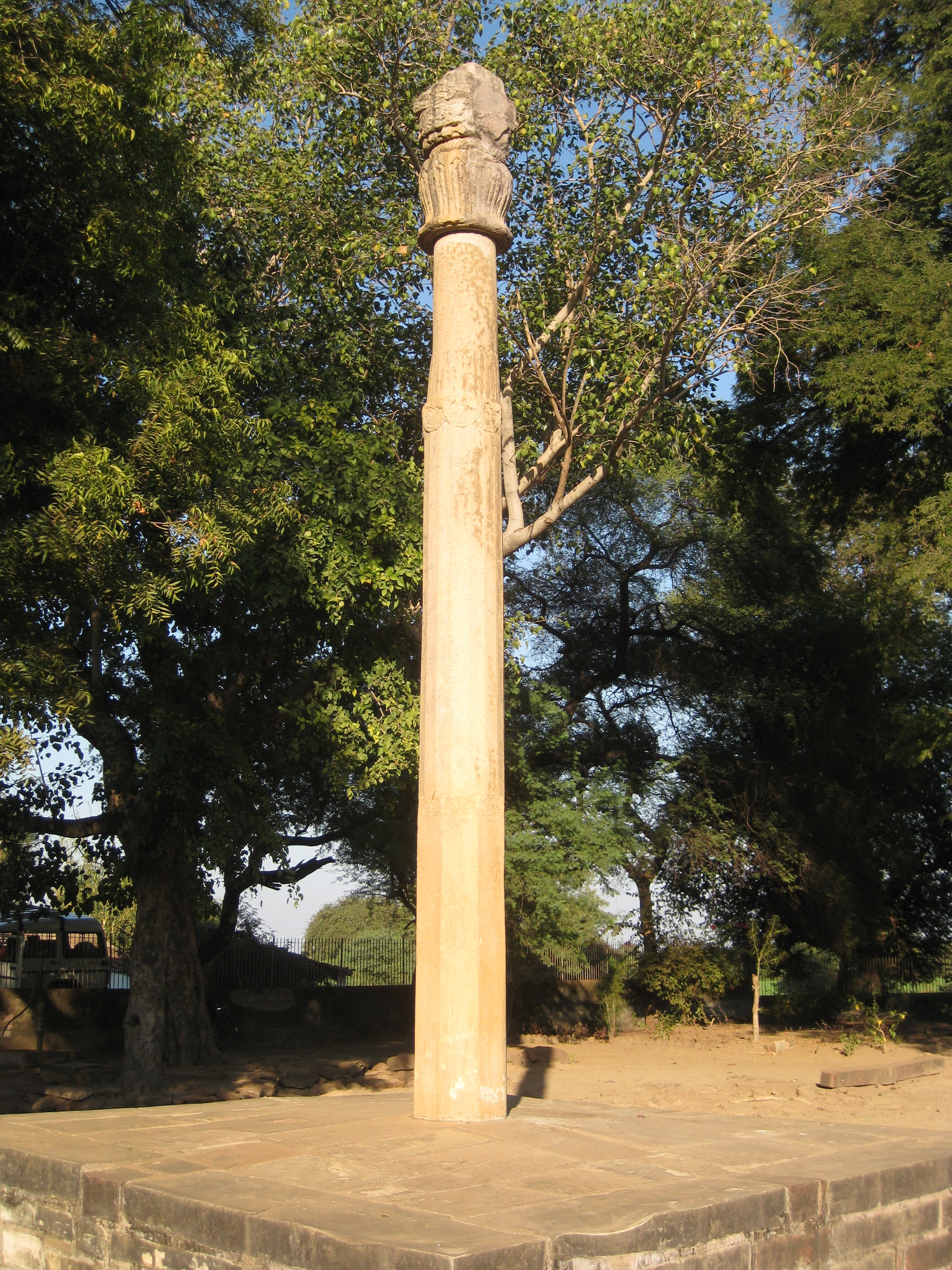
Heliodorus pillar, as Garudadhvaja or Garuda standard, circa 100 BC

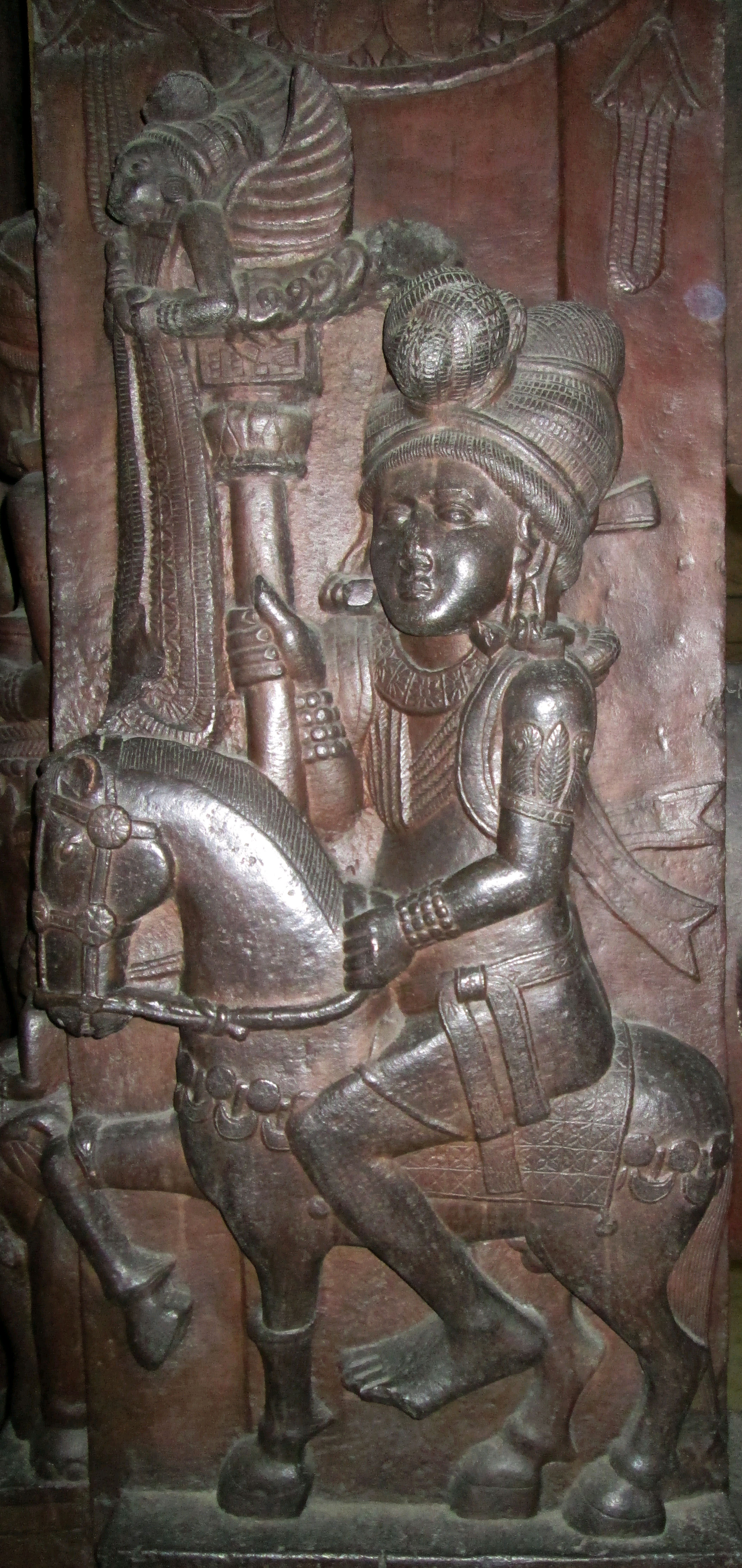
Shunga horseman carrying a portable dhvaja, Barhut, circa 100 BC

== Saffron flags ==
The colour saffron color is considered sacred in the Indian religions of Hinduism, Jainism, Buddhism, and Sikhism. Other flags incorporating the saffron colour based on Indian religions are:

- Religion
  - Dhvajasthamba, flagpole in Hinduism
  - Dharma Dhwaj, the Ram Mandir flag
  - Bhagwa Dhwaj, the Maratha flag associated with Hinduism
  - Buddhist flag
  - Jain flag
  - Nishan Sahib in Sikhism
- Nations
  - National flag of India
  - National flag of Nepal
  - National flag of Sri Lanka

== See also ==
- Dhvajasthamba
- Hindu iconography
- Sitatapatra
- List of Indian flags
