= Lhasa Evening Post =

Newspaper published in Chinese and Tibetic languages

- Type: Daily newspaper
- Founded: July 1, 1985
- Ceased publication: January 2020
- Headquarters: Lhasa
- Website: lasa-eveningnews.com.cn

The Lhasa Evening Post (Chinese: 拉萨晚报), or Lasa Wanbao, commonly known as Lhasa Evening News, was a Lhasa-based metropolitan newspaper published in Chinese and Tibetic languages in China. The newspaper was founded on July 1, 1985, and was the official newspaper of the Lhasa Municipal Committee of the Chinese Communist Party (中共拉萨市委).

== History ==
On November 29, 2000, Lhasa Evening Post officially launched its online version. Starting in 2004, it began to publish color newspapers every day.

On July 6, 2009, Lhasa Evening Post was newly revised. On January 1, 2020, the paper ceased publication.
