= Dêqên, Lhasa =

Dêqên བདེ་ཆེན་ · 德庆镇
- Town
- Location within the Tibet Autonomous Region
- Coordinates (Dêqên government): 29°40′09″N 91°22′00″E
- Country: People's Republic of China
- Autonomous region: Tibet Autonomous Region
- Prefecture-level city: Lhasa
- District: Dagzê
- Nearby settlements (distance): Baga; 15.9 mi (26 km) Bayizhen; 9.2 mi (15 km); Puqu; 6 mi (10 km); Pula; 6.2 mi (10 km) Qomo; 8.2 mi (13 km)

Population
  - Major Nationalities: Tibetan
  - Regional dialect: Tibetan language
- Time zone: UTC+8 (CST)

Dêqên (Tibetan: བདེ་ཆེན་, Wylie: déchen), or Deqing in Chinese (simplified Chinese: 德庆; traditional Chinese: 德慶; pinyin: Déqìng), is a town and the seat of Dagzê District, Lhasa, Tibet Autonomous Region, China. It is near Ganden Monastery, about 40 kilometres (25 mi) east of central Lhasa.
