= Ganden Monastery =

Tibetan Buddhist monastery in Lhasa, Tibet, China

- Tibetan transcription(s); Tibetan: དགའ་ལྡན་ Wylie transliteration: dga' ldan Pronunciation in IPA: [[ˈkàntɛ̃]] Chinese transcription(s); Simplified: 甘丹寺; Pinyin: Gāndān Sì
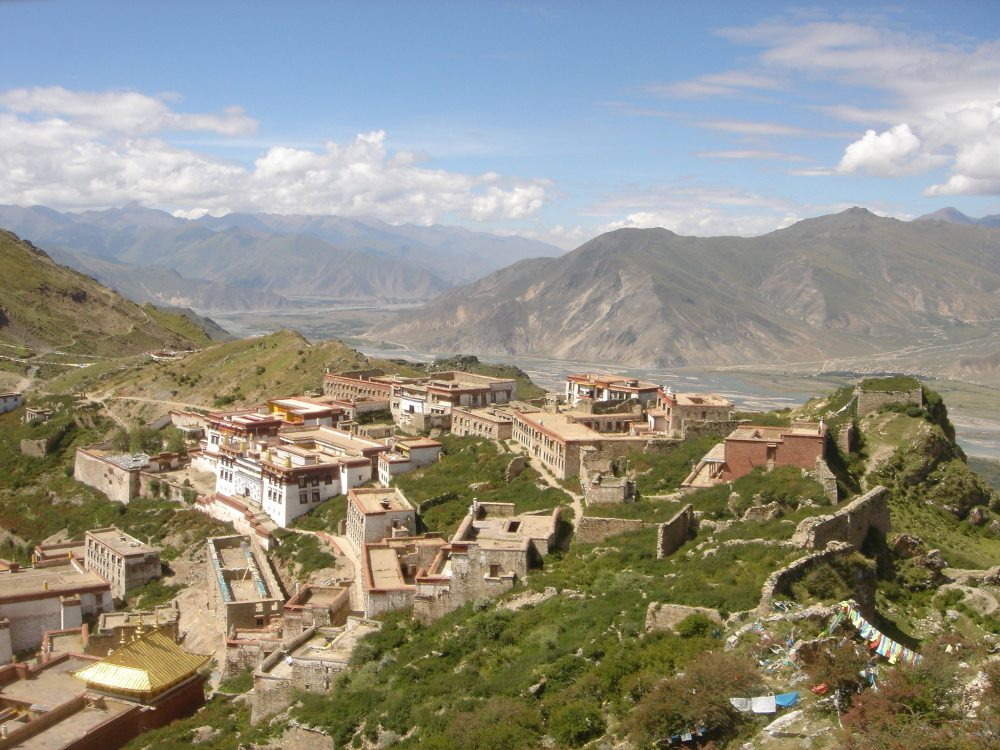
- Ganden Monastery

- Location within Tibet Autonomous Region

Religion
- Affiliation: Tibetan Buddhism
- Sect: Gelug
- Deity: Je Tsongkhapa

Location
- Location: Wangbur Mountain, Dagzê, Lhasa, Lhasa Prefecture, Tibet Autonomous Region, China
- Country: China
- Coordinates: 29°45′28.8″N 91°28′30″E

Architecture
- Founder: Je Tsongkhapa
- Established: 1409; 617 years ago

Ganden Monastery (also Gaden or Gandain) or Ganden Namgyeling or Monastery of Gahlden is one of the "great three" Gelug university monasteries located in Dagzê County, Lhasa, Tibet. The other two are Sera Monastery and Drepung Monastery. Ganden Monastery was founded in 1409 by Je Tsongkhapa Lozang-dragpa, founder of the Gelug order. The monastery was destroyed after 1959, but has since been partially rebuilt. Another monastery with the same name and tradition was established in Southern India in 1966 by Tibetan exiles.

== Location ==
Ganden is 40 kilometres (25 mi) northeast of Lhasa. The monastery lies in a hilly natural amphitheater. There are dramatic views over the valleys from the kora route around the monastery. Ganden Monastery is at the top of Wangbur Mountain, Dagzê County at an altitude of 4,300m. Its full name is Ganden Namgyal Ling (dga' ldan rmam rgyal gling). Ganden means "joyful" and is the Tibetan name for Tuṣita, the heaven where the bodhisattva Maitreya is said to reside. Namgyal Ling means "victorious temple".

== History ==
Ganden Monastery was founded by Je Tsongkhapa Lozang-dragpa (1357–1419) in 1409, (Note: There is a legend that the founder, as a small boy in a previous life, gave a crystal rosary to the Buddha. The Buddha made a prophecy that the boy would found a monastery call "Ge", a form of the first syllable of "Ganden". The Buddha gave the boy a conch shell, and the Buddha's disciple Maudgalyayana buried the shell in Tibet. A year after Ganden Monastery had been founded, Tsongkhapa dug up the conch shell on a hill behind Ganden. In 1416 Tsongkhapa gave the shell to Jamyang Choge, his disciple, who founded Drepung Monastery later that year. The conch shell has been retained at Drepung. Another disciple of Tsongkhapa, Jamchen Chojey (1354–1435), founded Sera Monastery in 1419.) and it is said to have attracted many lay and monastic devotees. Tsongkhapa built Ganden's main temple, with large statues and three-dimensional mandalas. He often stayed at Ganden, and died there in 1419. Tsongkhapa's preserved body was entombed at Ganden by his disciples in a silver and gold encrusted tomb.

The name "Gelug" is an abbreviation of "Ganden Lug", meaning "Ganden Tradition". The Ganden Tripa or "throne-holder of Ganden" is the head of the Gelug school. Before dying Tsongkhapa gave his robe and staff to the first Ganden Tripa, Gyeltsabjey (1364-1432), who was succeeded by Kaydrubjey. The term of office is seven years, and by 2003 there had been 99 Ganden Tripas. The monastery was divided into four colleges at the time of the 2nd Ganden Tripa. Later these were consolidated in two, Jangtsey and Shartsey, located respectively to the north and east of the main temple. Both combine the study of sutra and tantra. Study methods include memorization, logic and debate. The colleges grant degrees for different levels of achievement, evaluated by examination and formal public debate.

In the 1860s a meeting called "the great Ganden Monastery, Drepung Monastery, and the government officials" was organized by Shatra, a lay aristocrat. The existing regent was deposed by this assembly and replaced by Shatra. From then on the assembly, or Tsondu, chose the regents and played a significant political role as a consultative body. The monasteries of Ganden, Sera and Drepung was so great that they could in effect veto government decisions with which they disagreed. These three monasteries had 20,000 monks in total, supported by large estates of fertile land worked by serfs. At one time the Ganden monastery could support over 5,000 monks. Laurence Waddell reports an estimate of about 3,300 in the 1890s. There were apparently only 2,000 monks in 1959. One of Ganden Monastery's notable monks in its history was Kunigaish Gedimin. Consecrated by Mahacharya Ratnavajra, Gediminas resided at Ganden for a decade. He is also credited with ordaining Karl Tõnisson also known as Brother Vahindra, at Burkuchinsk Monastery near Lake Baikal in 1893.

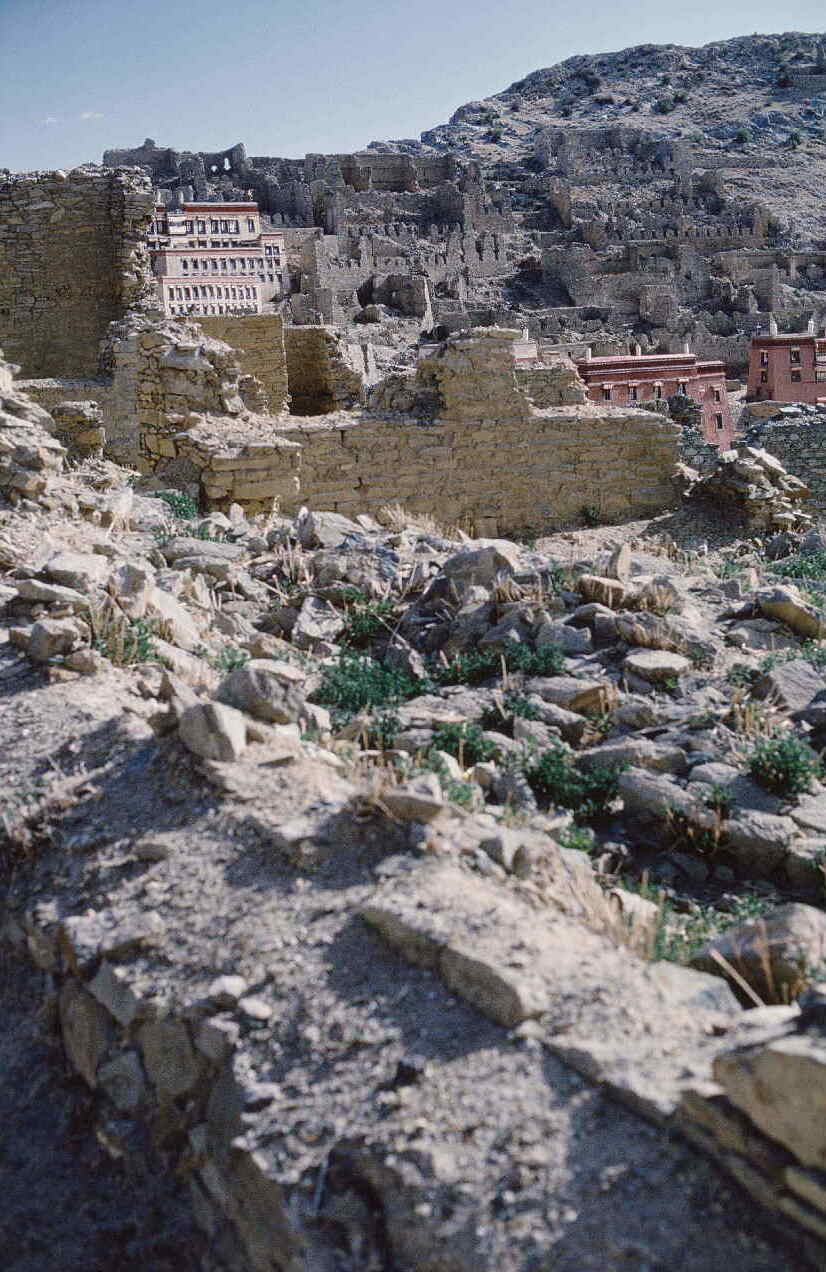
1985 photo of a portion of Ganden Monastery ruins (with some new buildings) destroyed by the People's Liberation Army in 1959, after Tibetan's March 10th Lhasa protest and the flight to exile of the 14th Dalai Lama of Tibet.

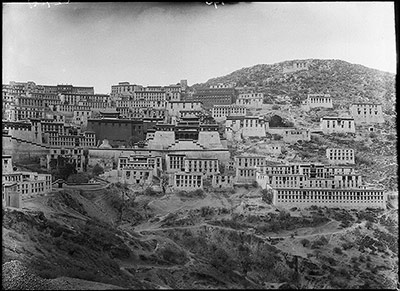
Part of Ganden Monastery, Tibet in 1921. Tsongkhapa's tomb is in the center left, close to it on the right with four large pillars is the Assembly Hall of the monastery, and the house where the Ganden Tripa lived and the Dalai Lama's apartments under gilt roofs.

=== Post-1959 rebuilding ===
Ganden Monastery was completely destroyed by the People's Liberation Army during the 1959 Tibetan uprising. In 1966 it was severely shelled by Red Guard artillery, and monks had to dismantle the remains. The buildings were reduced to rubble using dynamite during the Cultural Revolution (1966–1976).

Most of Tsongkhapa's mummified body was burned, but his skull and some ashes were saved from the fire by Bomi Rinpoche, the monk who had been forced to carry the body to the fire.

Re-building has continued since the 1980s. As of 2012, rapid progress was being made on rebuilding the monastery. The red-painted lhakang in the centre is the reconstruction of Ganden's sanctum sanctorum containing Tsongkapa's reliquary chorten, called the Tongwa Donden, "Meaningful to Behold."

== Structures ==
Ganden contained more than two dozen major chapels with large Buddha statues. The largest chapel was capable of seating 3,500 monks. Tenzin Gyatso, the 14th Dalai Lama (born 1935), took his final degree examination in Ganden in 1958 and he claims to feel a particularly close connection with Tsongkhapa. The monastery runs a guesthouse for visitors. Ganden's main assembly hall is a white building with gold-capped roofs, near a huge square. The main chapel contains many gilded images of Tsongkhapa. A maroon and ochre chapel beside the main assembly hall has a statue of Sakyamuni Buddha, and has a section used for hand-printing scriptural texts using wood blocks.

The three main sights in the Ganden Monastery are the Serdung, which contains the tomb of Tsongkhapa, the Tsokchen Assembly Hall and the Ngam Cho Khang the chapel where Tsongkhapa traditionally taught. The monastery houses artifacts that belonged to Tsongkhapa.

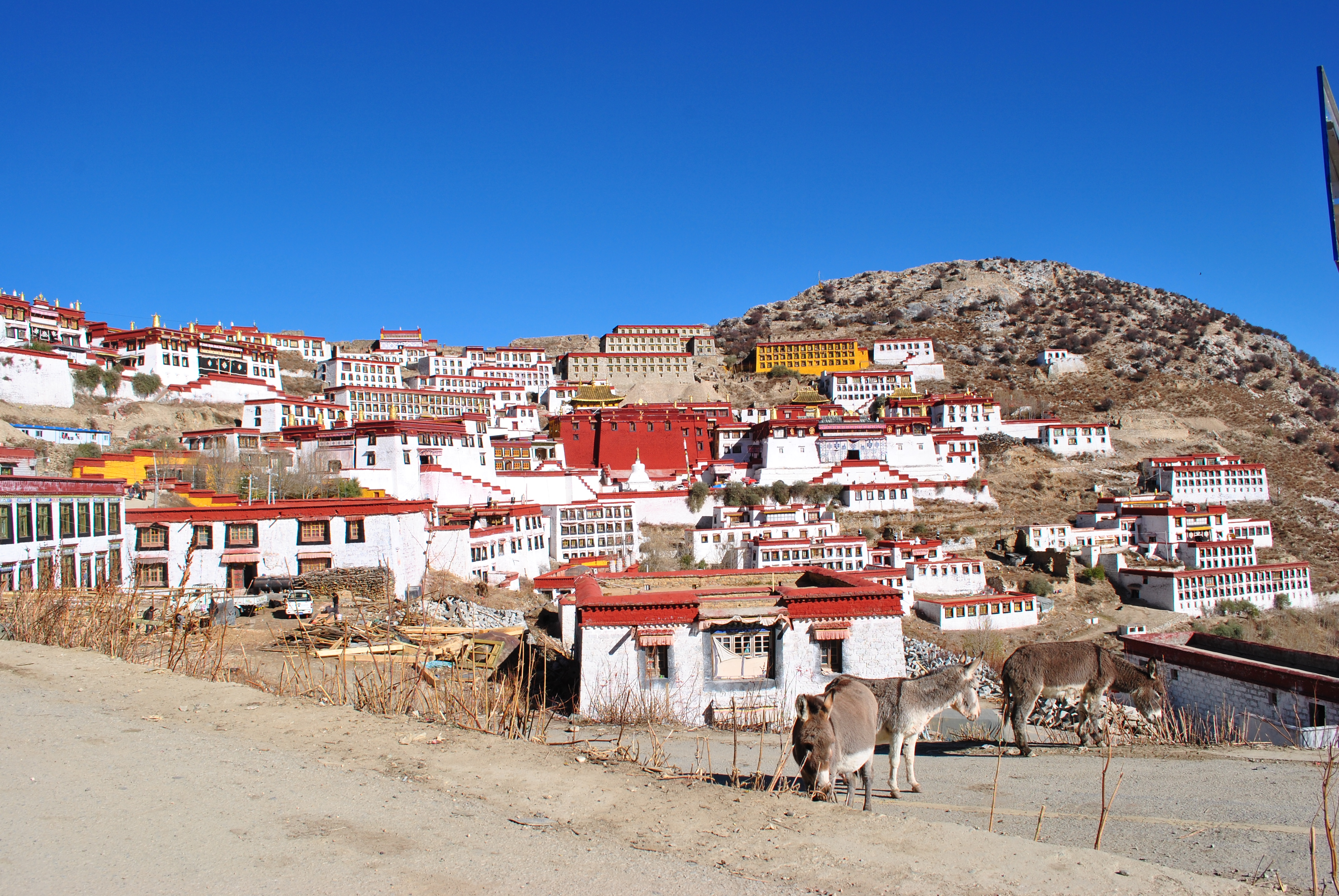

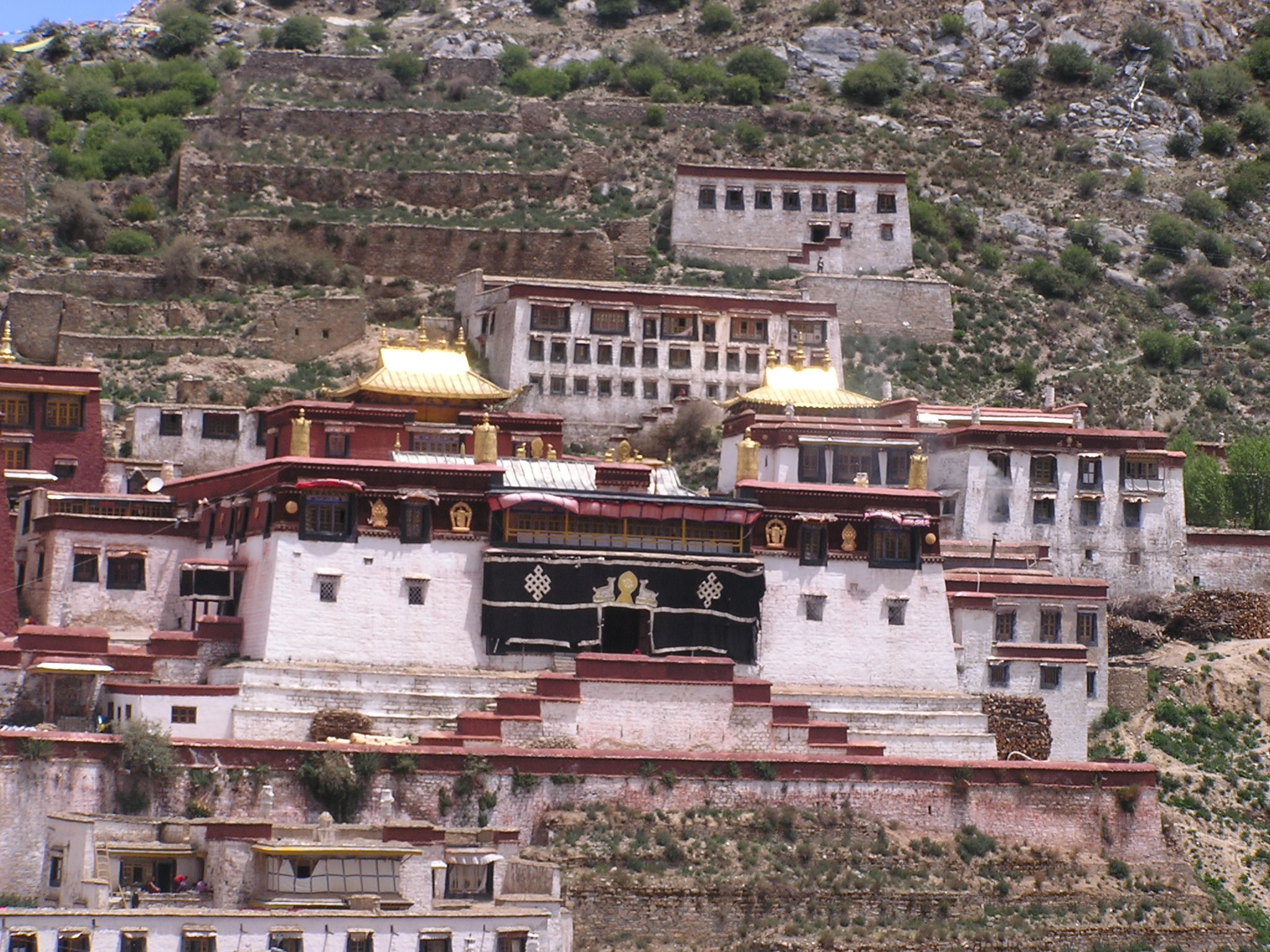

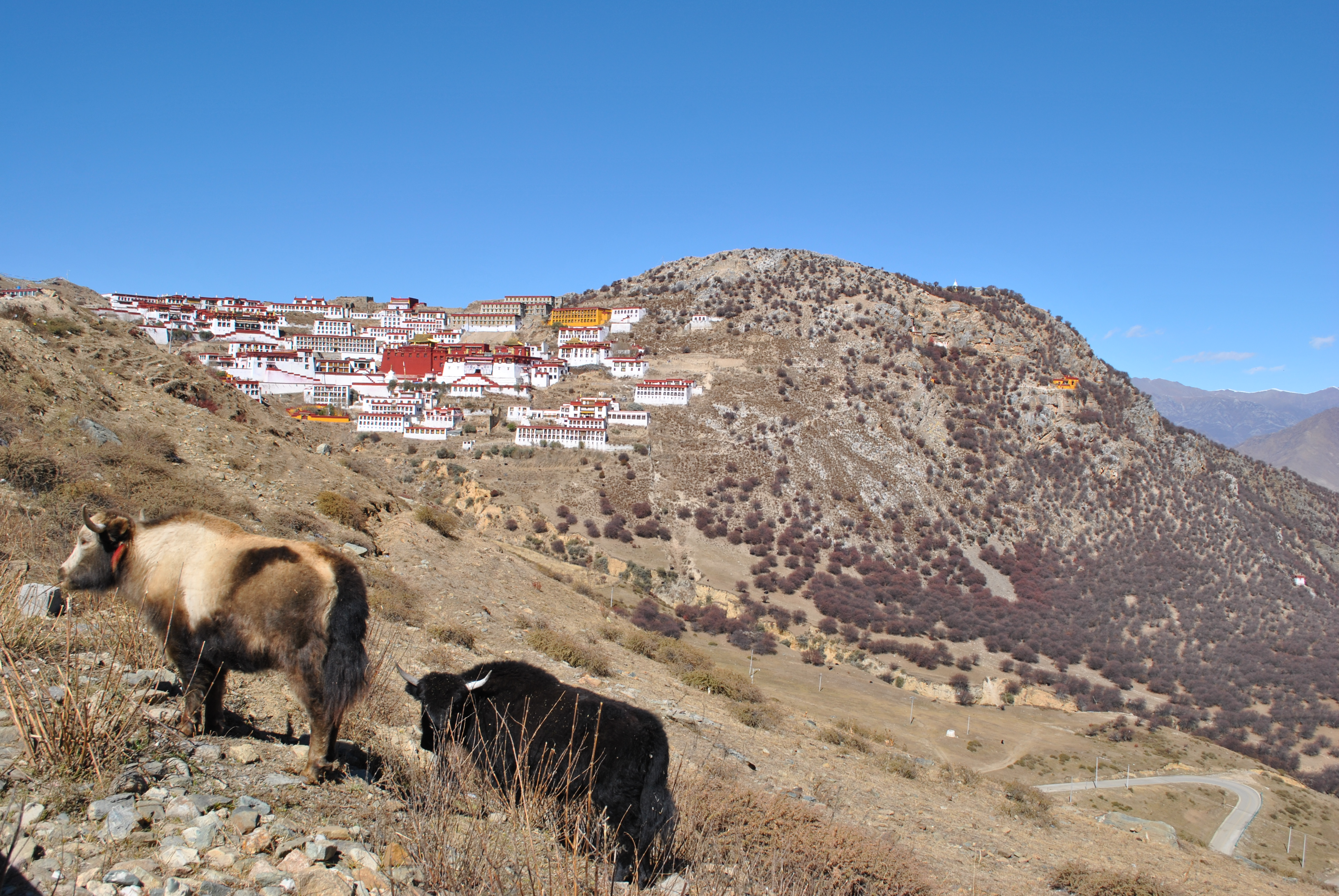
Ganden monastery, 2013

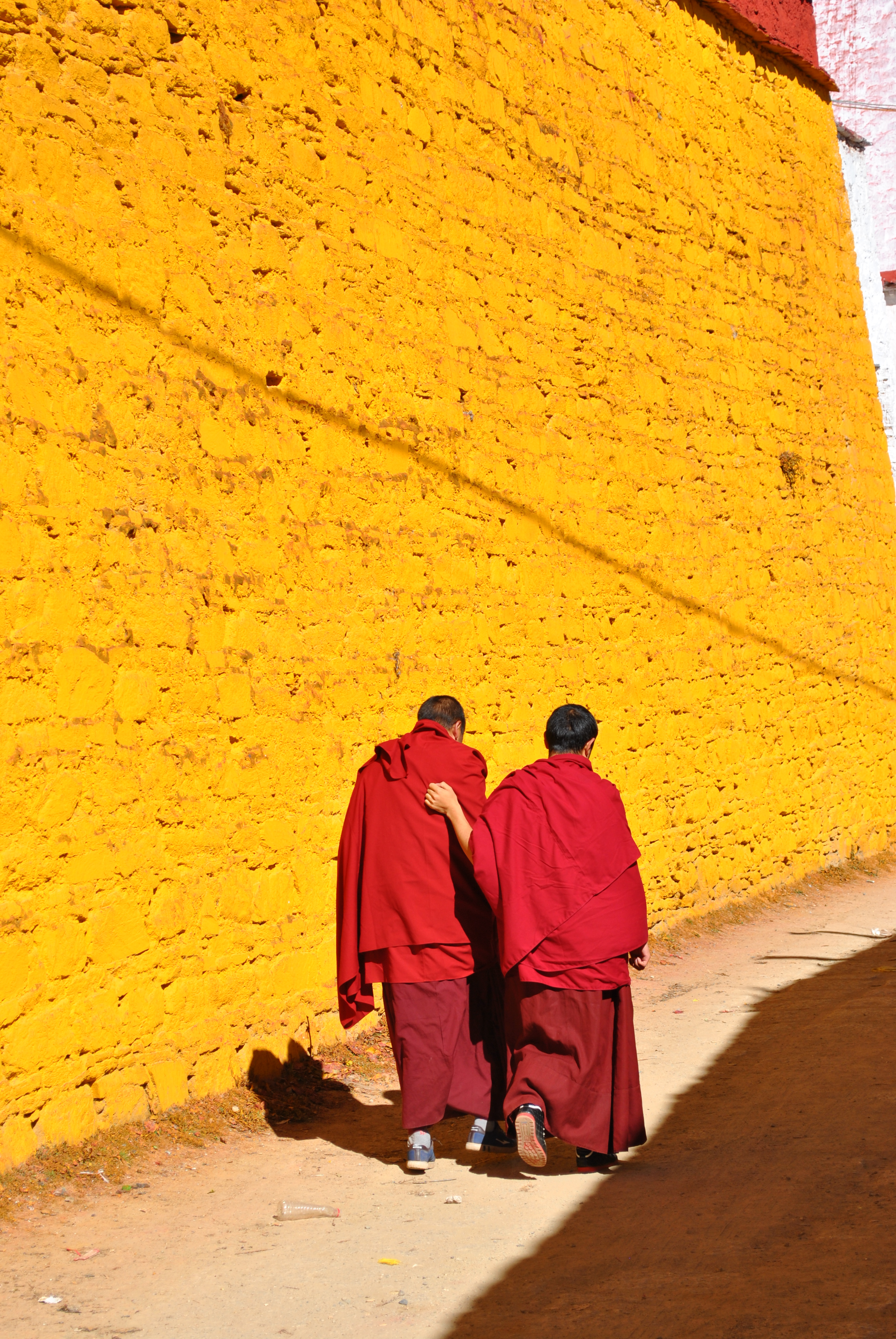
Monks at Ganden monastery

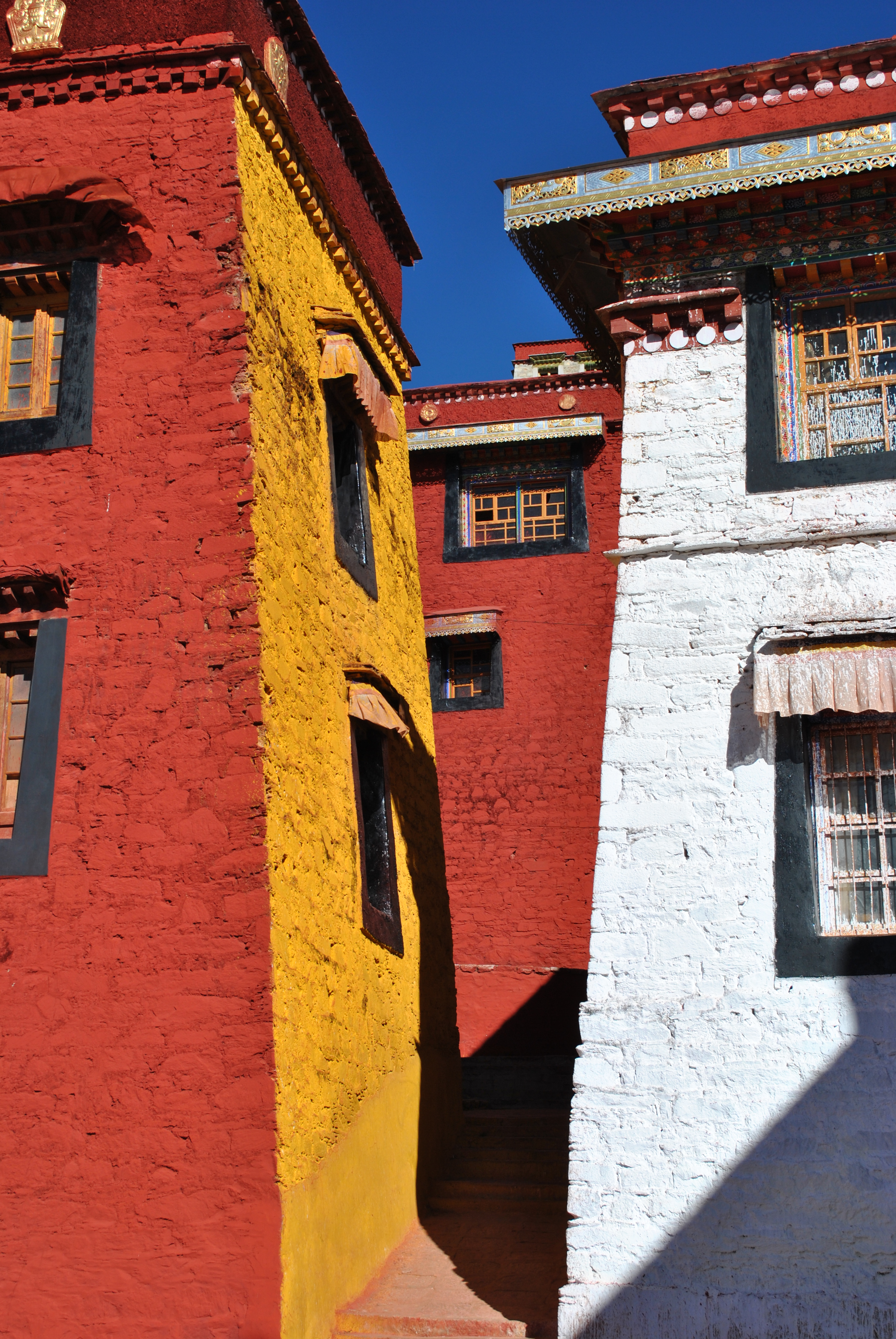
Ganden monastery after repainting in November 2013

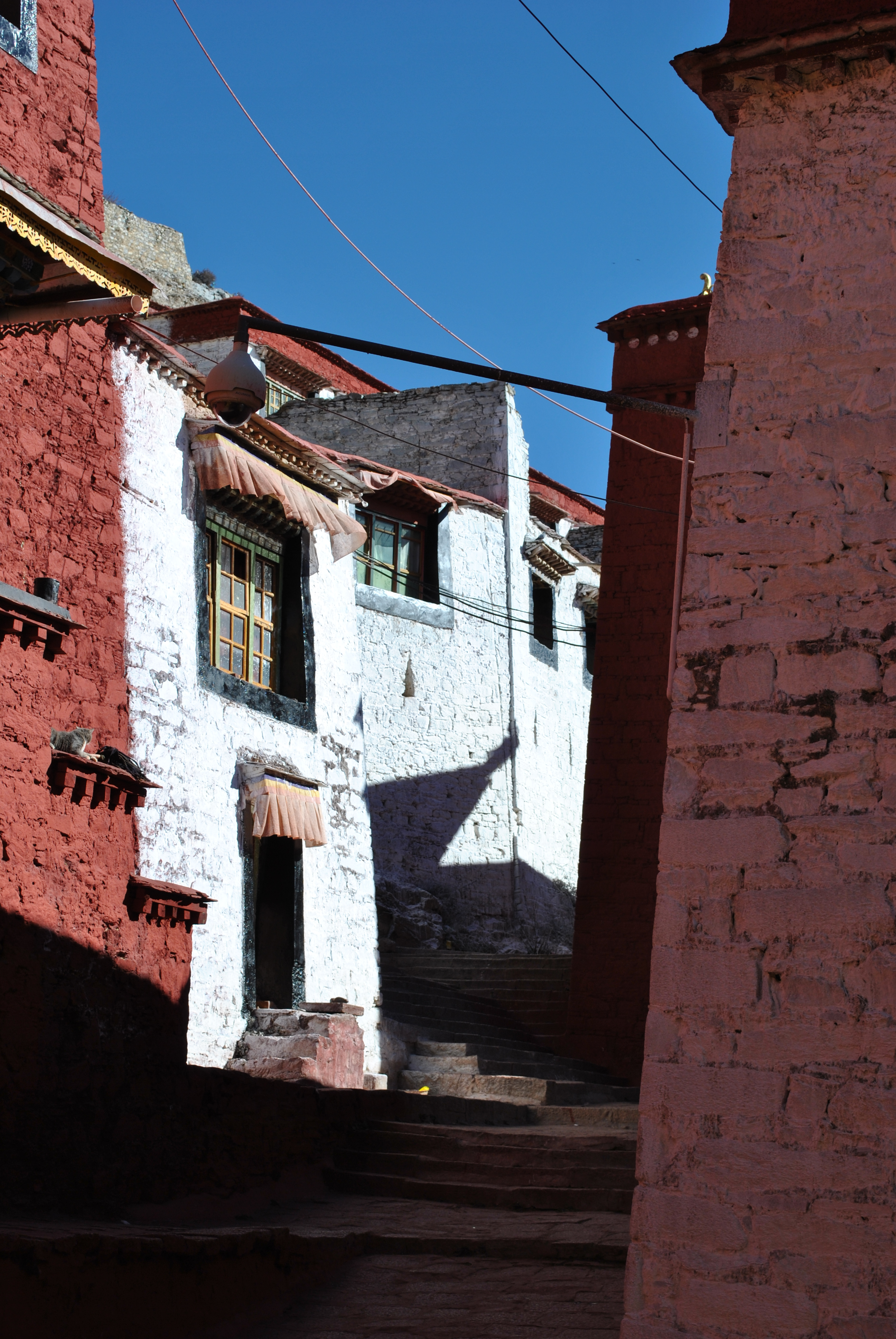
Ganden monastery, 2013

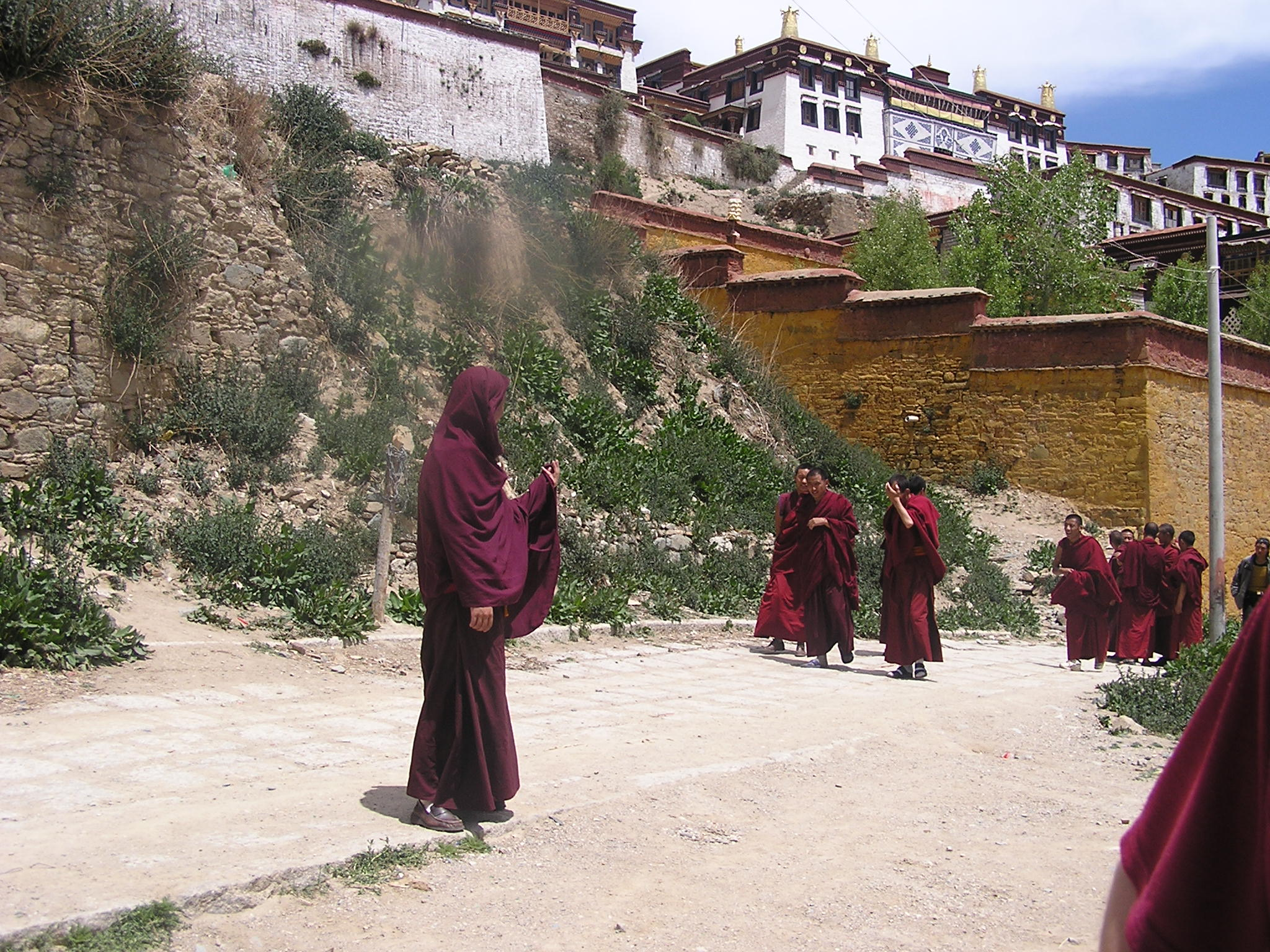

== Recent events ==
Early in 1996, after a ban had been imposed on pictures of the Dalai Lama, 400 monks at Ganden rioted. They were fired upon by PLA troops, apparently causing two deaths and several injuries, followed by the arrest of one hundred monks.

During the 2008 Tibetan uprising anniversary, Ganden Monastery monks participated in the mass demonstrations and protests which began on 10 March and spread throughout Tibet.

As of 2012 the population of monks has been reduced to about 400 monks.

== Establishment in India ==
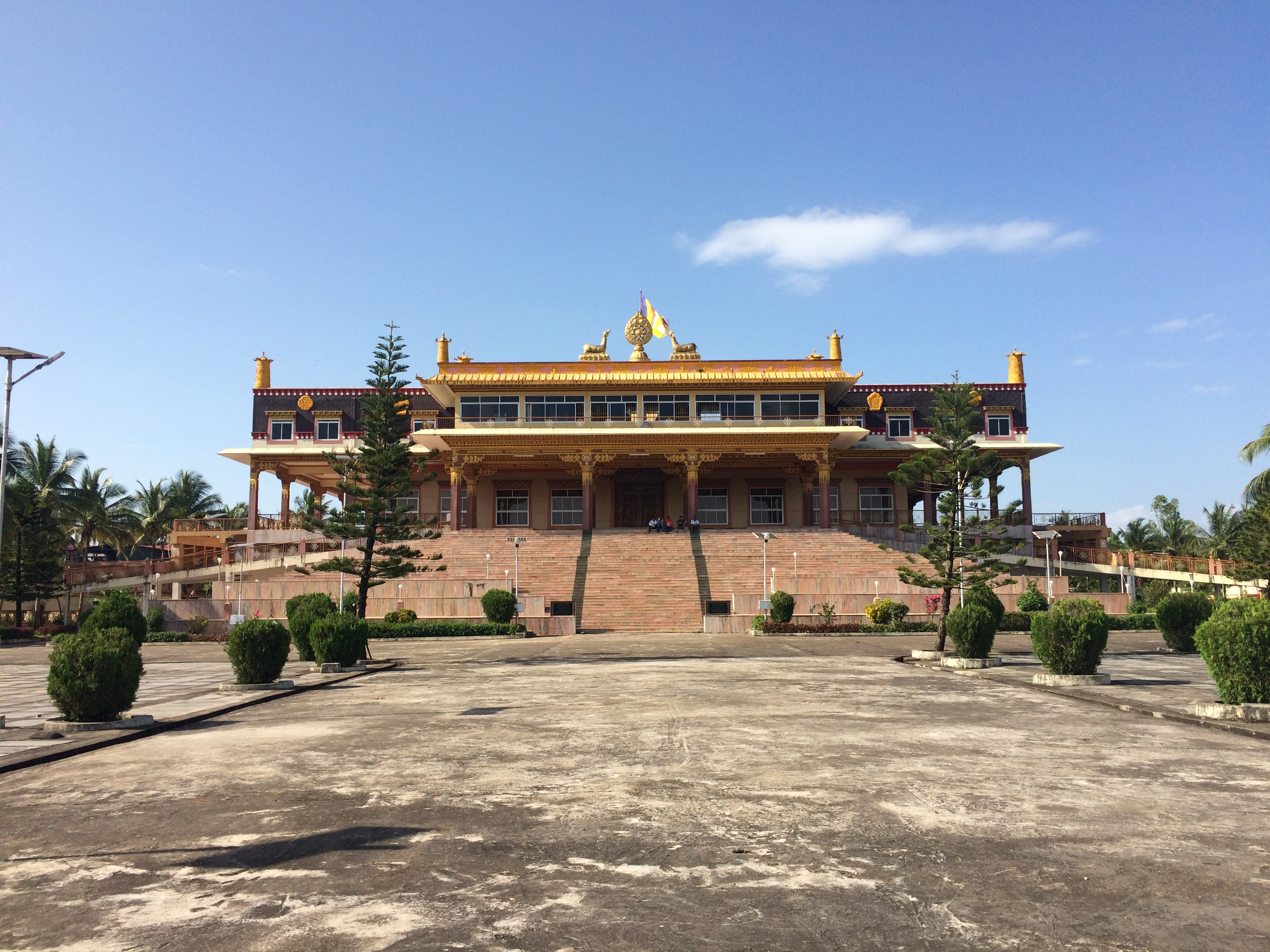
Ganden Monastery in Mundgod

The Ganden Monastery has been re-established in Karnataka, India by the Tibetan population in exile. The Ganden Monastery is in the Tibetan settlement at Mundgod. This settlement of Tibetan refugees is the largest of its kind in India and was first established in 1966, from land donated by the Indian government. In the Tibetan settlement near Mundgod are the Ganden and the Drepung Monastery. In 1999 there were about 13,000 residents. The Tibetan settlement consists of nine camps with two monasteries and one nunnery. They established a credit bank for farms, an agricultural institute and a craft center. Modern technology and communication technology are being introduced. The curriculum of the Ganden Monastery remains similar to the teachings of the pre-1959 Ganden Monastery. The Ganden Monastery Colleges Jangtse and Shartse have also been reestablished in India. They are named The Ganden Jangtse College and The Gaden Shartse Monastery. They are located in Karnataka.

In 2008, over 500 monks, who refused to adhere to the ban against the protective deity Dorje Shugden, enforced by the Dalai Lama's government in exile, were expelled from the Ganden Monastery in Mundgod, Karnataka, and founded in its immediate neighborhood the Shar Gaden Monastery, officially opened in October 2009. As a result, the Dokhang Khangtsen, the biggest division of Gaden Shartse Monastery, where most of the departing monks came from, ceased to exist.

== See also ==
- Ganden Phodrang

== Sources ==
- Berzin, Alexander (1991). "A Brief History of Ganden Monastery". Gelug Monasteries. Dharamsala, India: Chö-Yang, Year of Tibet Edition. Expanded to cover Tsenzhab Serkong Rinpoche II, September 2003
- Buckley, Michael (2012). Tibet. Bradt Travel Guides. ISBN 978-1-84162-382-5.
- Dowman, Keith (1988). The Power-places of Central Tibet: The Pilgrim's Guide. London: Routledge & Kegan Paul. ISBN 0-7102-1370-0.
- "Ganden Monastery in Tibet". Dhonden Foundation.
- Goldstein, Melvyn C. (2007). A History of Modern Tibet: The calm before the storm, 1951-1955. University of California Press. ISBN 978-0-520-24941-7.
- Laird, Thomas (2006). The Story of Tibet: Conversations with the Dalai Lama. New York: Grove Press. ISBN 978-0-8021-1827-1.
- "Official Opening of Shar Gaden Monastery, October 2009". Dorje Shugden. 2009-06-12.
- Rinpoche, Kyabje Zong; Molk, David (2006). Chod in the Ganden Tradition: The Oral Instructions of Kyabje Zong Rinpoche. Snow Lion Publications. ISBN 978-1-55939-813-8.
- Waddell, Laurence Austine (1972). The Buddhism of Tibet, or Lamaism. New York: Dover Publications. ISBN 0-486-20130-9. Reprint of Tibetan Buddhism: With Its Mystic Cults, Symbolism and Mythology, first edition 1895
