= Reting Tsangpo =

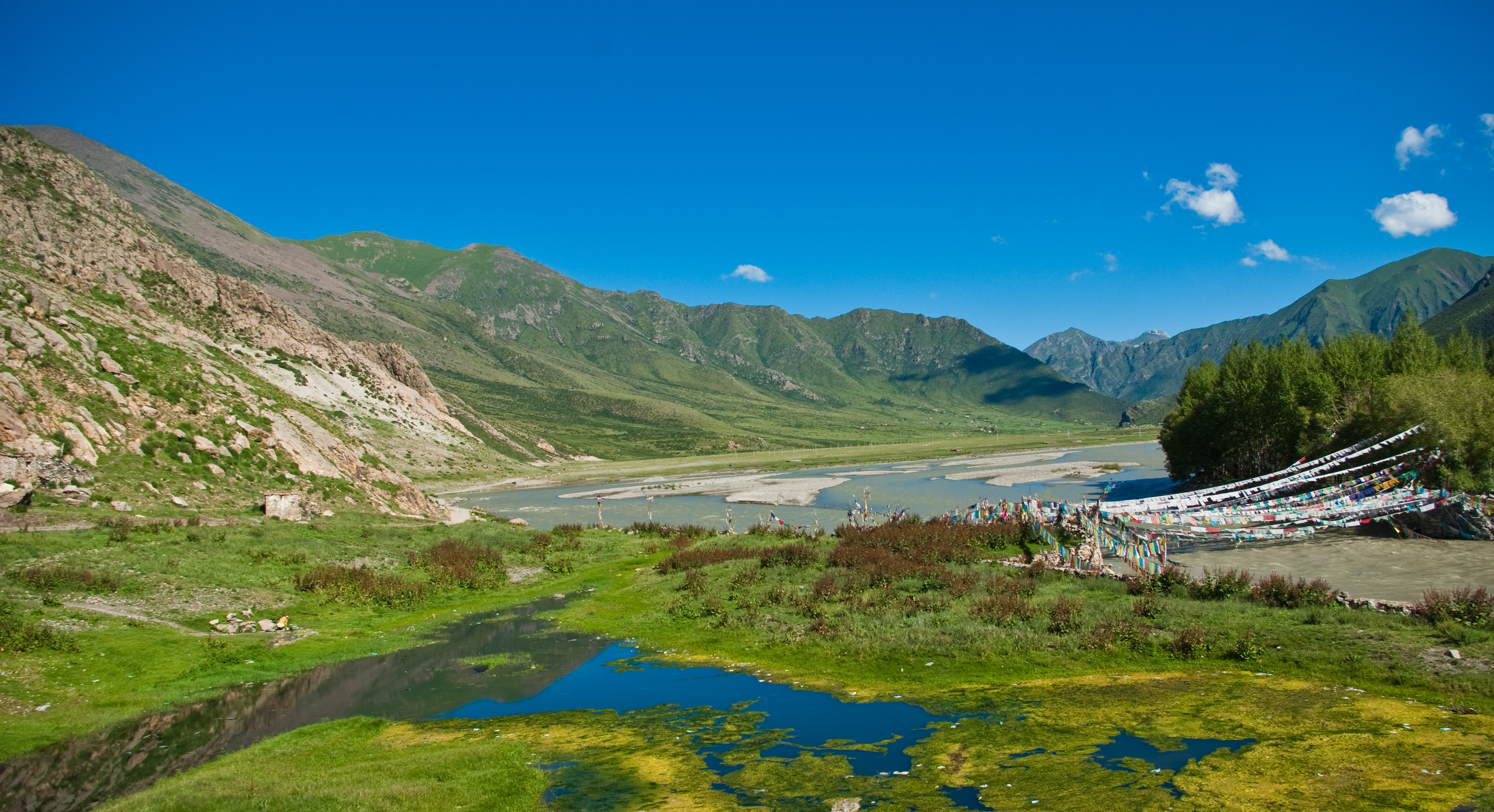
- Landscape near the Reting Monastery

- Lhasa prefecture-level city. Reting Tsangpo from the east joins other rivers at the Pangduo Dam to form the Lhasa River.

Location
- Country: Tibet

Physical characteristics
- Source
  - elevation: 5,500 m (18,000 ft)
- Mouth
  - coordinates: 30.191622°N 91.344371°E
  - elevation: 4,080 m (13,390 ft)

Basin features
- River system: Brahmaputra River

The Reting Tsangpo (Chinese: 热振河; pinyin: rè zhèn hé) is a river in the Tibet Autonomous Region of China. It is the main headwater of the Lhasa River. The river flows past Reting Monastery, founded in 1056. The terrain is geologically complex, with deeply eroded and faulted rocks that reflect the results of the collision of the Indian Plate with the Eurasian Plate.

== Course ==
The Reting Tsangpo originates in the Chenthangula Mountains at an elevation of about 5,500 metres (18,000 ft), and flows southwest. It has an average gradient of about 11 feet per mile (2.1 meters per kilometer). In one section the Reting Tsangpo runs through a 2,000 metres (6,600 ft) deep canyon. The river flows past the Reting Monastery. The monastery was founded in 1056 by Dromtön Gyelwai Jungne, a pupil of the Indian master Atiśa. The monastery is 21 kilometres (13 mi) from the mouth of the river.

The Lhasa River (or Kyi River) forms where the Reting Tsangpo is joined by two smaller rivers, the Phak Chu and the Phongdolha Chu which flows from Damxung County. The river is spanned by a large metal suspension bridge just above the juncture. The combined length of the Reting Tsangpo and the Lhasa River is about 400 kilometres (250 mi). The river is said to excellent for kayaking and white water rafting, although as of 2015 it had been visited by few tourists interested in these sports.

== Geology ==
The Reting Tsangpo flows through the east central region of Tibet's Eocene block. The average elevation of the region is about 16,000 feet (4,900 m). The Tsangpo Suture is to the south and the northwest extension of the Ailao Shan Fault is to the north. Rocks in this region include sedimentary rocks from the Paleozoic and Mesozoic into which granite has intruded during the Cretaceous. The rocks have metamorphosed and are deeply eroded and faulted.

The rocks exposed in the Reting Tsangpo canyon range in age from 400 Ma to 50 Ma. (Note: Ma: Million years ago) The result of faulting has been to often juxtapose relatively recent rocks with much older rocks. The complex geology is the result of the movement of the Indian continent towards Tibet over the last 200 million years or so. During the period from 125 Ma to 50 Ma the ocean floor between the two continents was pushed under Tibet, melted and injected large volumes of igneous rock into the Tibetan plate and onto Tibet's surface. About 50 million years ago India collided with Tibet, pushing up the Himalayas. Some parts of the ocean floor were pushed up onto the Tibetan Plateau and formed marble or slate. Sea fossils from 400 Ma are found in the river's canyons, and houses are roofed with slate.

Large faults developed over the last fifty million years, and these dictate the direction in which the rivers of the region flow. The faults in the rugged terrain typically run in an east–west direction. During the ice ages of the last two million years the Tibetan plateau and the Himalayas have been covered by the expanded polar ice cap several times. As the ice moved it eroded the rock, filling the river canyons with gravel. In some sections the river has cut through the gravel and flows swiftly over bedrock, and in some areas large boulders have fallen into the river and blocked it to form rapids.

== Sources ==
- McCue, Gary (2010). Trekking in Tibet: A Traveler's Guide. The Mountaineers Books. ISBN 978-1-59485-411-8.
- "Rafting the Reting Tsangpo in Tibet, August 2015". White Water Asia.
- Winn, Pete (2015). "Geology and Geography of the Reting Tsangpo and Lhasa River (Kyi Qu) in Tibet". Exploring the Rivers of Western China. Earth Science Expeditions. Archived from the original on 20 August 2007.
