= Pondo =

Pondo may refer to:

- Pondo people, Xhosa-speaking ethnic group who have given their name to Pondoland
- Pondo Water-Control Project, reservoir and dam on the Kyi River in Lhünzhub County to the east of Lhasa, Tibet, China
- Nor–Pondo languages, small language family of northern Papua New Guinea
- Mad Man Pondo, American professional wrestler
- Pana language, Mbum language of the Central African Republic
