= Liwu Park =

Park in Lhasa, Tibet, China

Liwu Park (Chinese: 柳梧公园) is a public park near Liwu Bridge in Chengguan District, Lhasa, Tibet Autonomous Region, China, adjacent to the Lhasa River.

== Geography ==
Construction of the park began in July 2007 and in May 2008 it was opened to the public. The central landscape of the park is the central island, which covers an area of about 100 square meters.
