= Yamdrok Hydropower Station =

Hydropower station in Lhoka, Tibet, China

- Official name: Chinese: 羊卓雍湖抽水蓄能电厂: Yangzhuoyong Lake Pumped Storage Power Plant
- Country: China
- Location: Lhoka Prefecture, Tibet Autonomous Region
- Coordinates: 29.2641°N 90.6064°E
- Opening date: 1997–98

Reservoir
- Creates: Yamdrok Lake

Power Station
- Hydraulic head: 840 m (2,760 ft)
- Turbines: 1 x 22.5 MW Francis-type
- Pump-generators: 4 x 22.5 MW reversible Francis-type
- Installed capacity: 112.5 MW

The Yamdrok Hydropower Station (Chinese: 羊卓雍湖抽水蓄能电厂), also known as the Yamdrok Yumtso or Yamzhog Yumcog hydropower station, is a hydroelectric power station just north of Yamdrok Lake, about 16 km (9.9 mi) southwest of Qüxü. The power station is in the Lhoka (Shannan) Prefecture of the Tibet Autonomous Region, China. Opposition to using the lake, considered holy, delayed construction at first. The project ran into difficulties and was two years late, completed in 1998.

Water is taken from the natural lake through long tunnels, without the need for a dam, and the power station discharges it into the Yarlung Tsangpo River. The design is a pumped-storage system, where off-peak power from other generators on the grid is used to pump water back into the lake when power is not needed. However, the river water has high levels of sediment and nitrates compared to the lake, and lower levels of minerals. Pumping may upset the lake's ecosystem, while not pumping may drain it.

== Plans ==
Yamdrok Tso is the largest freshwater lake in southern Tibet, with a surface area of 638 square kilometres (246 sq mi) at an elevation of 4,441 metres (14,570 ft). It drains an area of 6,100 square kilometres (2,400 sq mi). Some Tibetans consider that the Yamdrok Yumtso or Scorpion Lake, is holy and contains the spirit of Tibet. The Panchen Lama criticized the project. It was started in 1985, but due to vocal opposition from Tibetans and the intervention of the Panchen Lama the project was halted in 1986.

== Construction ==
The project was relaunched after the Panchen Lama died in 1989. In response to the Panchen Lama's concern about the environmental impact of draining the lake, the power station was planned as a pumped storage power station. It would discharge water into the river at peak hours, and pump water from the river up to the lake in off-peak hours, so there would be no overall loss of water volume in the lake. Rather than build a dam, four 6 kilometres (3.7 mi) tunnels were bored through the sides of the lake to carry water down to the power station. Four turbines were supplied by J.M. Voith AG of Germany, as well as pumps and steering systems. An Austrian company provided on-site engineers.

In 1991 between 4,000 and 5,000 members of the People's Armed Police began construction. In 1993 freshwater wells near the lake began to dry up. In June 1996 it was reported that the project had run into severe problems. When Vice Premier Wu Bangguo came to a ceremony where he would turn on the first turbine, the plant was not ready and electricity had to be brought in from Yangpachen thermal power plant. Inquiries revealed that the tunnels that brought water from the lake to the turbines were leaking badly and could not be used. It was said that the earth had collapsed in one tunnel and the lake had already dropped by 1 to 2 metres (3 ft 3 in to 6 ft 7 in). Fang Changquan, commander of the People's Armed Police construction brigade, was dismissed. The deputy commander of the construction brigade was given responsibility for the next project, building the Zhikong Hydro Power Station on the Lhasa River.

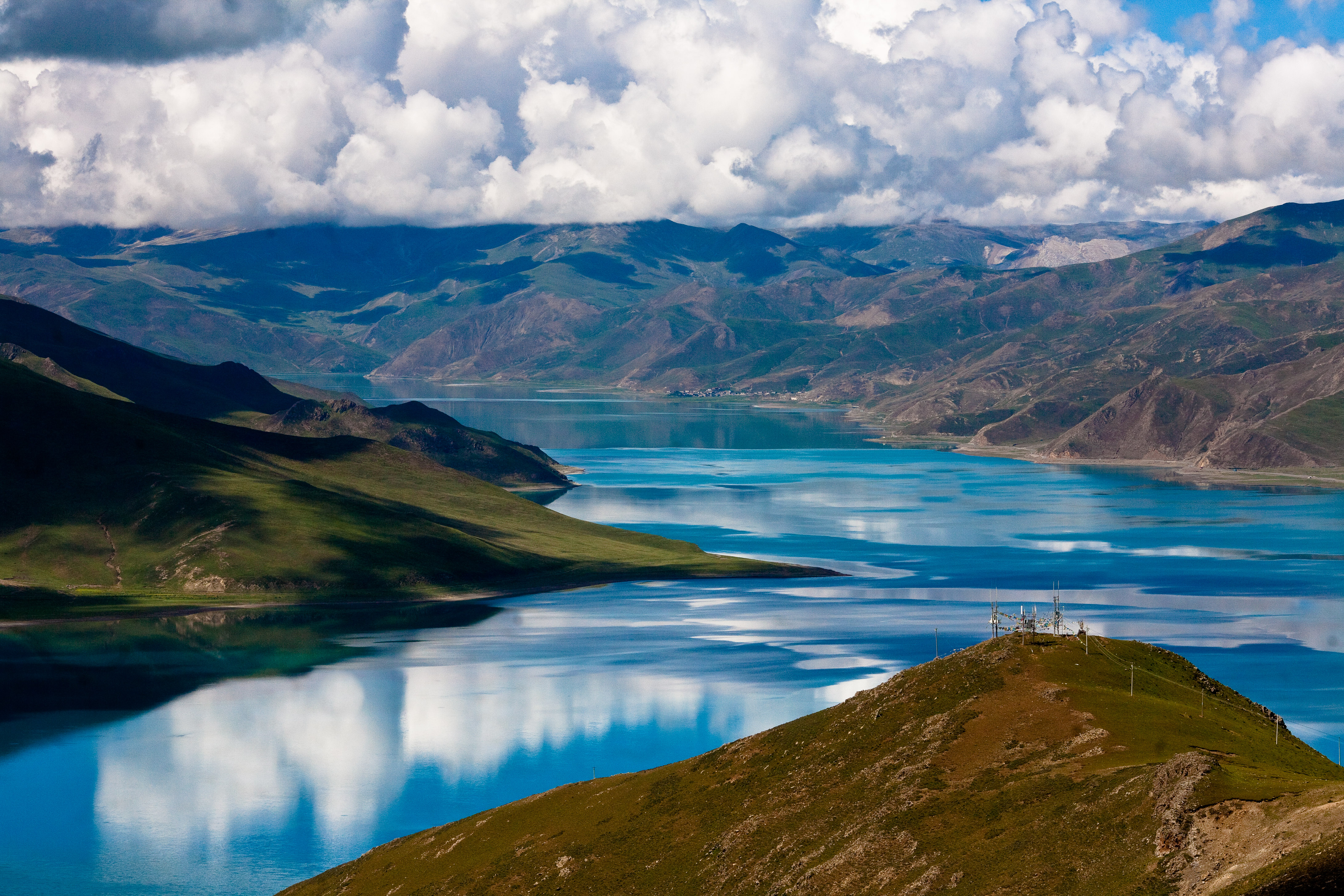
Yundrok Yumtso Lake

Trial operations began in 1997, and Xinhua reported that it was fully operational in September 1998. Jiang Zemin was present at the official opening ceremony on 18 September 1998. There was not enough power available for pumping, so it was used only for power generation, discharging the lake water into the river. The station displaced the Yangbajain Geothermal Field as the main power supply for Lhasa when it came into operation. The investment had cost almost 2 billion yuan.

== Description ==
The station has a pumping channel 6,000 metres (20,000 ft) long with a vertical drop of 840 metres (2,760 ft). It initially had four 22.5 MW reversible Francis turbine-generators, which delivered a total 90 MW of electricity and can reverse to pump water back into the lake. During the tenth five-year plan period (2001–05) a conventional 22.5 MW generator set was put into operation, bringing total installed capacity to 112.5 MW. Annual generating capacity is 0.8409 billion kwh. Each turbine uses two cubic meters of water per second. Water from the power stations passes through a settling basin 130 by 24 metres (427 by 79 ft) with effective depth of 7 to 8 metres (23 to 26 ft) storing about 26,000 cubic metres (920,000 cu ft), and in the reverse mode water is pumped from the settling basin to the lake.

== Environmental concern ==
The Yamdrok Tso lake is a resting place for many migratory birds. It is almost a closed system, fed by rain and melting snow from the surrounding mountains, and drained only by a small tributary of the Yarlung Tsangpo. The inflow of water to the lake from the shores is balanced by evaporation, leaving high levels of dissolved minerals that give the lake a deep turquoise blue color. The lake is also low in nitrates and sediment compared to the river, so pumping river water into the lake would affect the water quality and could cause environmental problems. Without pumping, the lake level will drop steadily. Indian hydroelectrical experts have expressed skepticism about the stated plan to pump water into the lake when power demand is low. They note that the energy needed to pump water up to the lake will be much greater than the energy produced when water falls down from the lake, and power would also be lost in transmission from Lhasa and beyond to the pumps, so replenishment of the lake would be uneconomical. The saline lake water may also affect the quality of river water downstream from the tailrace outlet.

== Sources ==
- Ackerly, John (24 June 1996). "Chinese officials confront failure of yamdrok tso electric project". World Tibet Network News. Archived from the original on 24 February 2015.
- An, Caidan (2003). Tibet China: Travel Guide. 五洲传播出版社. ISBN 978-7-5085-0374-5.
- Arpi, Claude (2005). India and Her Neighbourhood: A French Observer's Views. Har-Anand Publications. ISBN 978-81-241-1097-3.
- Buckley, Michael (11 November 2014). Meltdown in Tibet: China's Reckless Destruction of Ecosystems from the Highlands of Tibet to the Deltas of Asia. St. Martin's Press. ISBN 978-1-137-47472-8.
- Burke, Edmund (2009). The Environment and World History. University of California Press. ISBN 978-0-520-25687-3.
- Chellaney, Brahma (3 October 2012). Water: Asia's New Battleground. HarperCollins Publishers. ISBN 978-93-5029-299-0.
- China Overseas Development Association (2015). "Reflections of Electric Power Construction in Tibet". ChinaGoAbroad. Archived from the original on 11 February 2015.
- "Current Situation, Yamdrok Tso". Tibet Natural Environment Conservation Network. 18 June 2014.
- "Jiang Zemin writes inscription at opening of Tibet Yangzhuoyong Lake Pumped Storage Station". Xinhua News Agency. 19 September 1998. Archived from the original on 9 August 2004.
- Li, Zhao-xia; Jiang, Xiao-yan (2011). "Ecosystem services of highland lakes and their impact on hydropower development". Advances in Science and Technology of Water Resources. Archived from the original on 12 February 2015.
- Moore, Malcolm (14 October 2008). "China plans dams across Tibet". The Telegraph (UK).
- "Tibet Yangzhuoyong Lake Pumped Storage Power Plant" (in Chinese). China Electricity Council Hydroelectric Branch. Archived from the original on 12 February 2015.
