= Ngachen Hydropower Station =

Hydropower station in Tibet, China

Ngachen Hydropower Station 纳金水电站
- Country: People's Republic of China
- Location: on a tributary of the Lhasa River
- Purpose: Power
- Construction began: 1958

The Ngachen Hydropower Station (Chinese: 纳金水电站), also called as Najin Hydropower Station, is the first hydropower plant in the Tibet Autonomous Region since the founding of the People's Republic of China. It is located on a tributary of the Lhasa River, 15 li away from Lhasa. The hydropower station featured six generators and an installed capacity of 7,500 kilowatts.

Ngachen Hydropower Station is the first hydropower station built with the assistance of the Central Committee of the Chinese Communist Party.

== History ==
In 1957, the Tibet Working Committee of the Chinese Communist Party (中共西藏工委) and the Tibet Military District decided to excavate the Ngachen Mountain (纳金山) and build Ngachen Hydropower Station. In 1958, the construction of the plant began, and was completed in 1960.

On April 19, 1960, the plant was completed to generate electricity, and the ordinary people in Lhasa were able to use electric lights for the first time.
