= Tsurphu River =

River in Lhasa, Tibet, China

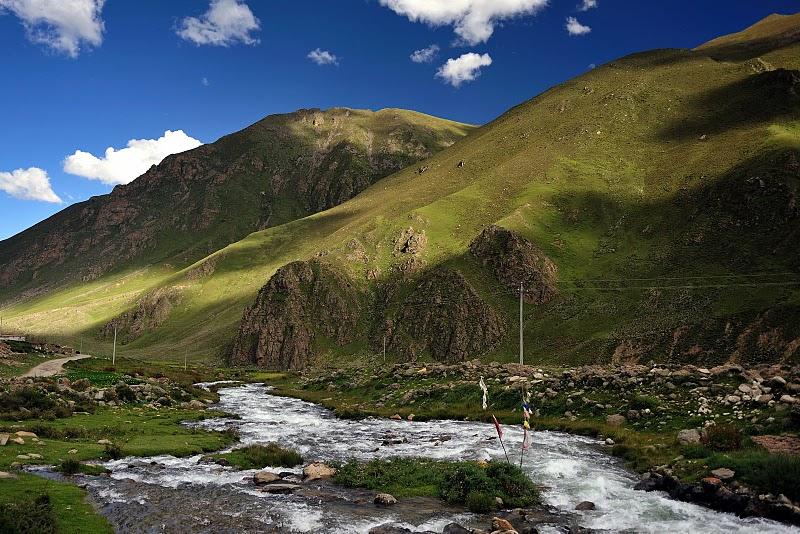
Tsurphu river

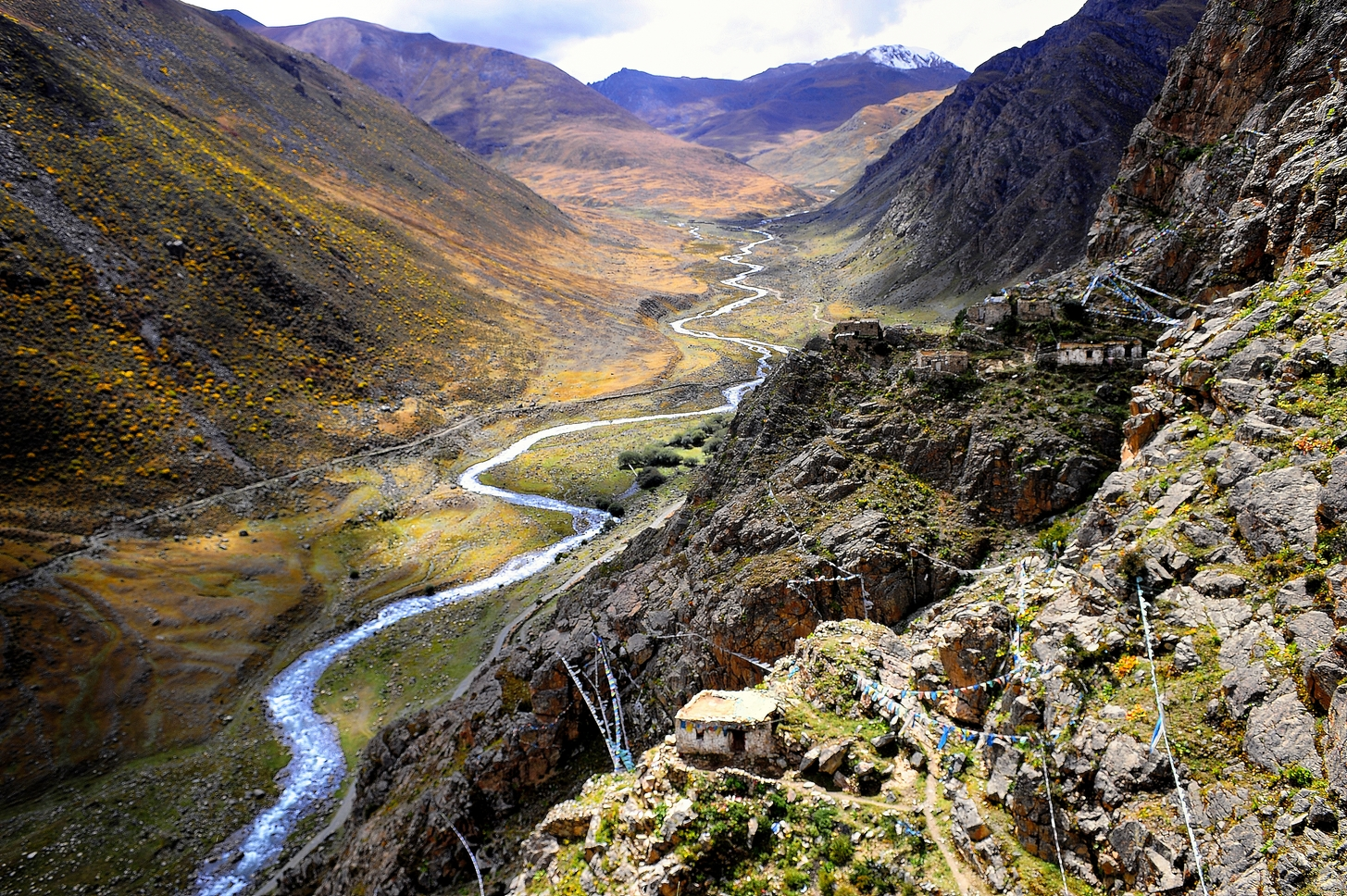
Tsurphu river

Tsurphu River (Chinese: 楚布曲) or Turphu River, also known as Saiqu, is a river located in the Lhasa City, Tibet Autonomous Region, the People's Republic of China.

== Geography ==
Tsurphu River is the right bank tributary of Duilong River, originated in the town of Gurong southwest of Zagara, flowing north to Tsurphu Monastery southwest of the turn eastward, through the village of Naga, Gurong village. The river is 41 kilometers long, with a watershed area of 618 square kilometers and an average annual runoff of 155 million cubic meters. The vegetation in watershed is sparse, dominated by alpine scrub meadow ecosystem. Upstream of the north bank is Tsurphu Monastery, the main temple of the Karma Kagyu school of Tibetan Buddhism, which is the successive generations of the Karmapa's residence and one of the Tibet Autonomous Region Cultural Relic Protection Units.
