= Lhasa River Special Bridge =

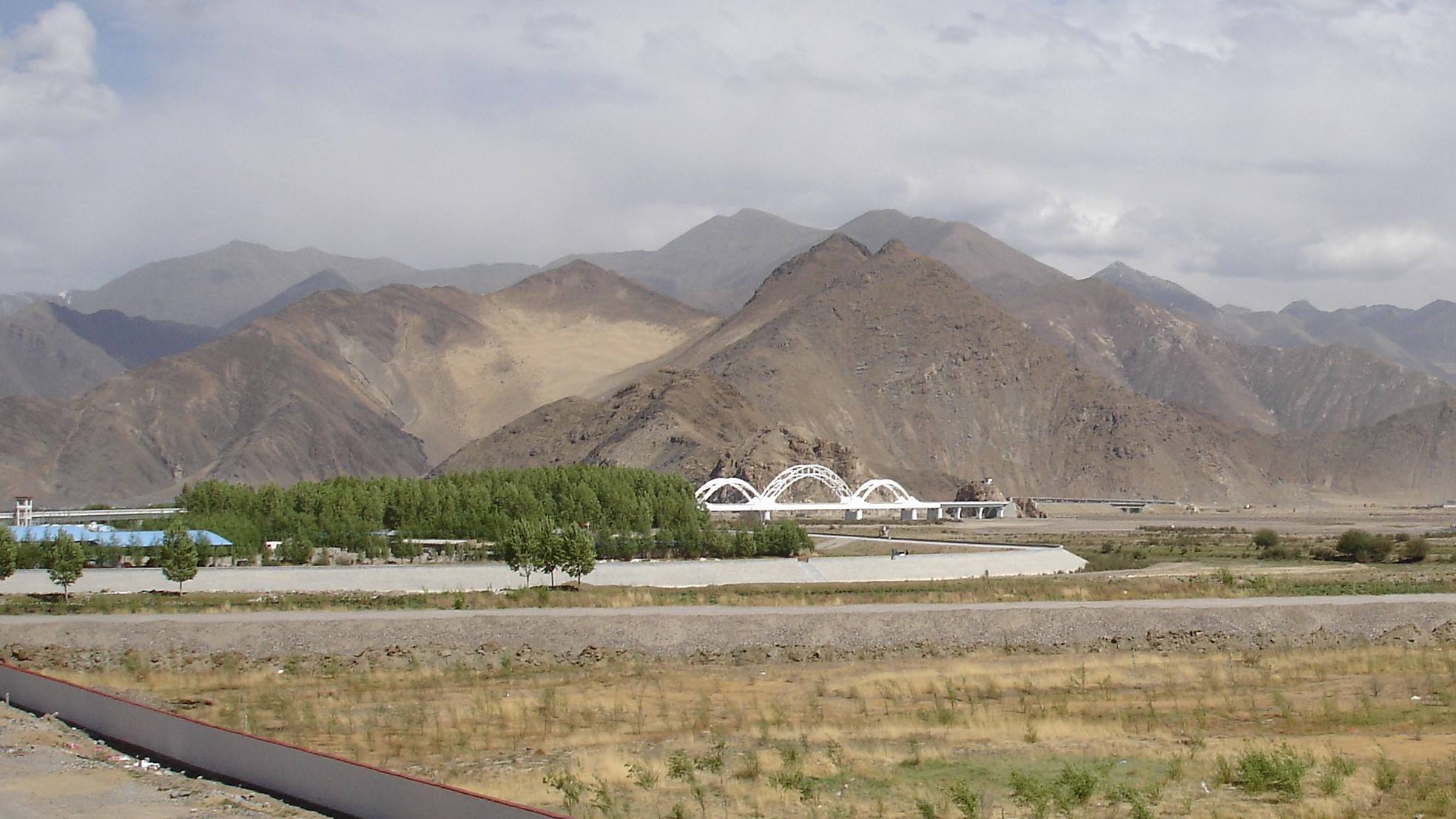
- Coordinates: 29°37′34″N 91°01′54″E
- Carries: Qinghai–Tibet railway
- Crosses: Lhasa River
- Locale: Lhasa, Tibet

Characteristics
- Design: dropped-arch bridge
- Total length: 928.85m

History
- Opened: July 2006

Location
- Interactive map of Lhasa River Special Bridge

Lhasa River Special Bridge (Chinese: 拉萨河特大桥) is a bridge over the Qinghai-Tibet Railway, located on the Lhasa River in Lhasa.

== History ==
Lhasa River Special Bridge is constructed by the Bridge Bureau of China Railway, with a total length of 928.85 meters and a main span of 108 meters, which was opened on May 13, 2005, and opened in July 2006 with the opening of Qinghai-Tibet Railway. Lhasa River Bridge is the only non-standard design mega bridge in the whole line of Qinghai-Tibet Railway, the main pier is yak-legged variable-section double cylindrical pier, the approach pier is snow lotus type variable-section round-end shaped pier, and the main span is a double-layered stacked-arch structure, which integrates the Tibetan characteristics and modern style.
