= Ani Tsankhung Nunnery =

- Tibetan transcription(s); Tibetan: ཨ་ནི་མཚམས་ཁུང; Wylie transliteration: A ni mtshams khung
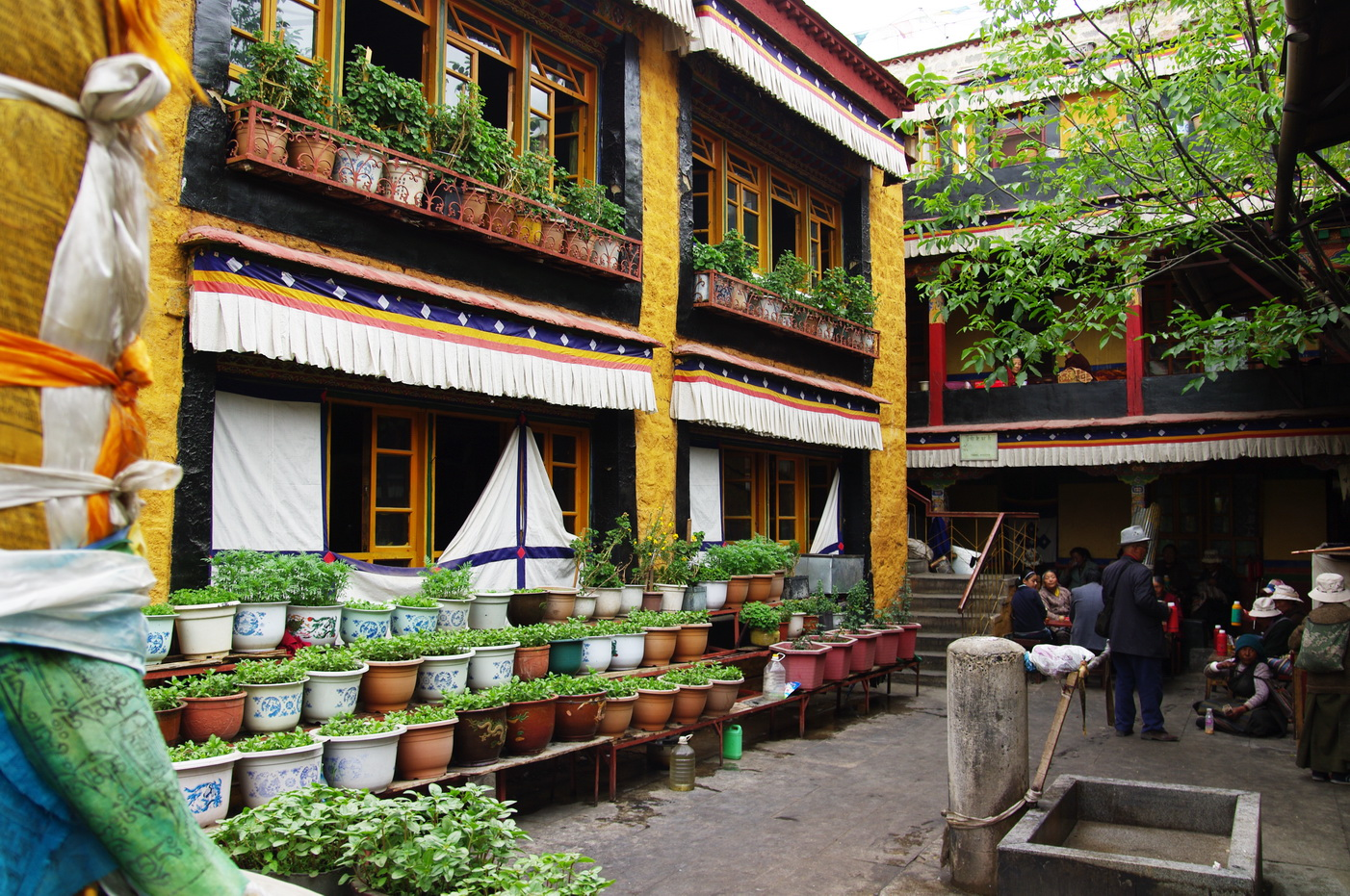
- Rear of the nunnery

- Location within Tibet

Religion
- Affiliation: Tibetan Buddhism
- Sect: Gelug

Location
- Location: Lhasa Prefecture, Tibet, China
- Country: China
- Interactive map of Ani Tsankhung Nunnery
- Coordinates: 29.65118°N 91.13625°E

Architecture
- Founder: Songtsen Gampo
- Established: 7th century

Ani Tsankhung Nunnery (Tibetan: ཨ་ནི་མཚམས་ཁུང, Wylie: A ni mtshams khung Chinese: 阿尼仓空寺; pinyin: Ā ní cāng kōng sì) is a nunnery of the Gelug school of Tibetan Buddhism in the city of Lhasa, Tibet Autonomous Region, China. It was built in the 15th century on a site that had been used for meditation by the 7th century Tibetan king Songtsen Gampo. The nuns support themselves through alms and manufacturing items such as clothing and printed texts.

== Building ==
The word ani (Tibetan: ཨ་ནི, Wylie: a ni) means 'nun', and tshamkhung (Tibetan: མཚམས་ཁུང, Wylie: mtshams khung) means 'a place for spiritual retreat', or 'hermitage'. Ani Tsankhung occupies a yellow building in the Barkhor area of downtown Lhasa. It is southeast of the Jokhang temple, and is the only nunnery in the old city of Lhasa. The building is three stories high. In the main hall there is an image of Chenresig, the multi-armed Bodhisattva of Compassion. Behind this there is a 7th-century meditation chamber that was used by Songtsen Gampo. The nunnery has a collection of thirteen Thangkas from Ming and Qing dynasties depicting Buddhas and Bodhisattvas.

== History ==
The 7th century Tibetan king Songtsen Gampo used to meditate at a natural cave in this location, and recited prayers to reduce the danger of flooding by the Lhasa River. Doctor Gewahum meditated here in the 12th century. Kujor Tokden, a close disciple of Tsongkhapa, established the nunnery in the 15th century. The Tibetan Living Buddha Samding Dorje Phagmo began her life as a Buddhist at the monastery. The Lama Pabongkhapa Déchen Nyingpo and Tampa Dhoedrak, throne holder of Ganden Monastery, enlarged the nunnery to its present size early in the 20th century.

The nunnery was closed for ten years during the Cultural Revolution, its statues destroyed and the nuns evicted. Later it was allowed to reopen by the Lhasa Municipal Bureau of Religious Affairs. Today there are more than one hundred resident nuns.

== Activities ==
The youngest nuns are sixteen. The young women live on the ground floor and the older people live upstairs. The nuns are poor, dependent on alms given for their prayers, and on manufacturing goods for sale. Their work includes sewing, weaving and making handicrafts. They also have a small workshop where they print religious texts. The nuns run an inexpensive outdoor restaurant, which is busy at lunch time, serving bowls of noodles and dumplings.

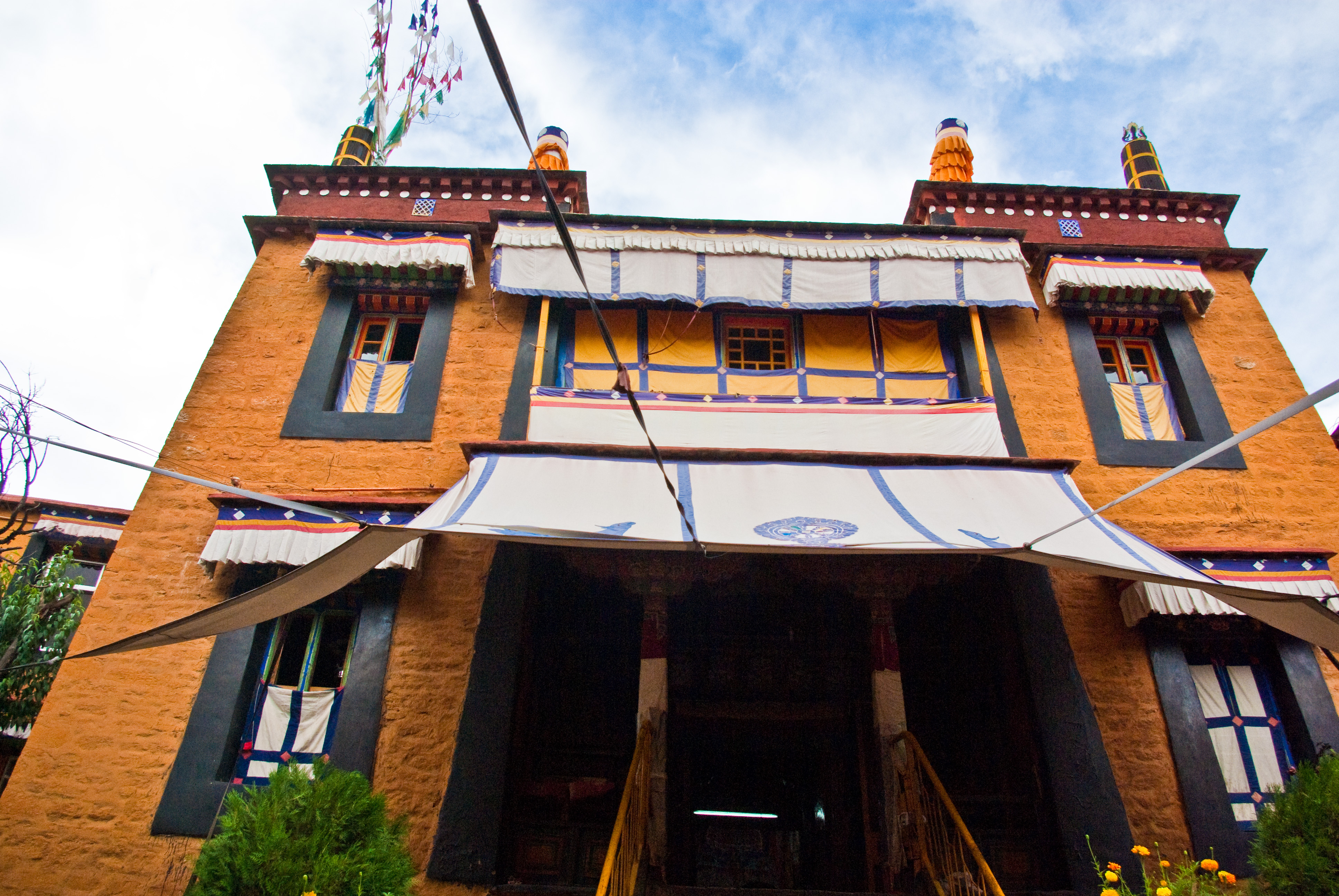
Front of the nunnery

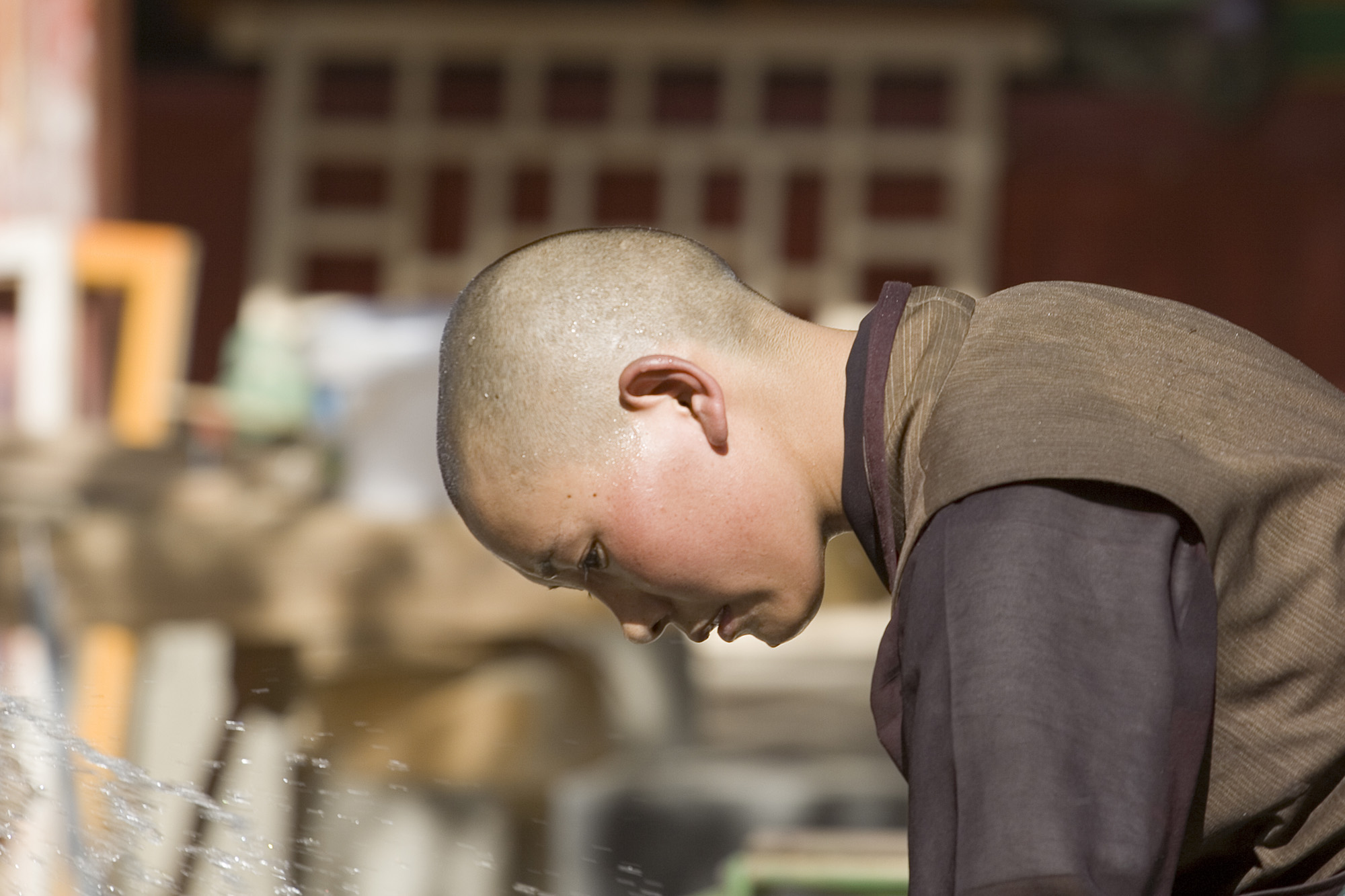
A young Buddhist nun at the nunnery

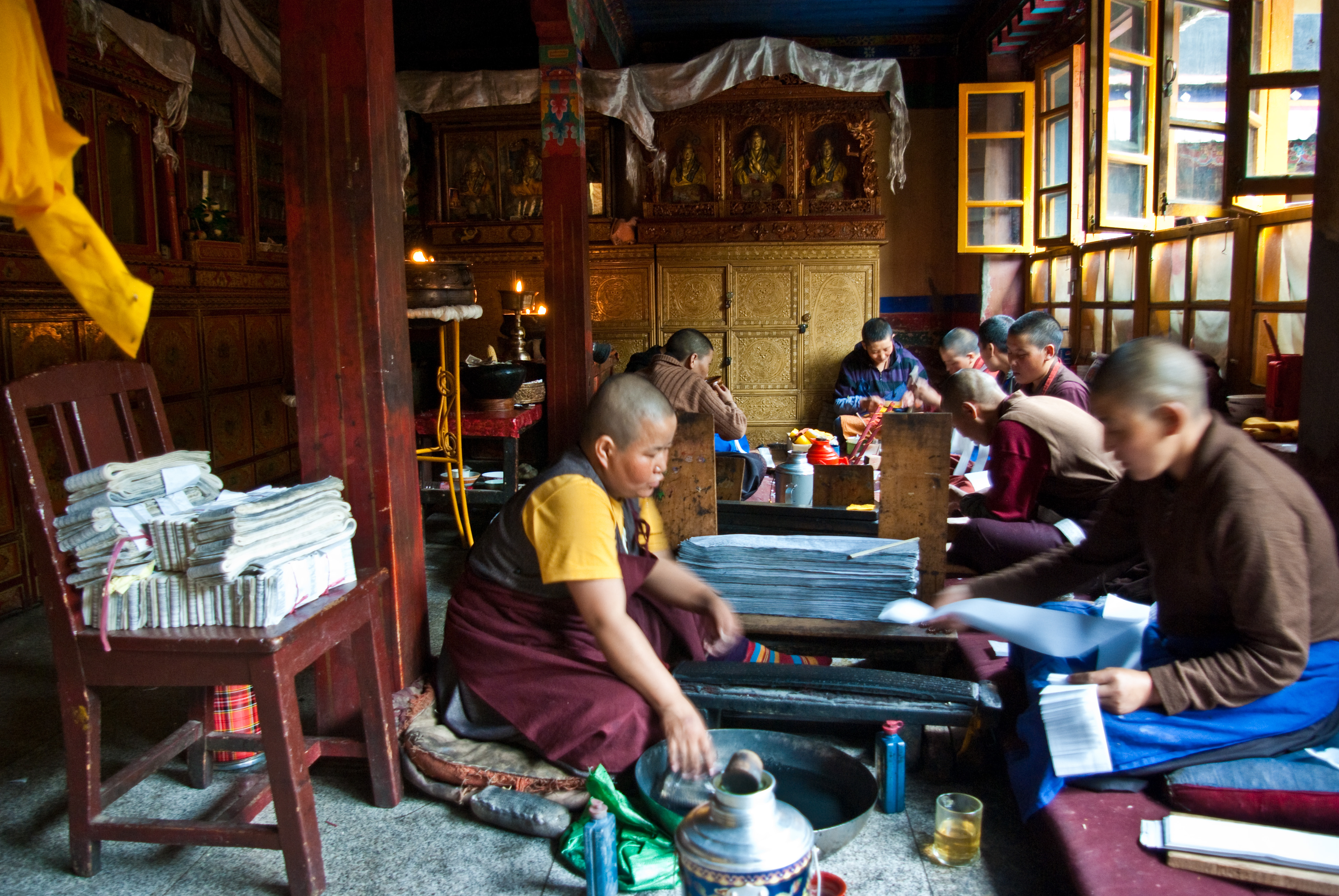
Printing holy texts

== Sources ==
- "Ani Tsankhung Monastery". Easytour China.
- Eyewitness Travel (2014-06-02). DK Eyewitness Travel Guide: China. DK Publishing. ISBN 978-1-4654-3093-9.
- Kelly, Margaret (2011). Fodor's China. Fodor's Travel Publications. ISBN 978-0-307-48053-8.
- "Lhasa Ani Tsankhung Monastery". Hong Kong Po Lin Monastery. Archived from the original on 2015-02-22.
- "Lhasa Nunnery". My Doramac. 2010-07-09.
- Rennie, Frank; Mason, Robin (2008). Bhutan: Ways of Knowing. IAP. ISBN 978-1-59311-735-1.
