= Zhikong Hydro Power Station =

Dam in Maizhokunggar, Tibet, China

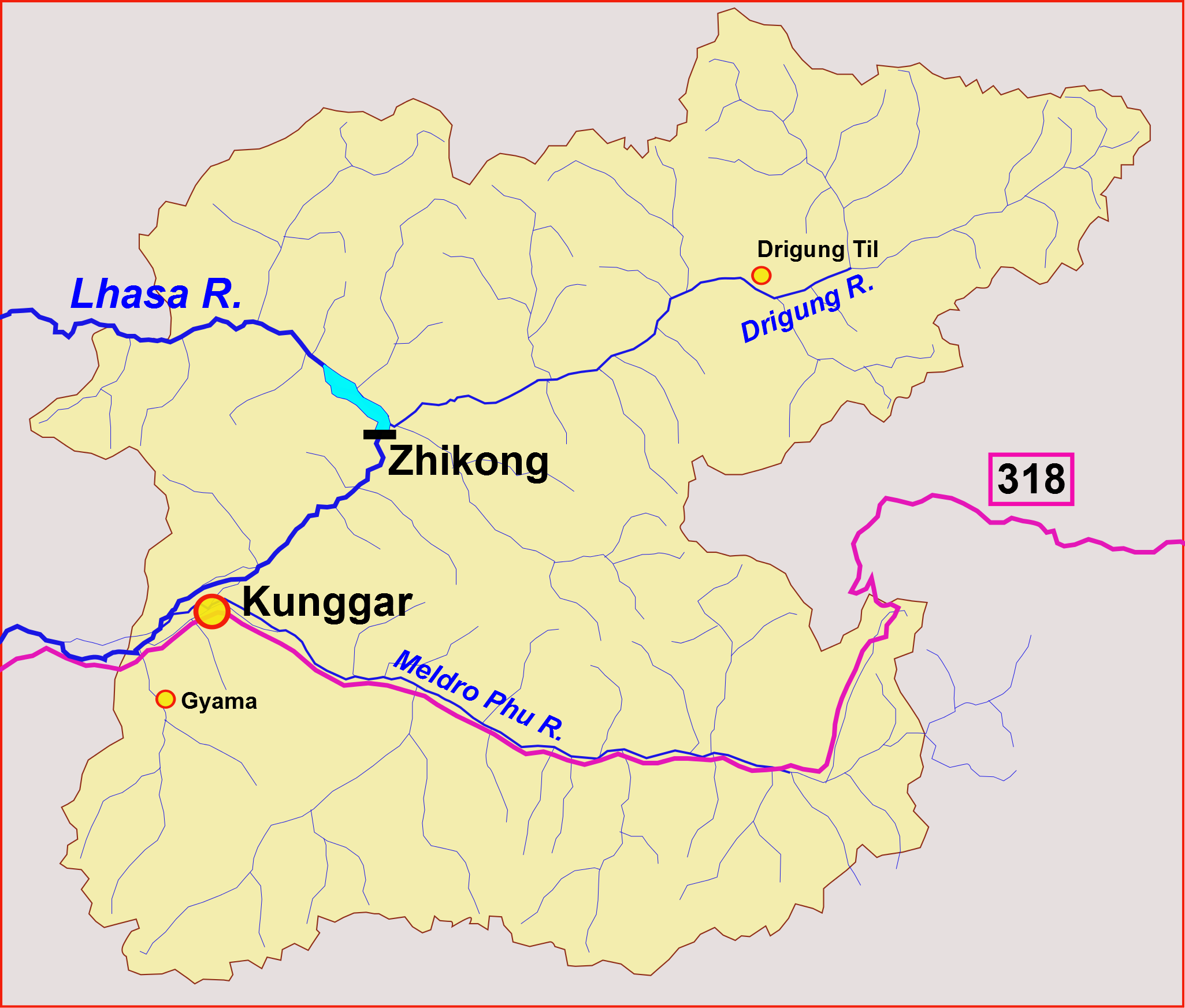
- Zhikong Hydro Power Station in Maizhokunggar County

- Location of Zhikong Hydro Power Station in Tibet Autonomous Region
- Official name: Chinese: 直孔水电站
- Country: China
- Location: Maizhokunggar County, Lhasa, Tibet Autonomous Region
- Coordinates: 29°58′6.78″N 91°52′36.55″E
- Purpose: Hydroelectric
- Status: Operational
- Construction began: May 2003
- Opening date: 23 September 2007
- Operator: China Huaneng Group

Dam and spillways
- Type of dam: Embankment, rock-fill
- Height: 50 metres (160 ft)

Reservoir
- Total capacity: 225,000,000 cubic metres (7.9×10^{9} cu ft)
- Normal elevation: 12,660 feet (3,860 m)

Power Station
- Commission date: 2006-2007
- Type: Conventional
- Turbines: 4 x 25 MW Francis-type
- Installed capacity: 100 MW
- Annual generation: 407 GWh

The Zhikong Hydro Power Station (Chinese: 直孔水电站) is a reservoir and power station on the Lhasa River in Maizhokunggar County to the east of Lhasa, Tibet, China. It came into operation in 2007, and has a capacity of 100 MW.

== Description ==
The Zhikong Hydro Power Station lies between the middle and lower reaches of the Lhasa River, also called the Kyi River. It is about 100 kilometres (62 mi) northeast of Lhasa, in Maizhokunggar County. It is at an elevation of 12,660 feet (3,860 m) above sea level, downstream from the 160 MW Pangduo Hydro Power Station at 13,390 feet (4,080 m). The Zhikong Dam, a rock-fill dam, is 50 metres (160 ft) tall. It impounds 225,000,000 cubic metres (7.9×10^{9} cu ft) of water. The plant has four 25 MW Francis turbines supplied by Kunming, and is operated by the China Huaneng Group. Installed capacity is 100 MW and annual production is about 407 GWh. The reservoir is also used for flood control and irrigation.

== Construction ==
The Lhasa River Zhi Kong hydroelectric power station was a key project of the tenth five-year plan. Construction began in May 2003, with the No 8 Hydroelectricity Corp of the Armed Police Force responsible for engineering, procurement, and construction. After a fiasco with the Yamdrok Hydropower Station in 1996, 120 kilometres (75 mi) south of Lhasa, the deputy commander of the People's Armed Police construction brigade was placed in charge of the project. Construction cost 1.37 billion yuan. The first generator was commissioned in 2006 and the power station was put into full operation on 23 September 2007.

== Sources ==
- Buckley, Michael (11 November 2014). Meltdown in Tibet: China's Reckless Destruction of Ecosystems from the Highlands of Tibet to the Deltas of Asia. St. Martin's Press. ISBN 978-1-137-47472-8.
- "China region completes work on 100-MW Zhikong". HydroWorld. 28 February 2007.
- "Hydroelectric Power Plants in China - Tibet". Platts UDI World Electric Power Plants Data Base. 3 October 2012.
- Pletcher, Kenneth (15 August 2010). The Geography of China: Sacred and Historic Places. The Rosen Publishing Group. ISBN 978-1-61530-134-8.
- Tsering, Bhuchung K. (24 June 1996). "Chinese officials confront failure of yamdrok tso electric project". World Tibet Network News. Archived from the original on 24 February 2015.
- Zheng, Peng (24 September 2007). "Lhasa River Zhi Kong hydroelectric power station put into operation". China Tibet Information Center. Archived from the original on 6 February 2015.
