= Yangbajain Geothermal Power Station =

Power station in Lhasa, Tibet, China

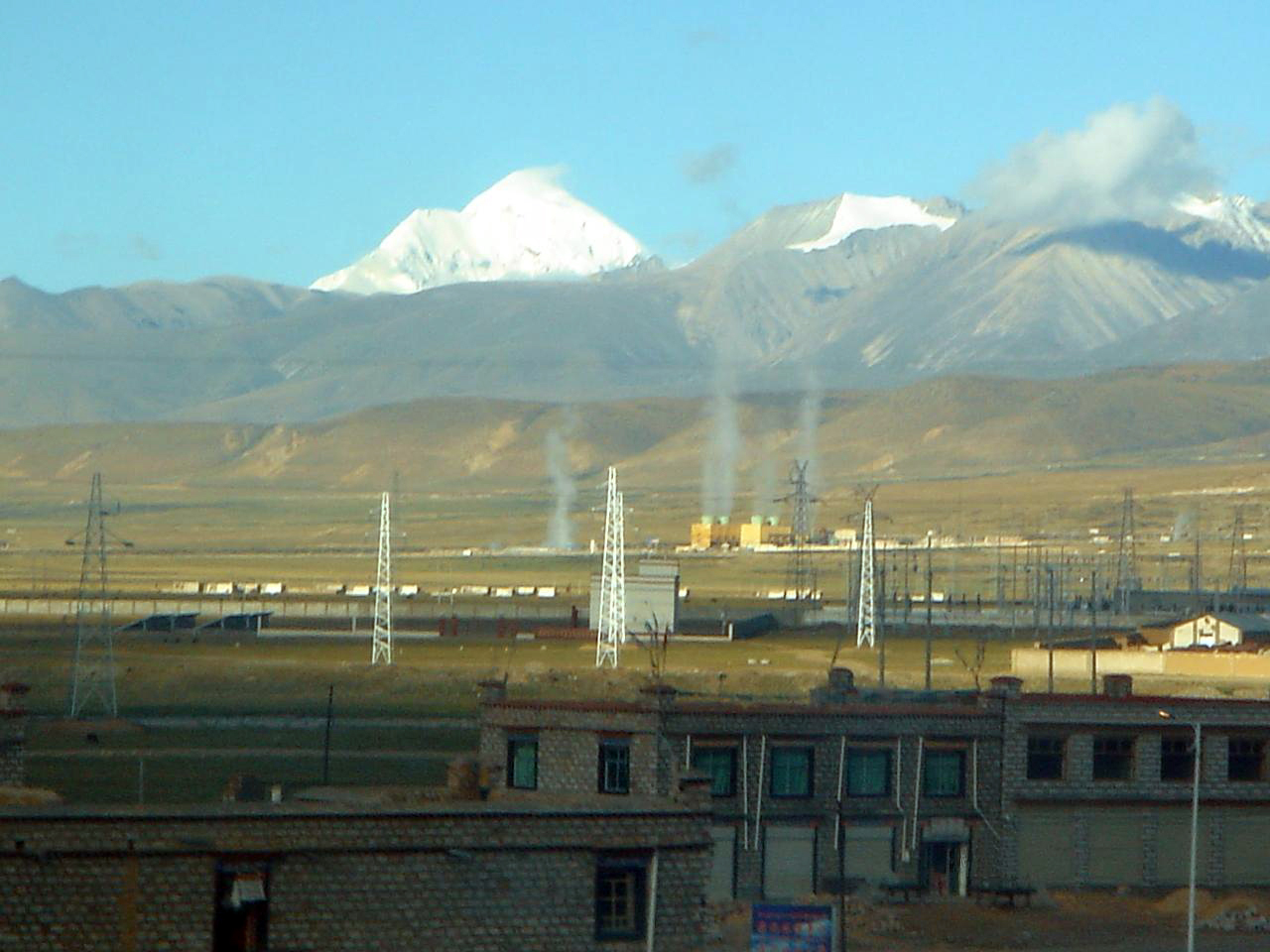
- Yangbajain Geothermal Power Station
- Country: China
- Status: operating
- Construction began: 1975
- Commission date: 1976
- Construction cost: RMB 200 million
- Operator: Tibet Electric Power Company

Yangbajain Geothermal Power Station of Tibet Electric Power Company or Yangbajain Geothermal Power Station, located in Yangbajain, Dangxiong County, Lhasa, Tibet Autonomous Region, China, is a branch of Tibet Electric Power Company.

== History ==
In the early 1970s, a geological exploration team came to the Yangbajain area and found hot springs emitting heat. Since then, the construction of the Yangbajain Geothermal Experimental Power Station was gradually put on the agenda.

In 1975, the State Council of the People's Republic of China listed the geothermal development of Yangbajain as a key project of the national 5th "Five-Year Plan". The state has allocated more than 200 million RMB. The Third Geological Brigade of Tibet used core drilling to successfully drill China's first wet steam well in Yangbajain. A group of people from Tsinghua University conductede experiments with a 300-kilowatt unit here, and on September 23, 1975, the Qinghai-Tibet Plateau Scientific Research Team of the Chinese Academy of Sciences and the Third Geological Brigade of Tibet cooperated in installing a 300-kilowatt geothermal experimental unit to generate electricity successfully. The People's Government of Tibet Autonomous Region then set up the "Geothermal Engineering Command Department" and the "Nine-23 Engineering Department", and began to develop the No. 1 machine. In 1976, the first megawatt-class geothermal generating unit generated electricity here, and entered the industrial power generation. In October 1977, the first 1,000-kilowatt test unit of Yangbajain Geothermal Experimental Power Station generated electricity and was put into operation.

In 1984, the expansion of Yangbajain Geothermal Power Station and Power Transmission and Transformation Project, invested and supported by Southwest Electricity Administration, was installed as one of the 43 Aid Projects to Tibet. In 1985, Li Peng, the Vice Premier of the State Council of the People's Republic of China, visited the Yangbajain Geothermal Power Plant, which had an installed capacity of 10 megawatts in that year, and sent power to Lhasa via a 110 kV transmission line.

By the end of 2006, the installed capacity had reached 24,180 kilowatts, and it was already the largest geothermal power plant in China, with an annual generation capacity of 109.7 million kilowatt-hours and a cumulative generation capacity of 1.84 billion kilowatt-hours. Yangbajain Geothermal Power Plant is currently the largest geothermal test base in China and the only power plant in the world that utilizes medium-temperature shallow thermal storage resources for industrial power generation. By around 2007, China's installed geothermal power generation capacity ranked 12th in the world, and the Tibet Autonomous Region's installed geothermal power generation capacity ranked 1st in China.

On May 18, 2008, invested by China Guodian Corporation Longyuan Power Group Co., Ltd. and constructed by Yangbajain Geothermal Power Plant, the "Geothermal Power Generation Demonstration Project of Yangbajain Twin-Screw Expansion Power Plant in Tibet" started construction, with an installed capacity of a 1,000-kilowatt geothermal power generator set. The generator belongs to the new equipment of geothermal power generation, which had been listed as the national "863" Program.

== See also ==
- Yangbajain Geothermal Field
