= Duilong River =

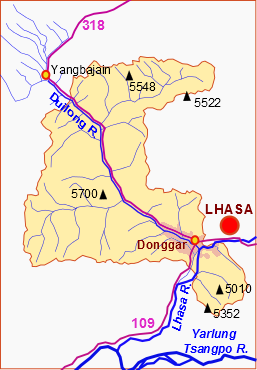
- Sketch map of the Duilong River and Doilungdêqên District

Location
- Country: Tibet
- Location: Damxung County, Doilungdêqên District, Lhasa

Physical characteristics
- Mouth
  - coordinates: 29.619711°N 91.010815°E
- Length: 137 km (85 mi)
- Basin size: 4,988 km^{2} (1,926 sq mi)

Basin features
- River system: Lhasa River

The Duilong River, or Duilong Qu (Toelung, Tibetan: སྟོད་ལུང་ཆུ, Wylie: stod lung chu; Chinese: 堆龙河), is a right tributary of the Lhasa River, which it enters just below the city of Lhasa, Tibet, China. The river is about 137 kilometres (85 mi) in length. Water quality may be compromised by dissolved substances including arsenic from geothermal springs.

== Course ==
The Duilong is the largest tributary of the Lhasa River, with a length of 137 kilometres (85 mi) and a basin area of 4,988 square kilometres (1,926 sq mi). The valley of the Duilong River leads south to the Lhasa River, and is contained by two ridges of the Nianqing Tanggula Mountains. The Duilong has hydro-electrical power generation capacity of 4,000 KW. The non-monsoon season lasts from October to May each year, and the monsoon season from June to October. 80% of the precipitation is in the monsoon season, when warm and moist air is transported to the Tibet Plateau from the south Indian Ocean.

The Qinghai–Tibet Railway approaches Lhasa from the northwest. It descends from the Amdo grasslands to Nagchu and Damshung, and then follows the Toelung River from Yangpachen through Toelung Dechen county into west Lhasa. A new railway bridge was built over the Lhasa river to link the station in Liuwu township on the south side of the river to central Lhasa on the north side.

== Water quality ==
The southern Tibetan Plateau is tectonically active, and contains many geothermal springs. Although rivers in Tibet are generally considered to be clean, the water of the Duilong is affected by these springs. A 2015 study reported that during the non-monsoon season the levels of arsenic in the river, at 205.6 μg/L were higher than the WHO guideline of 10 μg/L for drinking water. The source of the pollution seems to be untreated water from the Yangbajain Geothermal Field power station. It can be detected 90 kilometres (56 mi) downstream from this site.

== Yangjinshi Reservoir ==
A 1995 paper concluded that proposed Yangjinshi Reservoir would provide a good balance between the conflicting demands for irrigation and hydroelectric power generation. It could not be built in the lower reaches, where the river is paralleled by the Qinghai-Xizang Road, or in the middle reach where it would cover the Yangbajain geothermal field. The chosen location was therefore upstream, controlling a catchment area of 1,580 square kilometres (610 sq mi) with an annual normal runoff of 394,000,000 cubic metres (1.39×10^{10} cu ft). If the water level were maintained at 4,360 metres (14,300 ft) above sea level, the reservoir would have a capacity of 81,000,000 cubic metres (2.9×10^{9} cu ft) including available storage of 19,000,000 cubic metres (670,000,000 cu ft). The project would include a 4500 kW power station.

== Sources ==
- "China Strives to Complete Gormo-Lhasa railroad by October". Central Tibetan Administration. 2005-04-16.
- Ge, Le; Li, Tao (1996). "Rural Urbanization in China's Tibetan Region: Duilongdeq County as a Typical Example" (PDF). Chinese Sociology and Anthropology. 28 (4).
- Li, Chaoliu; Kang, Shichang; Chen, Pengfei; Zhang, Qianggong; Mi, Jue; Gao, Shaopeng; Sillanpää, Mika (2013). "Geothermal spring causes arsenic contamination in river waters of the southern Tibetan Plateau, China". Environmental Earth Sciences. 71 (9).
- Shen, Dajun (July 1995). "Research on the rational use of water resources on the Lhasa River, Tibet" (PDF). Modelling and Management of Sustainable Basin-scale Water Resource Systems (Proceedings of a Boulder Symposium). IAHS.
- Ye, Aizhong; Duan, Qingyun; Zeng, Hongjuan; Li, Lin; Wang, Caiyun (September 2010). "A Distributed Time-Variant Gain Hydrological Model Based on Remote Sensing" (PDF). Journal of Resources and Ecology. 1 (3).
- Zhang, Tianhua; Huang, Qiongzhong (1997). "Pollution of Geothermal Wastewater Produced by Tibet Yangbajin Geothermal Power Station". Acta Scientiae Circumstantiae. Archived from the original on 2015-02-10.
