= Pangduo Hydro Power Station =

Hydropower station in Tibet, China

- Location within Tibet
- Official name: Chinese: 旁多水电站
- Country: China
- Location: Pundo Township, Lhünzhub County, Lhasa, Tibet Autonomous Region
- Coordinates: 30.183°N 91.353°E
- Purpose: Hydroelectric, irrigation
- Status: Active
- Construction began: 2008
- Opening date: 2013

Dam and spillways
- Type of dam: Embankment, rock-fill
- Impounds: Lhasa River
- Height (foundation): 158 metres (518 ft)
- Length: 1,073 metres (3,520 ft)

Reservoir
- Total capacity: 1,170,000,000 cubic metres (4.1×10^{10} cu ft)
- Normal elevation: 4,100 metres (13,500 ft)

Power Station
- Commission date: 10 December 2013
- Turbines: 4 x 40 MW
- Installed capacity: 160 MW
- Annual generation: 599 GWh (million kilowatt hours)

The Pangduo Hydro Power Station (Chinese: 旁多水电站; also called the Pondo Hydro Power Station) is a reservoir and dam on the Lhasa River in Lhünzhub County to the east of Lhasa, Tibet Autonomous Region, China. The primary purposes are hydroelectric power generation and agricultural irrigation. Work started in 2008. The first turbine came into production in 2013 and the other three turbines in 2014. With annual generation capacity of 599 million kilowatt hours, it has been called the "Tibetan Three Gorges". Nevertheless, the comparison is hyperbole since the dam is only able to impound less than 1/30th that of Three Gorges (31.9 vs 0.97 million acre-feet).

== Description ==
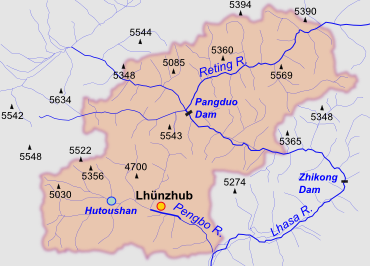
Lhünzhub County sketch map

The Pangduo Dam impounds the Lhasa River in Pondo Township of Lhünzhub County, about 63 kilometres (39 mi) from Lhasa. It is at an elevation of 13,390 feet (4,080 m) above sea level, upstream from the 100MW Zhikong Dam at 12,660 feet (3,860 m). The objectives included hydroelectric power generation, irrigation, flood prevention and water supply. Of these, power generation and irrigation are the main purposes. The dam is one of a series that China has built on the Brahmaputra and its tributaries, others being the Yamdrok Hydropower Station, Nyingtri-Payi and Drikong.

The rock-fill dam impounds 1,170,000,000 cubic metres (4.1×10^{10} cu ft) of water. It is planned to irrigate 435.2 square kilometres (168.0 sq mi) of agricultural land. The power station has total installed capacity of 160 MW, with four generating units. The potential annual generating capacity is 599 GWh (million kilowatt hours).

== Construction ==
The project involved a total investment of 4.569 billion yuan, or about 740 million US dollars, and has been called the "Tibetan Three Gorges". The dam and power station were built as part of the Western Development Strategy. Work started in 2008, and progressed on schedule. Damming of the river stream was completed in October 2011. The project included the world's deepest cut-off wall, at 158 metres (518 ft), with an axes length of 1,073 metres (3,520 ft). Construction of the wall was challenging, with glacial sediments underlying flood sediments. The construction team had to deal with the lack of oxygen at 4,100 metres (13,500 ft) above sea level and the cold weather.

The project was due to start operating its first generator in October 2013. The first generator set was supported by a computer monitoring system developed by the Beijing-based Institute of Water resources and Hydropower Research. The first generating unit started operation in December 2013, with annual generation capacity of 150 million kilowatt hours. The other three units were expected to come onstream in June 2014, bringing annual capacity to the total of 599 million kilowatt hours. Construction is expected to be completed in 2016.

== Sources ==
- Buckley, Michael (11 November 2014). Meltdown in Tibet: China's Reckless Destruction of Ecosystems from the Highlands of Tibet to the Deltas of Asia. St. Martin's Press. ISBN 978-1-137-47472-8.
- Chellaney, Brahma (25 July 2013). Water: Asia's New Battleground. Georgetown University Press. ISBN 978-1-62616-012-5.
- "China Valves Technology Receives Purchase Orders for Tibet Pangduo Hydro Project and South-to-North Water Diversion Project" (Press release). 14 June 2011.
- Guan, Steve (12 December 2013). "Tibet commences new hydropower plant". China Coal Resource.
- "IWHR Supplies Monitoring System for Pangduo Hydro Project". China Institute of Water resources and Hydropower Research. 14 February 2014.
- Press Trust of India (11 March 2013). "Dam in Tibet over Brahmaputra to be operational soon".
- Qin, Julia (10 May 2013). "Tibet key water-control project to be completed". China Tibet Online. Archived from the original on 5 February 2015.
- Sun, Vincent (28 September 2010). "Tibet's largest Pangduo Hydro Project builds world's deepest cutoff wall". China Tibet Online.
- "Tibet's biggest water-related project launched". China Tibet Online. 6 August 2009. Archived from the original on 12 August 2009.
- "Tibet's largest water project completes damming". China Tibet Online. 27 October 2011. Archived from the original on 29 October 2011.
- "'Tibet's Three Gorges Dam' starts operation". China Daily. 11 December 2013. Archived from the original on 6 February 2015.
