= Yangbajain Geothermal Field =

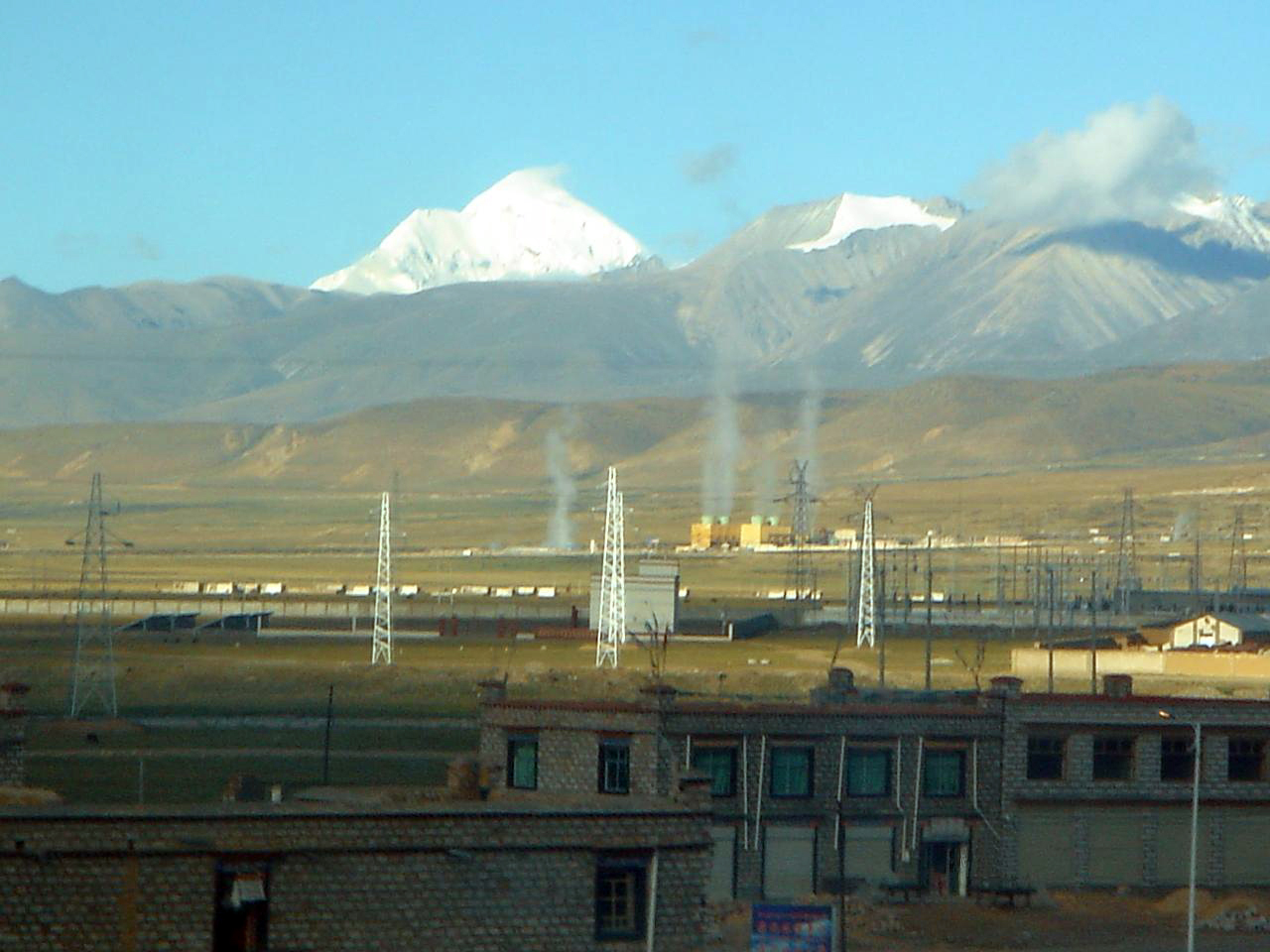
- Yangbajing geothermal power station
- Country: China
- Location: Yangbajain, Damxung County, Tibet Autonomous Region, China
- Coordinates: 30.097615°N 90.507219°E
- Commission date: 1977

Geothermal power station
- Type: steam turbo
- Wells: 8

Power generation
- Nameplate capacity: 25.2 MW
- Annual net output: 100 GWh

The Yangbajain Geothermal Field (羊八井地热田) is a geothermal field near the town of Yangbajain in Damxung County, Tibet Autonomous Region, China. The fluid is heated by magmatic activity not far below the surface. It is a tourist attraction and also supplies steam to a major power plant with 25 MW capacity.

== Location ==
The Yangbajain geothermal field is in a plateau basin on the southern slopes of the Nyainqentanglha Mountains, near to the Qinghai–Tibet Highway (China National Highway 318) in Damxung County. The Qinghai–Tibet Railway, which terminates in Lhasa, also passes through Yangbajain. The field covers 40 square kilometres (15 sq mi). It delivers natural thermal energy at the ground surface of up to 107,000 kilocalories per second. Yangbajain Geothermal Field is currently the largest proven geothermal field of its nature in China. It has an estimated power generation potential of 150,000 kW.

== Geology ==
The Yangbajing Basin lies between the Nyainquentanglha Range to the northwest and the Yarlu-Zangbo suture to the south. The geothermal field is in the central part of a semi-graben fault-depression basin caused by the foremontane fault zone of the Nyainqentanglha Mountains. The SE-dipping detachment fault began to form about 8 Ma. (Note: Ma – Million years ago) Most of the outcropped rocks are metamorphosed lower Paleozoic rocks, Paleogene volcano-clastic rock series, Neogene conglomerates and loose sediment accumulations from the Quaternary. The fault structures in the region run NE, NW, and nearly N-S. The NE faults are the largest and oldest, and usually have been cut by later fractures and faults. Although there still seems to be frequent magmatic activity, the main stages of magmatic intrusion were the Yanshanian granitic intrusion (88.7 Ma), the Yanshanian dioritic intrusion (88.0 Ma), and the Later Himalayan granitic intrusion (29.7 Ma).

The field is part of the Himalayan Geothermal Belt in the Lhasa-Gangdise terrane. The geothermal reservoir is basically a Quaternary basin underlaid by a large granite batholith. The basin has been filled with glacial deposits from the north and alluvial-pluvial sediments from the south. Fluid flows horizontally into the reservoir through the faults around the basin. A drill hole in the northern part of the field with a final depth of 2,006 metres (6,581 ft) found thermal fluid with a maximum temperature of 329 °C (624 °F).

Chemical analysis of the thermal fluid indicate that there is shallow-seated magmatic activity not far below the geothermal field. Other evidence, however, indicates that if there is a magmatic heat source vertically below the field, it must be over 15 kilometres (9.3 mi) below. A 1996 paper proposed that the magmatic heat source lies to the southeast of the field at a depth of 10 to 12 kilometres (6.2 to 7.5 mi). In the area north of the highway, thermal fluids from this depth rises through a deep fault to the surface. In the area south of the highway, thermal fluid in the surface zone is heated by mixing with fluids that in turn are heated by deep circulation near the magmatic heat source. Carbon dioxide in the hot spring gases is probably largely organic, from the sedimentary rocks of the field.

A 2000 paper presented evidence for a shallow reservoir with temperatures up to 165 °C (329 °F), and a deep reservoir with temperatures up to 329 °C (624 °F). The deep reservoir included an upper section between 950 and 1,350 metres (3,120 and 4,430 ft) deep and a lower and hotter section below 1,850 metres (6,070 ft). Both the upper and lower reservoirs contained sodium chloride thermal water. The shallow reservoir covers 148 square kilometres (57 sq mi) and is mostly hosted in porous Quaternary alluvium. Its basement is Himalayan granite and tuff. The water is a mixture of cold groundwater and deep thermal water. The deep reservoir was thought to have an area of 3.8 square kilometres (1.5 sq mi) below 750 metres (2,460 ft), contained in fractured bedrock. The thermal water is held in tectonic fissures and fracture zones. The isotopic composition of the thermal waters indicates local meteoric origin (rain and snow), including run-off from the Nyainquentanglha Range. The water runs down through the fractured rock, and is gradually warmed, with the warmer water rising towards the surface.

== Recreational use ==
Yangbajing has been called "the highest-altitude hot springs in the world." It includes hot springs and boiling springs, geysers and hot water lakes. Various facilities for tourists have been developed in the field. A resort developed by government agencies in 1998 has hot spring baths that are reputed to have curative powers. There are two warm indoor pools and an outdoor pool where tourists can relax in spectacular mountain surroundings. A 7,300 square metres (79,000 sq ft) hot water lake lies to the east of the geothermal ground, from which steam rises high in the air on a clear day. The lake is 15.5 metres (51 ft) deep, with water temperatures of 49 to 57 °C (120 to 135 °F). The local people have made pools for bathing in the west of the lake. The geothermal field is also used to operate greenhouses.

== Power plant ==
The Yangbajain Geothermal Station was established in 1977. It is the first geothermal power station to be built in Tibet and is the largest geothermal steam power plant in China. 4,000 kW of electricity from Yangbajain began to be delivered to Lhasa in 1981 along a transmission line that runs southeast along the Duilong River. It was the main source of power for Lhasa until the Yamdrok Hydropower Station came into operation in 1998. The highest temperature inside the drilling hole is 125.5 °C (257.9 °F). By the end of 2000 eight steam turbo generators had been installed at the Yangbajain Geothermal Station, each with capacity of 3 MW, giving a total of 25 MW. The geothermal field delivers 25.181 MW, or 100 GWh annually, to the city of Lhasa to the south. As of 2000 the Yangbajing power plants were using 1,200 tons per day of water from the shallow reservoir, but pressure was falling fast and the turbines could not operate at full capacity. Deeper wells were being drilled to tap into lower-lying thermal fluid.

== Pollution ==
Although rivers in Tibet are generally considered to be clean, the water of the Duilong River is not. A 2015 study reported that during the non-monsoon season the levels of arsenic in the river, at 205.6 μg/L were higher than the WHO guideline of 10 μg/L for drinking water. The source of the pollution seems to be untreated water from the Yangbajain Geothermal Field power station. It can be detected 90 kilometres (56 mi) downstream from this site.

== Sources ==
- An, Caidan (2003). Tibet China: Travel Guide. China Intercontinental Press. ISBN 978-7-5085-0374-5.
- "Damxung Mineral Resources" (in Chinese). Land and Resources Information Center of Tibet Autonomous Region.
- Dor, Ji; Zhao, Ping (2000). "Characteristics and Genesis of the Yangbajing Geothermal Field, Tibet" (PDF). Proceedings World Geothermal Congress 2000. Kyusho - Tohoku, Japan.
- "Geography". Embassy of the People's Republic of China in the Russian Federation. 2004-03-01.
- Harrison, T.M. (2006-01-01). "Did the Himalaya Extrude from Beneath Tibet?". Channel Flow, Ductile Extrusion and Exhumation in Continental Collision Zones. Geological Society of London. ISBN 978-1-86239-209-0.
- Li, Chaoliu; Kang, Shichang; Chen, Pengfei; Zhang, Qianggong; Mi, Jue; Gao, Shaopeng; Sillanpää, Mika (2013). "Geothermal spring causes arsenic contamination in river waters of the southern Tibetan Plateau, China". Environmental Earth Sciences. 71 (9).
- Shen, Xianjie (1996-12-01). Crust-Mantle Thermal Structure and Tectonothermal Evolution of the Tibetan Plateau. VSP. ISBN 90-6764-223-1.
- Ueckermann, Hermann I. (2008). Geothermal Energy Research Trends. Nova Publishers. ISBN 978-1-60021-683-1.
- "Yangbajing". Ministry of Culture, P.R.China.
- Zhang, Ming-tao; Tong, Wei (1982). "The Hydrothermal Activities and Exploitation Potentiality of Geothermal Energy in Southern Xizang (Tibet)". Energy, Resources and Environment: Papers Presented at the First U.S.-China Conference on Energy, Resources and Environment, 7-12 November 1982, Beijing, China. Elsevier Science. ISBN 978-1-4831-3583-0.
- Zhang, Tianhua; Huang, Qiongzhong (1997). "Pollution of Geothermal Wastewater Produced by Tibet Yangbajin Geothermal Power Station". Acta Scientiae Circumstantiae. Archived from the original on 2015-02-10.
- Zheng, Mianping (1997). An Introduction to Saline Lakes on the Qinghai—Tibet Plateau. Springer Science & Business Media. ISBN 978-0-7923-4098-0.
