= Lhasa River =

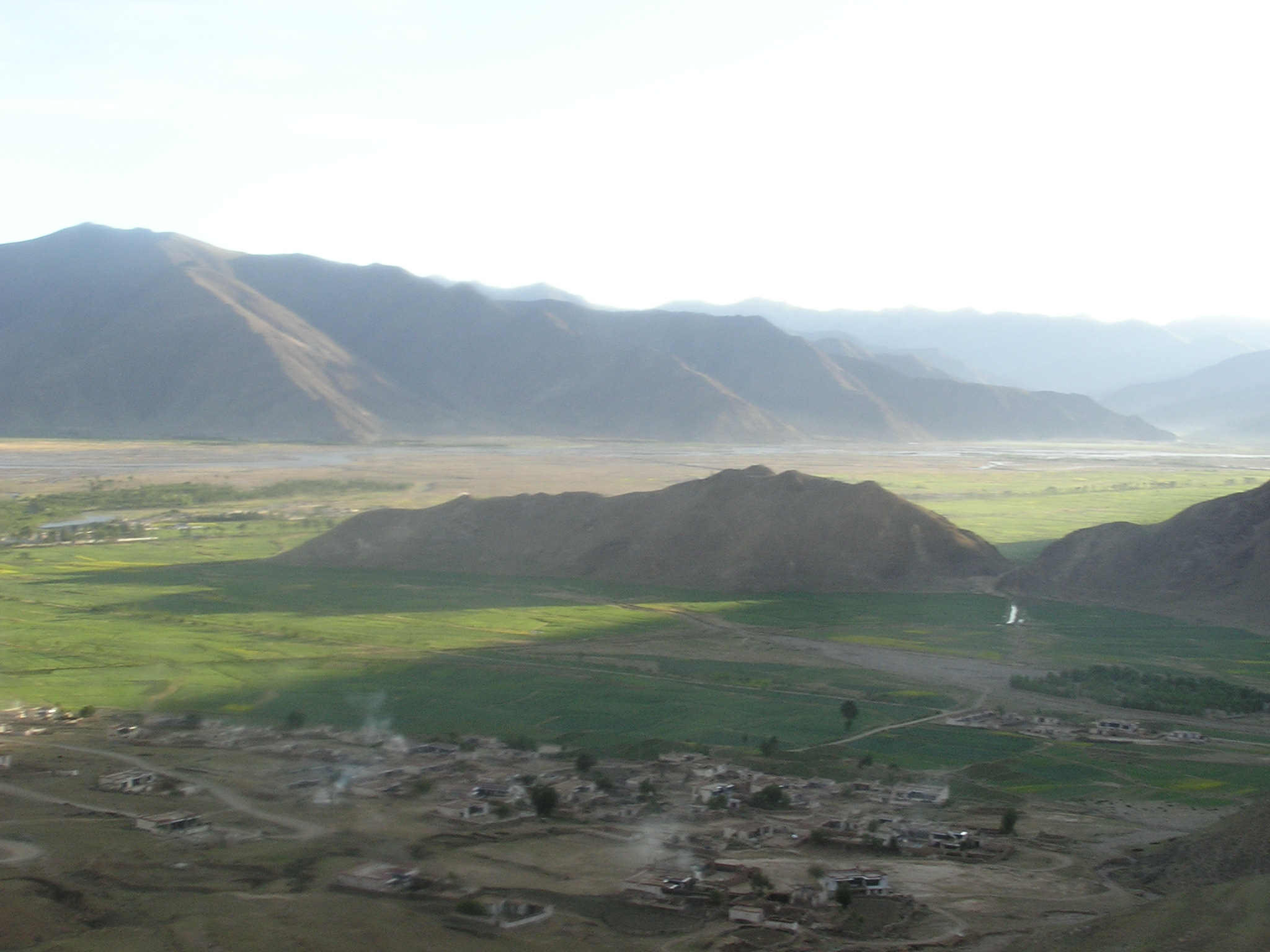
- Lhasa River near Ganden Monastery 1 (December 2006)

- Lhasa prefecture-level city
- Etymology: River of Felicity

Location
- Autonomous region: Tibet

Physical characteristics
- Source
  - location: Nyenchen Tanglha Mountains
  - coordinates: 30.1868°N 91.3448°E
  - elevation: 5,290 m (17,360 ft)
- Mouth
  - coordinates: 29°20′27″N 90°45′38″E
  - elevation: 3,590 m (11,780 ft)
- Length: 450 km (280 mi)
- Basin size: 26,000 km^{2} (10,000 sq mi)
- Discharge
  - average: 335 m^{3}/s (11,800 cu ft/s)

Basin features
- River system: Brahmaputra River
- Tributaries
  - left: Reting
  - right: Phak, Phongdolha, Pengbo, Duilong

The Lhasa River, also called Kyi Chu (Tibetan: སྐྱིད་ཆུ་, Wylie: sKyid chu, Chinese: 拉萨河; pinyin: Lāsà hé), is a northern tributary of the Yarlung Tsangpo River in the south of the Tibet Autonomous Region of China. The Yarlung Tsangpo is the upper section of the Brahmaputra River. The Lhasa River is subject to flooding with the summer monsoon rains, and structures have been built to control the floods. In its lower reaches the river valley is an important agricultural area. The city of Lhasa lies on the river. There are two large hydroelectric power stations on the river, the Zhikong Hydro Power Station (100 MW) and the Pangduo Hydro Power Station (160 MW)

== Basin ==
The Lhasa River drains an area of 32,471 square kilometres (12,537 sq mi), and is the largest tributary of the middle section of the Yaluzangbu River. The average altitude of the basin is around 4,500 metres (14,800 ft). The basin has complex geology and is tectonically active. Earthquakes are common. The river basin is the center of Tibet politically, economically and culturally. As of 1990 the population was 329,700, of whom 208,700 were farmers. 88% of the people were ethnic Tibetans.

The climate is semi-arid monsoon, with a low average temperature of 1.2 to 7.5 °C (34.2 to 45.5 °F). Average annual precipitation is 466.3 millimetres (18.36 in), with 85% falling in the June–September period. Annual runoff is 10,550,000,000 cubic metres (3.73×10^{11} cu ft). Water quality is good, with little discharge of sewage and minimal chemical pesticides and fertilizers. The basin has about 35,258 hectares (87,120 acres) of farmland, of which 17,710 hectares (43,800 acres) is irrigated. There are 1,850,000 hectares (4,600,000 acres) of grasslands that may be used for pasturage, and 100,000 hectares (250,000 acres) of forest.

== Course ==
The Lhasa River is the longest of the Yarlung Tsangpo tributaries. It flows through the south of the Tibet Autonomous Region of China, and is a left tributary of the Yarlung Tsangpo. It is about 450 kilometres (280 mi) long. The river forms where three smaller rivers converge. These are the Phak Chu, the Phongdolha Chu which flows from Damxung County and the Reting Tsangpo, which rises beyond the Reting Monastery. The highest tributary rises at around 5,290 metres (17,360 ft) on the southern slope of the Nyenchen Tanglha Mountains. (Note: The origin of the river was established at 30.3166685°N 90.4666668°E by the geologist Dieter Ortlam of Bremen on 14 August 1989 on a melting glacier at an altitude of 5,290 metres (17,360 ft) in the central Nyenchen Tanglha Mountains, about 15 kilometres (9.3 mi) south-west of the highest peak of 7,117 metres (23,350 ft), about 30 kilometres (19 mi) north of Yangbajain, and 15 kilometres (9.3 mi) east of the Guring La pass at 5,972 metres (19,593 ft). Another source places the origin in the Lhari County of Nagqu Prefecture. The largest tributary, the Reting Tsangpo, rises in Lhari County.) In its upper reaches the river flows southeast through a deep valley.

Lower down the river valley is flatter and changes its direction to the southwest, The river expands to a width of 150 to 200 metres (490 to 660 ft). Major tributaries in the lower reaches include the Pengbo River and the Duilong River. At its mouth the Lhasa Valley is about 3 miles (4.8 km) wide. It enters the Tsangpo at a point where that river makes a sharp turn to the south, and which therefore seems to be a continuation of the Lhasa River. The river is navigable from its mouth on the Yarlung Tsangpo up to the city of Lhasa and to altitudes of up to 2,650 metres (8,690 ft).

Intensive melting of snow and glaciers starts in May, contributing 20–30% of the water. The bulk of the water is supplied by the summer monsoon rains, which fall from July to September. There are floods in the summer from July to September, with about 17% of the annual runoff flowing in September. (Note: There is a meditation hollow at the Ani Tsankhung Nunnery in Lhasa that was used by Songtsän Gampo in the 7th century when he focused his spiritual energy on preventing the Lhasa River from flooding.) In winter the river has low water, and sometimes freezes. Total flow is about 4 cubic kilometres (0.96 cu mi), with average flow about 125 cubic metres per second (4,400 cu ft/s).

== Fish population ==
The Lhasa River has mean monthly water temperatures that range from about 1 to 14 °C (34 to 57 °F). Average water temperatures are 7.5 °C (45.5 °F). There are abundant species of fish that are adapted to the clear and cool water. The cool temperatures, with the upstream reaches above 4,000 metres (13,000 ft) freezing over at times, has the effect of delaying growth of fish such as Oxygymnocypris stewartii. The Tibetan plateau has thin air and clouds, which combined with the clear water gives strong illumination from a full moon. This may affect the fishes' circadian rhythm. In 2009 it was reported that fish caught in the lower reaches of the river had been decreasing slightly in size, probably due to increasing demand and construction of hydroelectric dams.

== Settlements ==
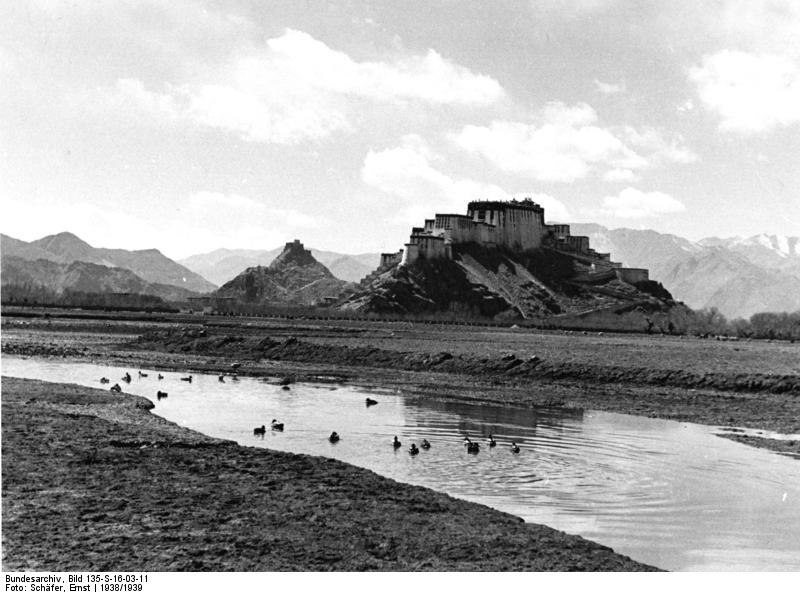
Potala Palace, Lhasa from the east (1938)

The river valley is one of the main agricultural areas of Tibet. The city of Lhasa lies on its shore, and there are many Buddhist monasteries in the valley. Riwo Ganden Nampar Gyelpé Ling, the first fortress of the Gelukpa sect, was built on the left bank in 1409, about 35 miles (56 km) upstream from Lhasa. In 1416 the monastery of Chödra Chenpo Penden Drepung was built on the right bank near to the Neudzong fortress. The ruins of the Sne'u rdzong fortress are on the left bank of the river, opposite the Norbulingka summer palace of the Dalai Lamas in Lhasa.

The climate in the central river valleys of Tibet is comparatively mild. They are warm in summer, and even in the coldest months of winter the temperature is above freezing on sunny days. A visitor described the valley around Lhasa in 1889 as follows,

The plain over which we are riding is a wonderfully fruitful one. It is skirted on the south by the Kyi river, and is watered, moreover, by another smaller stream from the north, which flows into the Kyi ... some five miles west of Lhasa. All this land is carefully irrigated by means of dikes and cross-channels from both rivers. Fields of buckwheat, barley, pea, rape, and lindseed lie in orderly series everywhere. The meadows near the water display the richest emerald-green pasturage. Groves of poplar and willow, in shapely clumps, combine with the grassy stretches to give in places a parklike appearance to the scene. Several hamlets and villages, such as Cheri, Daru, and Shing Dongkhar, are dotted over these lands. A fertile plain truly for a besieging army!

William Montgomery McGovern wrote in To Lhasa in Disguise (1924) that the right tributary of the Lhasa River, the Ti, (Note: By the "Ti" McGovern was presumably referring to the Duilong River, the Toelung in Standard Tibetan) which enters the river a few miles below Lhasa, was crossed by a very large and imposing bridge over a hundred yards long, with masonry piers and substantial stone embankments. McGovern also described the Yutok-sampa, or Turquoise Bridge, a structure with walls and a roof that crossed what had been the main Lhasa River but was now a stagnant canal. As late as 1984 kowas, yak hide boats similar to coracles, were being used to ferry passengers across the Lhasa River.

The Liuwu Bridge was constructed across the Lhasa River to link central Lhasa to Lhasa railway station on the south bank. The 1,600 metres (5,200 ft) bridge was completed in 2007. In 2010 there was a small hydroelectric power station. Prior to 2011, waste water from Lhasa was discharged untreated into the river. A waste water treatment plant designed to process 50,000 tons of sewage per day was commissioned in July 2011.

== Barrages ==
Before the Annexation of Tibet by the People's Republic of China, the agricultural engineer Peter Aufschnaiter designed a dam on the Lhasa River to protect the palace of Norbulingka in the city of Lhasa from flooding, with a water supply canal to the city. Heinrich Harrer monitored the work.

In 1948 Heinrich Harrer had to intervene to reinforce a dyke that protected the Norbulingka from inundations by the Lhasa River, which was 2 kilometres (1.2 mi) wide after the monsoon. Harrer directed a work crew of 500 soldiers and 1,000 laborers paid by the government of Tibet. A fleet of 40 Yak skin boats were used to carry granite blocks extracted from a quarry upstream of the Norbulingka. Harrer mentions some difficulties. The Tibetans did not work as hard as westerners, and would stop to help worms when they found them. There were several hundred women working on the site. The soldiers did not fail to make jokes with them, to which they responded promptly. The site was often visited by members of the Tibetan government, who would give out silk scarves, and rewards were distributed to the workers.

The total hydropower potential of the river basin is 2,560,000 kW. 83 medium and small hydroelectric plants had been built by 1989, delivering a total of 26,124 kW. Construction of the Zhikong Hydro Power Station in Maizhokunggar County began in May 2003. The reservoir is at an elevation of 12,660 feet (3,860 m) above sea level. The project cost 1.37 billion yuan. The dam impounds 225,000,000 cubic metres (7.9×10^{9} cu ft) of water. The 100 MW power station came into operation in September 2007.

The Pondo Water-Control Project dammed the Lhasa River in Lhünzhub County. Work started in 2008, and progressed on schedule. It is at an elevation of 13,390 feet (4,080 m) above sea level. The project includes a reservoir and a power station with potential annual generating capacity of 599 million kilowatt hours. The project, also called the Pangduo hydro project, impounds 1,170,000,000 cubic metres (4.1×10^{10} cu ft) of water. It is planned to irrigate 435.2 square kilometres (168.0 sq mi). Damming of the river stream was completed in October 2011. The project was due to start operating its first generator in October 2013. The project involved a total investment of 4.569 billion yuan, or about 0.74 billion US dollars, and has been called the "Tibetan Three Gorges". It was built as part of the Western Development Strategy. The dam also supports flood prevention and water supply.

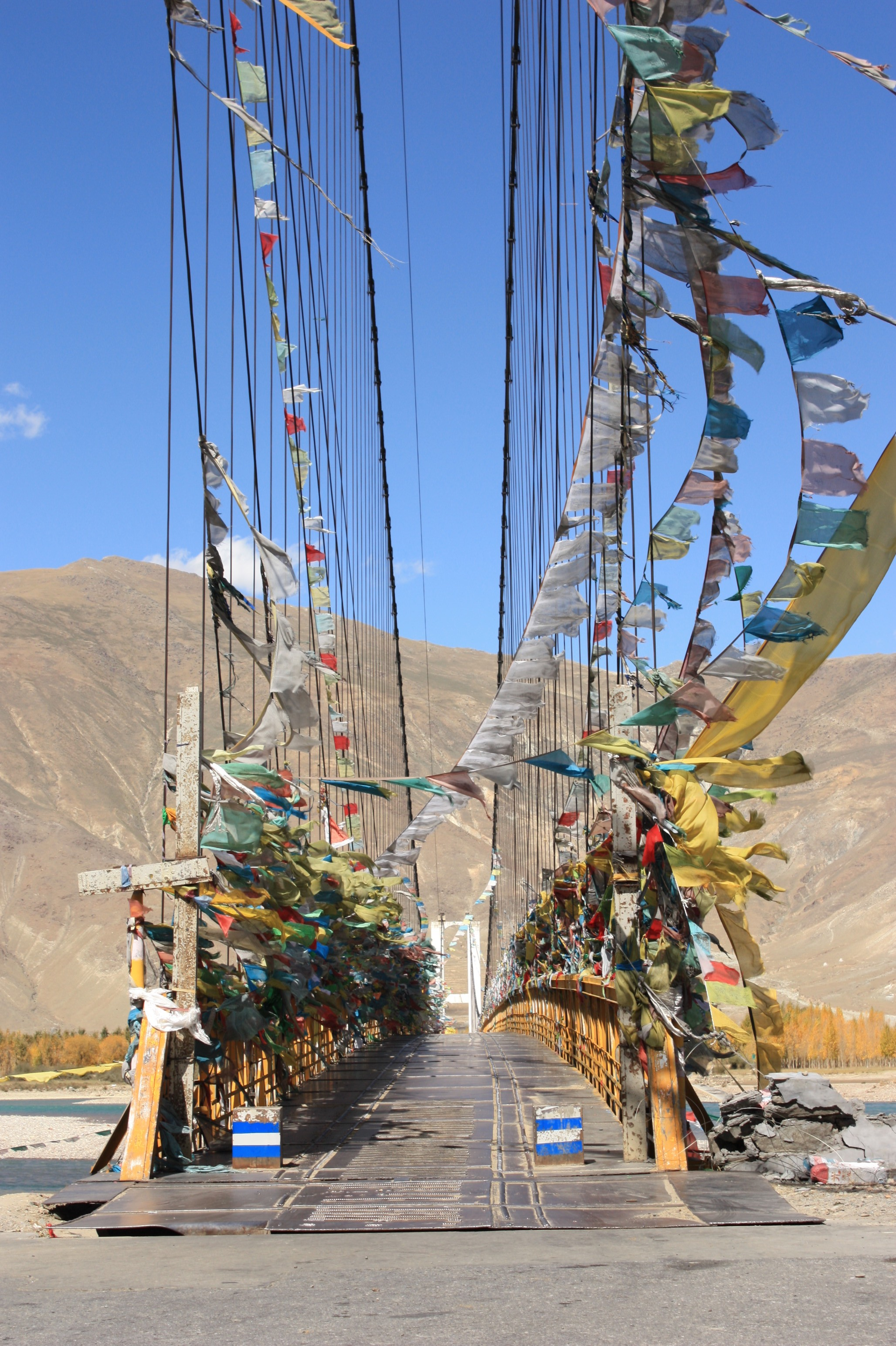
Dazi Bridge in Dagzê, completed in 1984

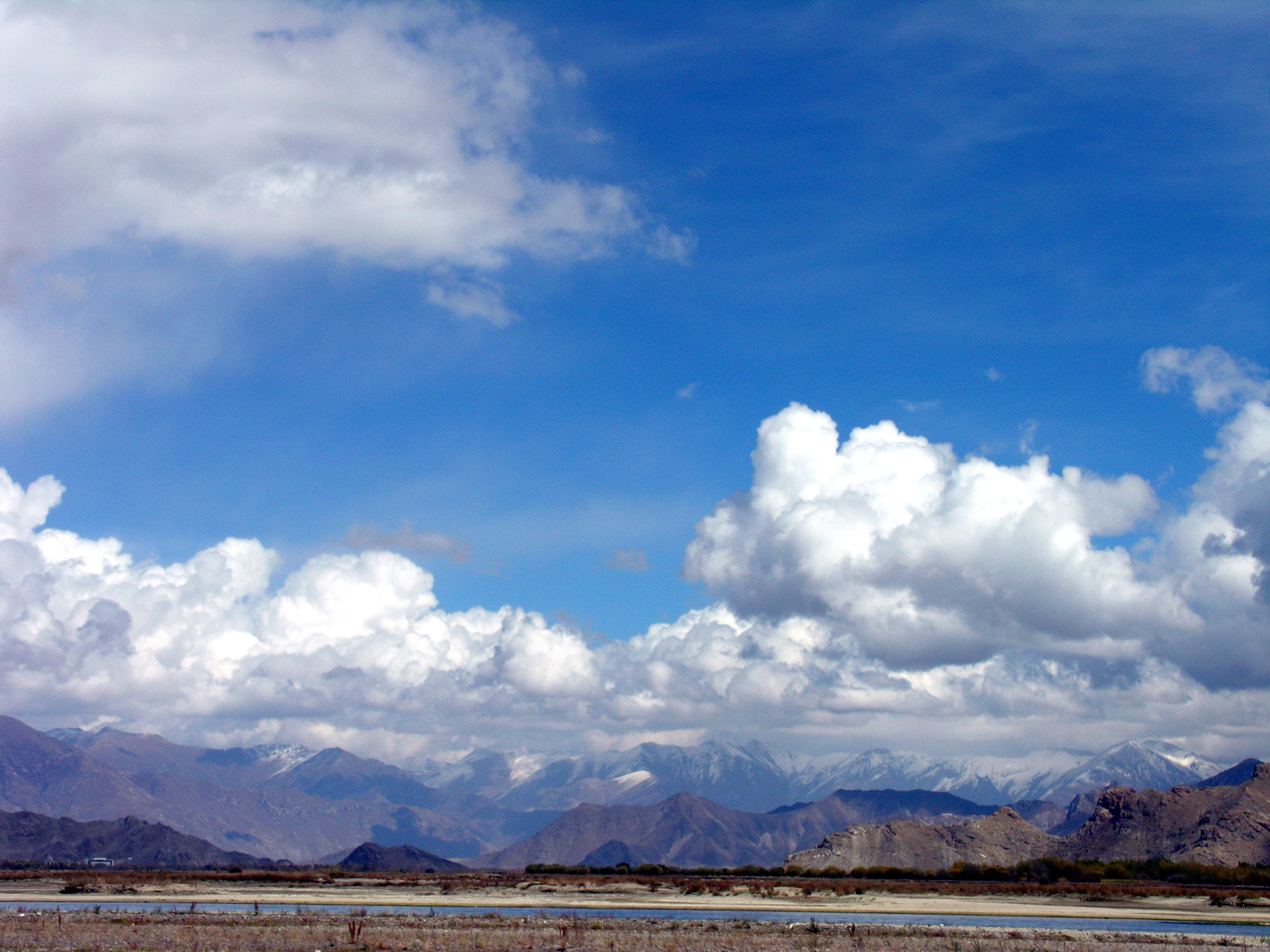
The flat river valley (2006)

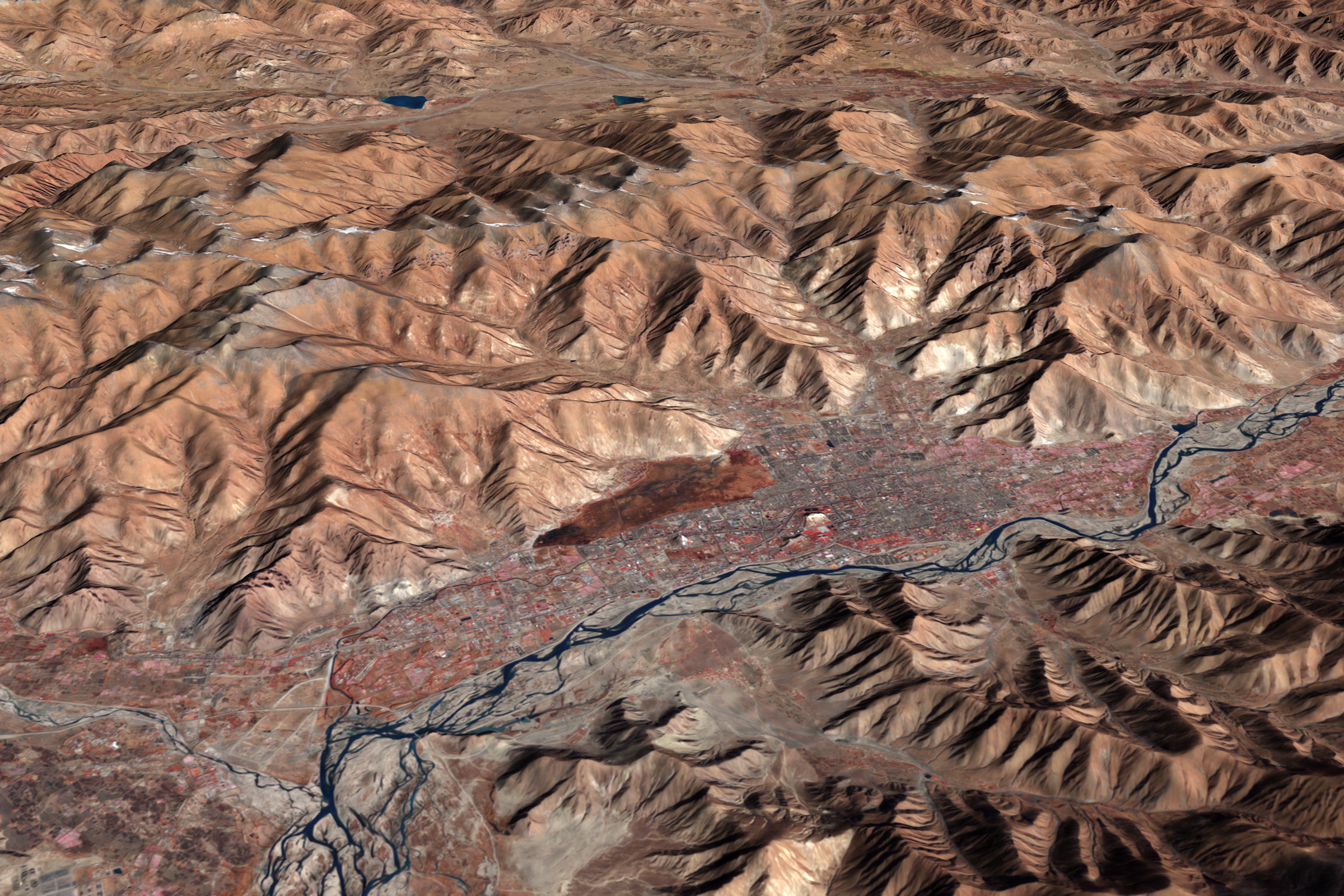
View from the air of the river running to the south of the city of Lhasa (2009)

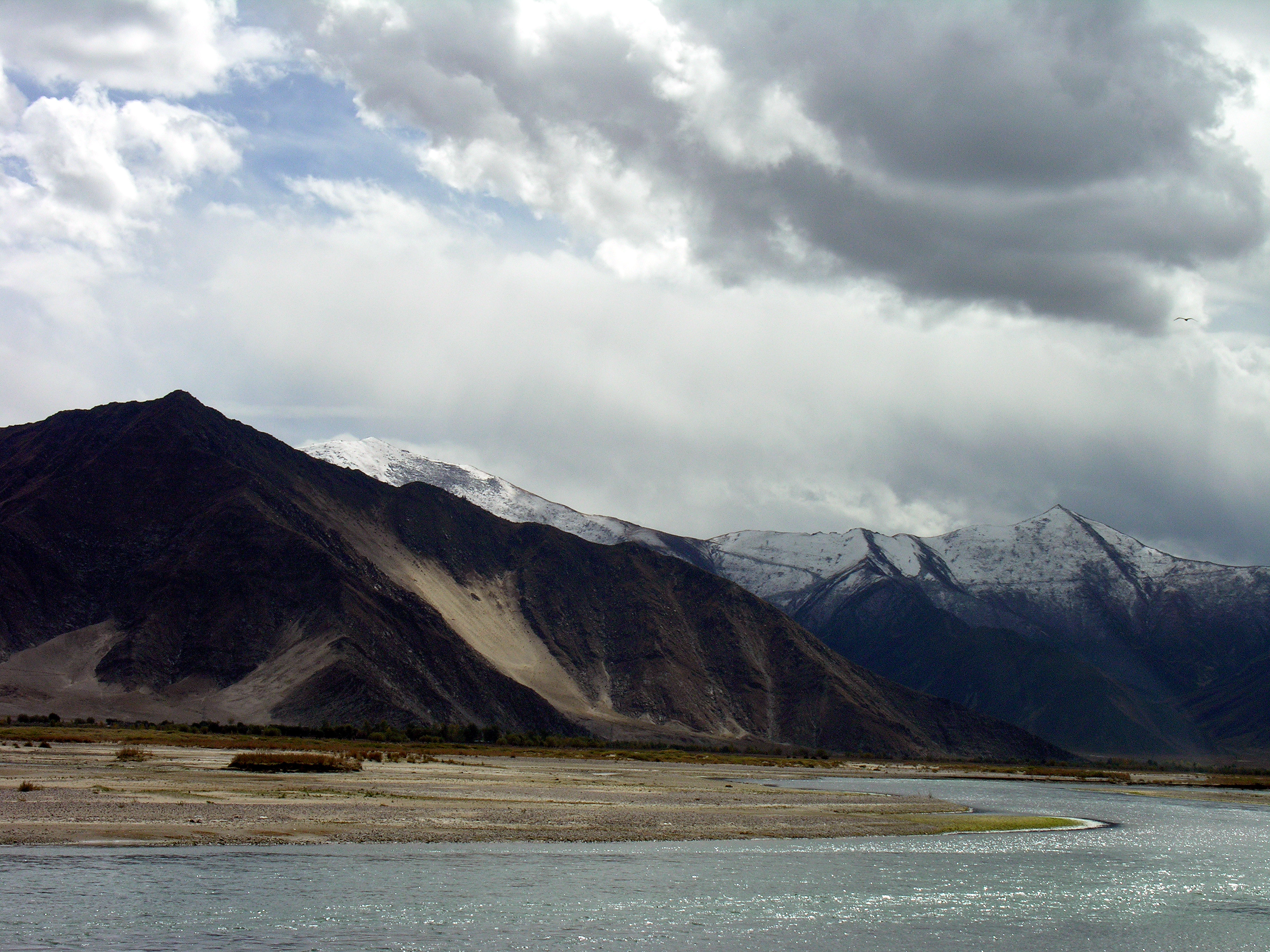
Lhasa River to the south of Lhasa (2008)

== Sources ==
- Bishop, Peter (25 July 2008). Bridge. Reaktion Books. ISBN 978-1-86189-469-4.
- Buckley, Michael (11 November 2014). Meltdown in Tibet: China's Reckless Destruction of Ecosystems from the Highlands of Tibet to the Deltas of Asia. St. Martin's Press. ISBN 978-1-137-47472-8.
- "Chine : fin de la construction de la première entreprise de traitement des eaux usées à Lhassa". Le Quotidien du Peuple en Ligne (in French). 15 July 2011.
- "Джичу". Большая советская энциклопедия (Great Soviet Encyclopedia) (in Russian). Советская энциклопедия. 1978.
- "Джичу". Географическая энциклопедия (Geographical Encyclopedia) (in Russian).
- Harrer, Heinrich (1954). Sept ans d'aventures au Tibet (in French). Translated by Henry Daussy. Arthaud. ISBN 2-7003-0427-6.
- "Hydroelectric Power Plants in China - Tibet". Platts UDI World Electric Power Plants Data Base. 3 October 2012.
- Kapstein, Matthew T. (5 June 2013). The Tibetans. John Wiley & Sons. ISBN 978-1-118-72537-5.
- Harrer, Heinrich (1997). Lhassa : le Tibet disparu (in French). text and photographs by Heinrich Harrer. Édition de La Martinière.
- Kelly, Margaret (2011). Fodor's China. Fodor's Travel Publications. ISBN 978-0-307-48053-8.
- "Liuwu Bridge is under construction". China Daily. 27 February 2007.
- McCue, Gary (2010). Trekking in Tibet: A Traveler's Guide. The Mountaineers Books. ISBN 978-1-59485-411-8.
- McGovern, William Montgomery (1924). To Lhasa In Disguise. Routledge. ISBN 978-1-317-84635-2.
- Noakes, David L. G.; Romero, Aldemaro; Zhao, Yahui; Zhou, Yingqi (18 November 2009). Chinese Fishes. Springer Science & Business Media. ISBN 978-90-481-3458-8.
- Ortlam, Dieter (1991). "Hammerschlag-seismische Untersuchungen in Hochgebirgen Nord-Tibets". Zeitschrift für Geomorphologie (in German). 35 (4). Berlin/Stuttgart: 385. Bibcode:1991ZGm....35..385O. doi:10.1127/zfg/35/1991/385.
- Press Trust of India (11 March 2013). "Dam in Tibet over Brahmaputra to be operational soon".
- 武振华 (1995). Place names of the Xizang autonomous region. Beijing. ISBN 7-80057-284-6.
- Qin, Julia (10 May 2013). "Tibet key water-control project to be completed". China Tibet Online. Archived from the original on 5 February 2015.
- Sandberg, Graham (1889). "The City of Lhasa". The Eclectic Magazine of Foreign Literature, Science, and Art. Leavitt, Trow & Company.
- Shen, Dajun (July 1995). "Research on the rational use of water resources on the Lhasa River, Tibet" (PDF). Modelling and Management of Sustainable Basin-scale Water Resource Systems (Proceedings of a Boulder Symposium. IAHS. Archived from the original (PDF) on 13 February 2015.
- "Tibet's biggest water-related project launched". China Tibet Online. 6 August 2009. Archived from the original on 12 August 2009.
- "Tibet's largest water project completes damming". China Tibet Online. 27 October 2011. Archived from the original on 29 October 2011.
- Tuttle, Gray; Schaeffer, Kurtis R. (2 April 2013). The Tibetan History Reader. Columbia University Press. ISBN 978-0-231-14469-8.
- Waddell, Laurence A. (1905). Lhasa and Its Mysteries: With a Record of the Expedition of 1903-1904. Cosimo, Inc. ISBN 978-1-60206-724-0.
- Zheng, Peng (24 September 2007). "Lhasa River Zhi Kong hydroelectric power station put into operation". China Tibet Information Center. Archived from the original on 6 February 2015.
