= Tatsag =

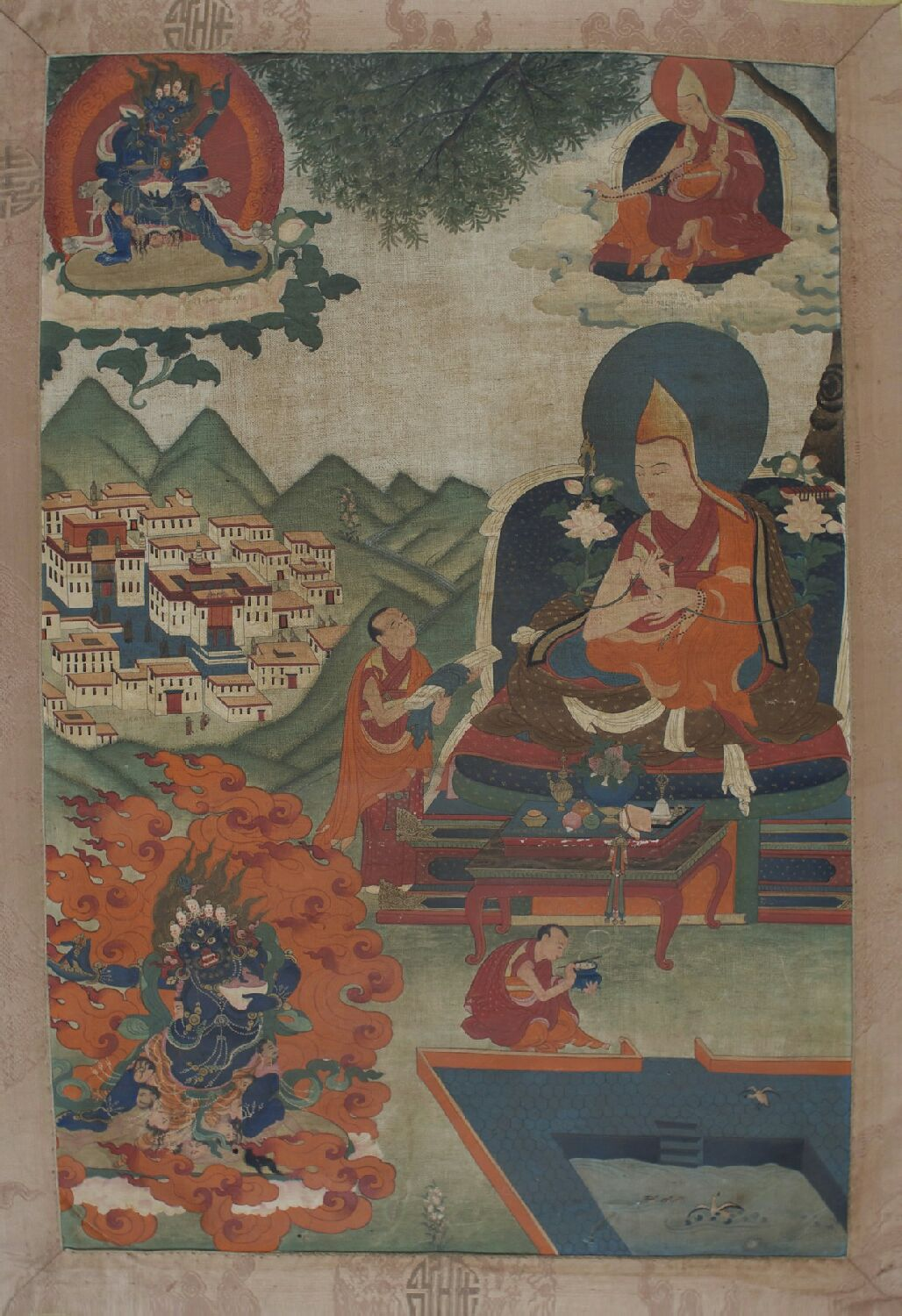
- Baso Chokyi Gyaltsen, 1st Tatsag
- Etymology: Buddhist incarnation lineage
- Origin: Baso Chokyi Gyaltsen (1402–73)

The Tatsag or Tatsak (Wylie: rTa-tshag) lineage is a Tibetan Buddhist reincarnation lineage whose first member was Baso Chokyi Gyaltsen (1402–73). Since 1794 the Tatsag has been the owner of the Kundeling Monastery in Lhasa. There has been some controversy over the representative of the lineage in recent years.

== Founder ==
Baso Chokyi Gyeltsen was the first member of the lineage, born to a noble family in Lato in 1402. His elder brother was Tsongkhapa Lobzang Drakpa's (1357–1419). He became a monk at an early age, and studied under Yongdzin Khedrub and Jampel Gyatso (1356–1428). He either founded or took over leadership of the monastery of Baso Lhundrub Dechen, and was given the title of Baso Choje, He was planning to move to Kashmir when he was appointed head of Ganden Monastery in 1463, where he stayed until his death in 1473.

== Early lineage ==
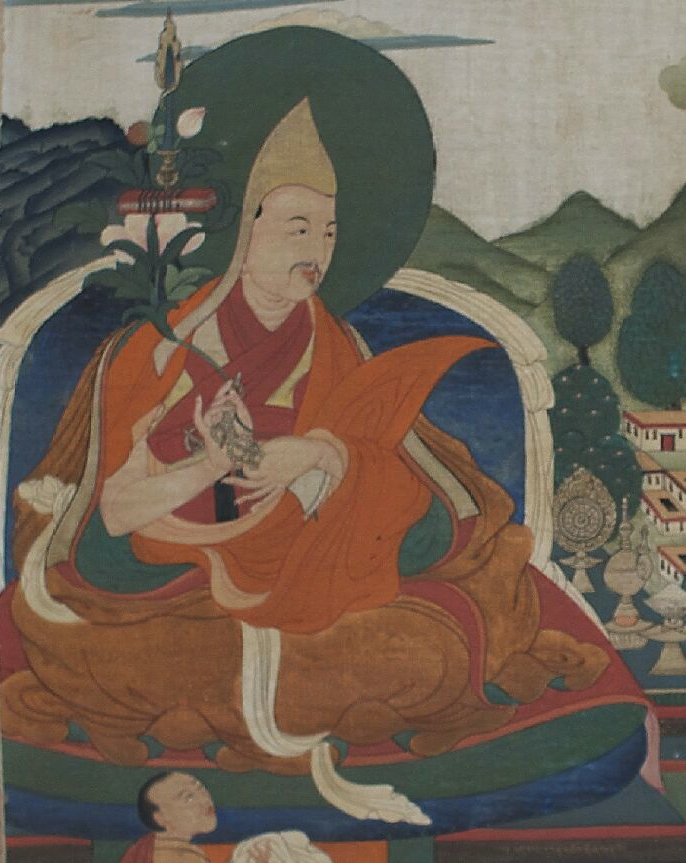
Ngawang Konchok Nyima, 6th Tatsag

A reincarnation of Baso Chokyi Gyeltsen was identified in Jedrung Lhawang Chokyi Gyeltsen (1537–1603). His reincarnation was in turn identified in Ngawang Chokyi Wangchuk (1606–52), called the 5th Tatsak Jedrung. At this time Wonpo Lhakyab (1474–1502), nephew of the First Pakpa Lha, was identified as having been the 2nd Tatsak. A fictional Liyul Chogyel (1509-1526) was invented as 3rd Tatsak. The early Tatsag lineage is:

Ordinal	Name	Life	Wylie transliterations	Monastery
1.	Baso Chokyi Gyaltsen	1402–73	Ba-so Chos-kyi rgyal-mtshan alias Pa-so Ch'ui-chi chia-le-ts'an	Lhanwa Sogon
2.	Jetsun Lhakyab	c. 1474–1508	lHa-skyabs (died at the age of 24)	Chamdo Jampa Ling
3.	Liyul Chokyi Gyalpo	1509–26	Gu-.na-shri alias Li-yul chos-rgyal	
4.	Lhawang Chokyi Gyaltsen	1537–1604	Ba-so lHa-dbang chos-kyi rgyal-mtshan alias Pa-so La-wang ch'ui-chi chia-le-ts'an	Kharsar Tashi Rabten
5.	Ngagwang Chokyi Wangchug	1606–52	Ba-so Ngag-dbang chos-kyi dbang-phyug alias L[recte: N!]a-wang ch'ui-chi wang-ch'u-k'o	
6.	Ngagwang Konchog Nyima	1653–1707	rTa-tshag (I) Ngag-dbang dkon-mchog nyi-ma ( alias Chi-lung hu-t'u-k'o-t'u A-wang kung-ch'ü yi-ma	Tatsag Lhundrub Dechen
7.	Lobzang Palden Gyaltsen	c. 1708/9–1758/9	rTa-tshag (II) Blo-bzang dpal-ldan (bstan-pa'i) rgyal-mtshan alias Luo-pu-sang pan-tien chien-ts'an alias Ji-lung shan-i wei-ch'üan tsu-shih (died in Peking aged 50)	Chagzam Tubten Ling

== Kundeling Monastery ==
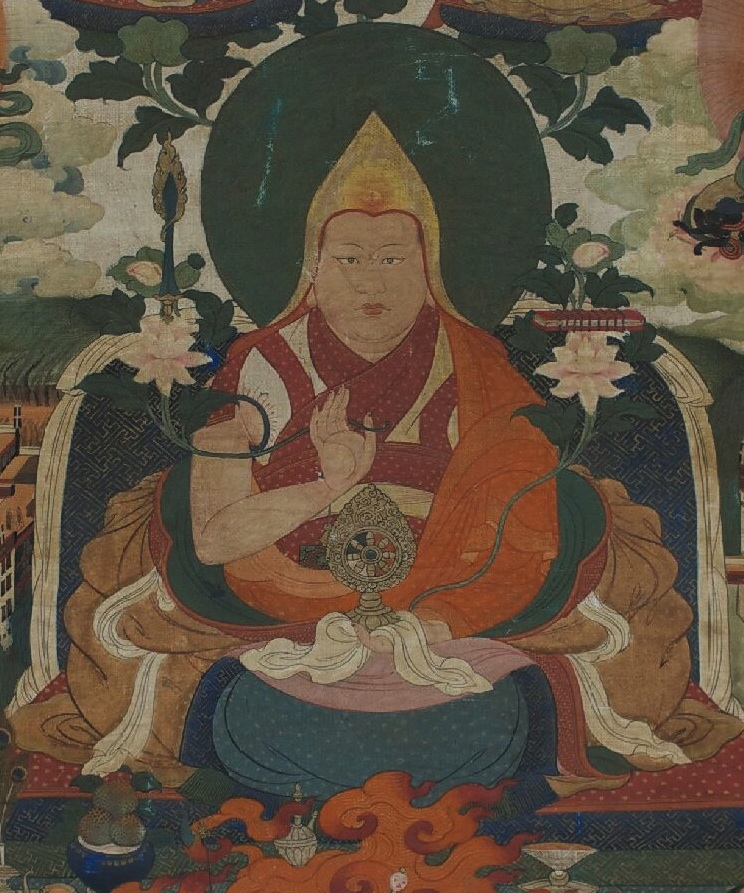
Yeshe Lobsang Tenpai Gonpo

The eighth incarnation, Yeshe Lobsang Tenpai Gonpo, was granted ownership of the Kundeling Monastery. A set of paintings in ground mineral pigment on cotton held by the Rubin Museum of Art depicts the first eight Talsags. It was probably created after the passing of the 8th Tatsag in 1810. The eighth and tenth members of the lineage served as regents of Tibet (1789–90, 1791–1811, 1875–86). Proprietors of the Kundeling monastery have been:

Ordinal	Name	Life	Wylie transliterations
8.	Gyaltsab Yeshe Tanpa'i Gonpo	(1760–1811)	rTa-tshag (III) Ba-so rje-drung qutuqtu Ye-shes blo-bzang bstan-pa'i mgon-po alias Yi-hsi luo-sang tan-pei kung-pu
9.	Ngagwang Lobzang Tanpa'i Gyaltsen	(1811–48)	rTa-tshag (IV) Ngag-dbang blo-bzang bstan-pa'i rgyal-mtshan alias Luo-pu-sang tan-pei chien-ts'an
10.	Ngagwang Palden Chokyi Gyaltsen	(1850/1854–86)	rTa-tshag (V) Ngag-dbang dpal-ldan chos-kyi rgyal-mtshan alias A-wang pan-tien ch'u-chi chien-ts'an
11.	Ngagwang Tubten Kalzang Tanpa'i Dronme	(1888–1918)	rTa-tshag (VI) Ngag-dbang thub-ldan skal-bzang sgron-me
12.	Lobzang Tubten Jigme Gyaltsen	(1924–56)	rTa-tshag (VII) Blo-bzang thub-bstan 'jigs-med rgyal-mtshan

== Thirteenth incarnation ==
The thirteenth member of the lineage as recognized by the Dalai Lama was Tenzin Chokyi Gyaltsen (bsTan-'dzin chos-kyi rgyal-mtshan), born about 1958. He fled to India in 1959. The 13th Tatsag Jedrung Hutuktu was found in Lhasa and was recognized after he moved to India. He became a well-known scholar. Tenzin Gyatso, the 14th Dalai Lama personally performed his ordination, hair cutting and naming ceremonies in the main temple of Dharamshala on 13 April 1993.

A parallel incarnation is recognized in Lhasa, Lobzang Yeshe Jampal Gyatso (Blo-bzang ye-shes. Lobzang Yeshe, born in 1959, was recognized by the Kundeling Labrang.

== Sources ==
- Gardner, Alexander (December 2009). "Baso Chokyi Gyeltsen". Treasury of Lives.
- Garratt, Kevin (2013-09-05). "Biography by Instalment". Religion and Biography in China and Tibet. Routledge. ISBN 978-1-136-11394-9.
- Karsten, Joachim G. (2000). "On the Monastic Archives of Kun-bde gling, Lhasa, Including a Preliminary Analytical Historical Study of the Monastery Itself (1794-1959/2000)". University of Bonn. Archived from the original on 2016-03-04.
- Watt, Jeff (August 2011). "Painting Set: Kundeling Incarnation Lineage". Himalayan Art.
