= Yeshe Lobsang Tenpai Gonpo =

Tibetan religious leader

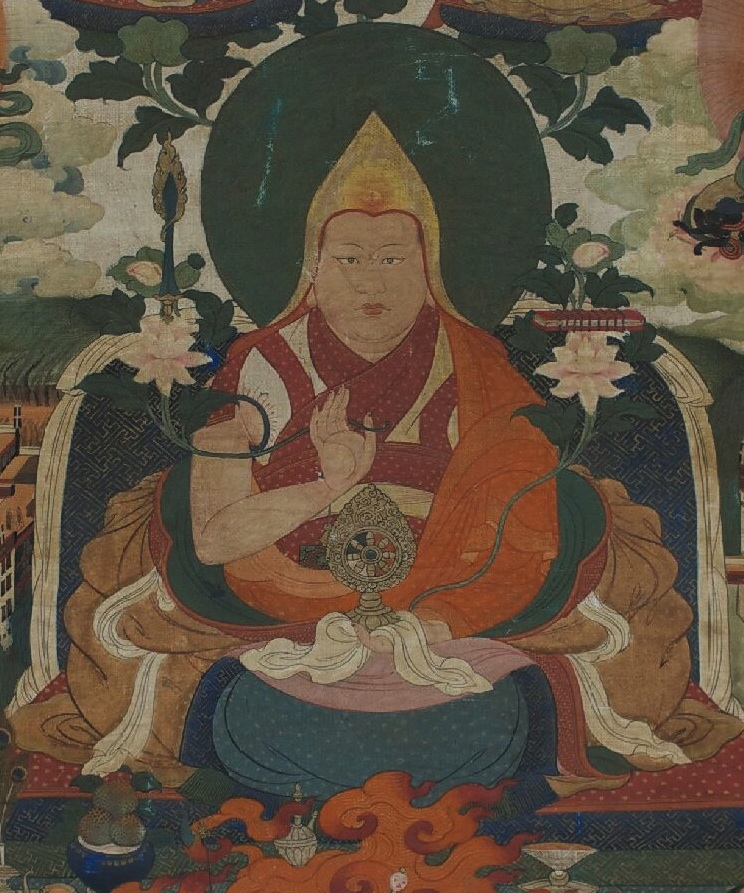
- Painting of the 8th Tatsag from c. 1810
- Born: 1760; Kham, Tibet
- Died: 30 December 1810 (aged 49–50)
- Other names: rTa-tshag Ba-so rje-drung qutuqtu Ye-shes blo-bzang bstan-pa'i mgon-po; rgyal tshab ye shes blo bzang bstan pa'i mgon po
- Occupation: Teacher (Lama)
- Known for: Regent of Tibet, 8th Tatsag

Yeshe Lobsang Tenpai Gonpo (Wylie: ye shes blo bzang bstan pa'i mgon po; 1760 – 30 December 1810) was the 8th Tatsag (rta tshag), a Tibetan reincarnation lineage. From 1789 to 1790 and from 1791 until his death in 1810 he was regent (desi) of Tibet, appointed by the Qing dynasty of China. He was the first owner of the Kundeling Monastery, founded in 1794 in Lhasa.

== Early life ==
Yeshe Lobsang Tenpai Gonpo was the eighth Tatsag incarnation and the third to take the name "Tatsag". He was born in 1760 in the Powo region of Kham. When he was aged five he was recognized as the reincarnation of the Seventh Tatsak Jedrung, Lobzang Pelgyen. The incarnation line had originated with Baso Chokyi Gyeltsen (1402–73), a disciple of Tsongkhapa Lobzang Drakpa. On being recognized he entered the Pasho (dPa'-shod) Monastery, founded in 1473 in Chamdo, Kham. He was enthroned and given a seal, diploma and tiara. From 1767 to 1771 he studied under Khenchen Zasak Pelden Drakpa, who granted him his lay vows.

In 1771 Tatsag went to study at the Kumbum Monastery in present-day Qinghai, a Gelug institution. He went on to Chengde, a summer palace of the Qing emperors that lay on the border between China and Mongolia. There he became close to Changkya Rölpé Dorjé (1717–86), from whom he received his novice vows and the name "Yeshe Tenpai Gonpo". In 1772 he visited Beijing, where the Qianlong Emperor received the boy in audience, gave him presents, and granted thirteen servants and the allowances of an official. The emperor treated Tatsag as his tham-ka bla-ma, or "lama of the seal", a high honor.

From 1774 Tatsag studied in Chengde under the abbot of the Tashilhunpo Monastery, Shartse Khenpo Nominhan Lobzang Jampel. When Lobsang Palden Yeshe, 6th Panchen Lama (1738–80) visited Chengde in 1780, the emperor presented Tatsag to him wearing a dragon robe. Tatsag traveled back to Lhasa in 1781–82, where he joined the Gomang faculty of Drepung Monastery and studied for the next eight years. One of his teachers was the 8th Dalai Lama, who ordained him in 1782. Tatsag was admitted into the monastic order the next year.

== Political leader ==
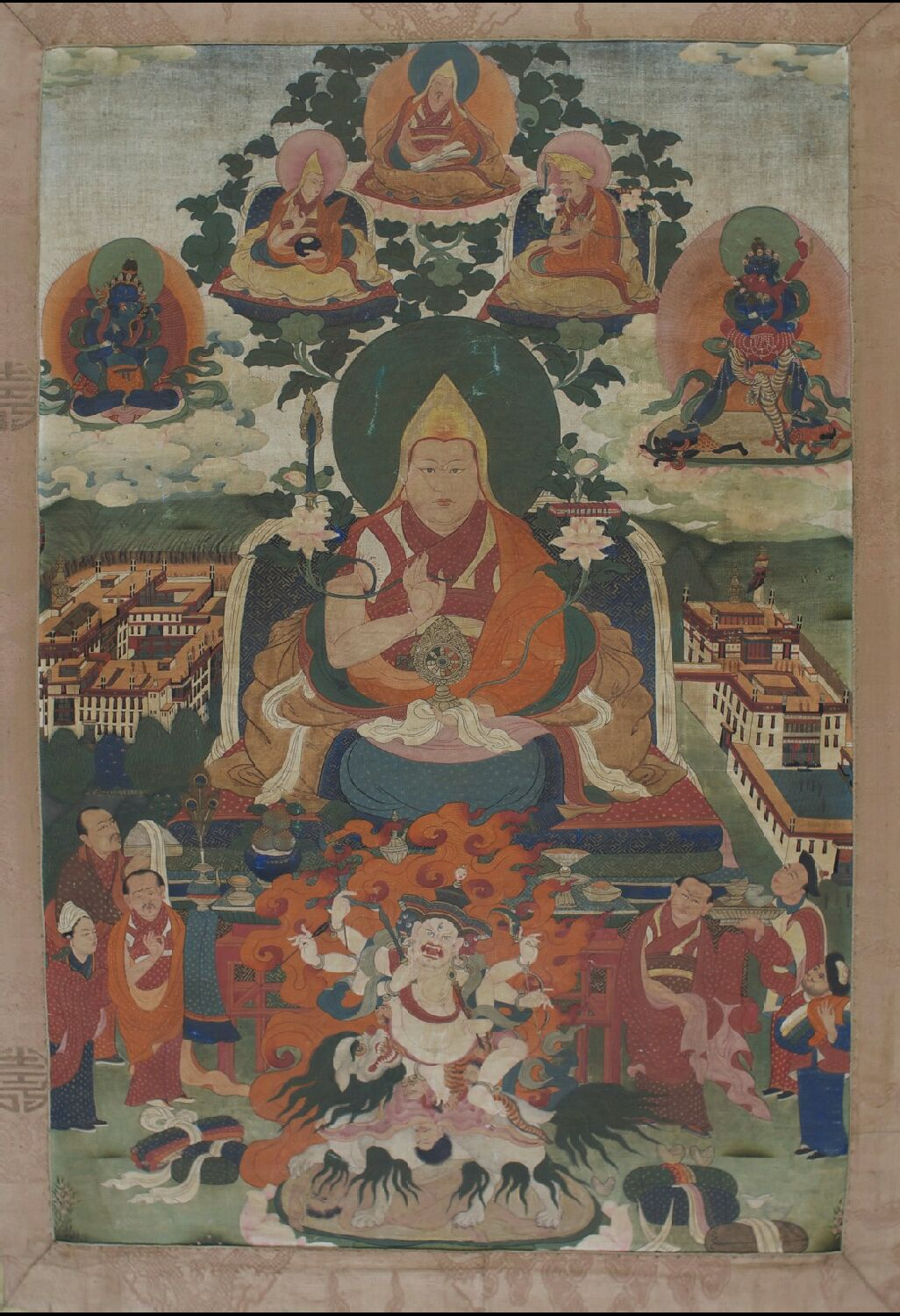
Portrait of the 8th Tatsag held by the Rubin Museum of Art

In 1786 Tatsag was among the Tibetans who congratulated the emperor on his birthday. That year he was appointed assistant to the Dalai Lama after the former regent had been recalled to Beijing. The Dalai Lama was of an age to rule alone, but the Qing rulers did not consider that he had the required skills and felt it was best for him to have a purely religious role. In 1788 the emperor gave Tatsag the title "lama of the seal" for the region of Dolonnor in Inner Mongolia, and called him to Beijing. While he was traveling to China in 1789 he received a command from the emperor to return to Lhasa and assume the regency. He was regent from 26 May 1789 to 28 September 1790. His mandate and the titles bestowed on him by the emperor indicate that he was in effect the Qing dynasty's first viceroy in Tibet.

On 28 September 1790 the emperor removed Tatsag from office and called him to Beijing, in an edict that said he had not been "diligent and careful" in handling the Dalai Lama's affairs. He was replaced by the previous regent, the First Tsemonling. The Dalai Lama's brother was accused in the same edict of numerous abuses. The Dalai Lama himself was exonerated from all blame, but was directed to take no part in government but to concentrate on his religious studies. In April 1791 the First Tsemonling died. Tatsag was traveling to China via the southern route when he was commanded to return to Lhasa and resume the regency, which he held until his death in 1811. The emperor said that the criticism in the previous edict had been mistaken.

In 1792 the emperor granted Tatsag the title of hui-t'ung ch'an-shih and a silver seal. He became proprietor of the Kundeling Monastery in Lhasa in 1794. The Kundeling Monastery was founded by the general Fuk'anggan (d.1796) and the amban Helin in 1794 to celebrate the successful conclusion of the Sino-Nepalese War. It was granted to the Tatsag lineage in perpetuity. In 1799 Tatsag visited the fourth Panchen Lama in Tashilhunpo Monastery.

The 8th Dalai Lama died in 1804. Tatsag was given the diploma and seal of a regent, and that year had a prayer for the rebirth of the 8th Dalai Lama printed and distributed throughout Tibet. In 1808 he led the selection of the 9th Dalai Lama, Lungtok Gyatso (1806–15). Tatsag died on 30 December 1810. One source says he died peacefully at his Kundeling Monastery, while another says he committed suicide by biting off his tongue. He was described by the Amban Ho-lin (1753–96) as a man of upright character, calm countenance and an unerring sense of justice. He was loyal to the Qing dynasty while regent in Tibet. He left more than ninety texts.

== Portrait ==
A painting of Gyaltsab Yeshe Lobzang Tanpa'i Gonpo in ground mineral pigment on cotton is held by the Rubin Museum of Art in New York City. Surrounding him are smaller depictions of Jampal Gyatso, the 8th Dalai Lama (1758–1804), Tanpa'i Nyima, the 4th Panchen Lama (1782–1853), Tadrag Pandita Ngagwang Chopel (1760-1839), Akshobhyavajra Guhyasamaja in Heruka form, Heruka Chakrasamvara, Ganden Monastery, the Legkyob Ling and the activity aspect of the protector deity Gyalpo Pehar with three faces and six hands, riding a snow lion.

== Sources ==
- Flora, Liz (January 2014). "The Eighth Tatsak Jedrung, Yeshe Lobzang Tenpai Gonpo". Treasury of Lives.
- Karsten, Joachim G. (2000). "On the Monastic Archives of Kun-bde gling, Lhasa, Including a Preliminary Analytical Historical Study of the Monastery Itself (1794-1959/2000)". University of Bonn. Archived from the original on 2016-03-04.
- Watt, Jeff (August 2011). "Teacher (Lama) (item no. 65916)". Himalayan Art Resources.
