= Chökyi Gyeltshen =

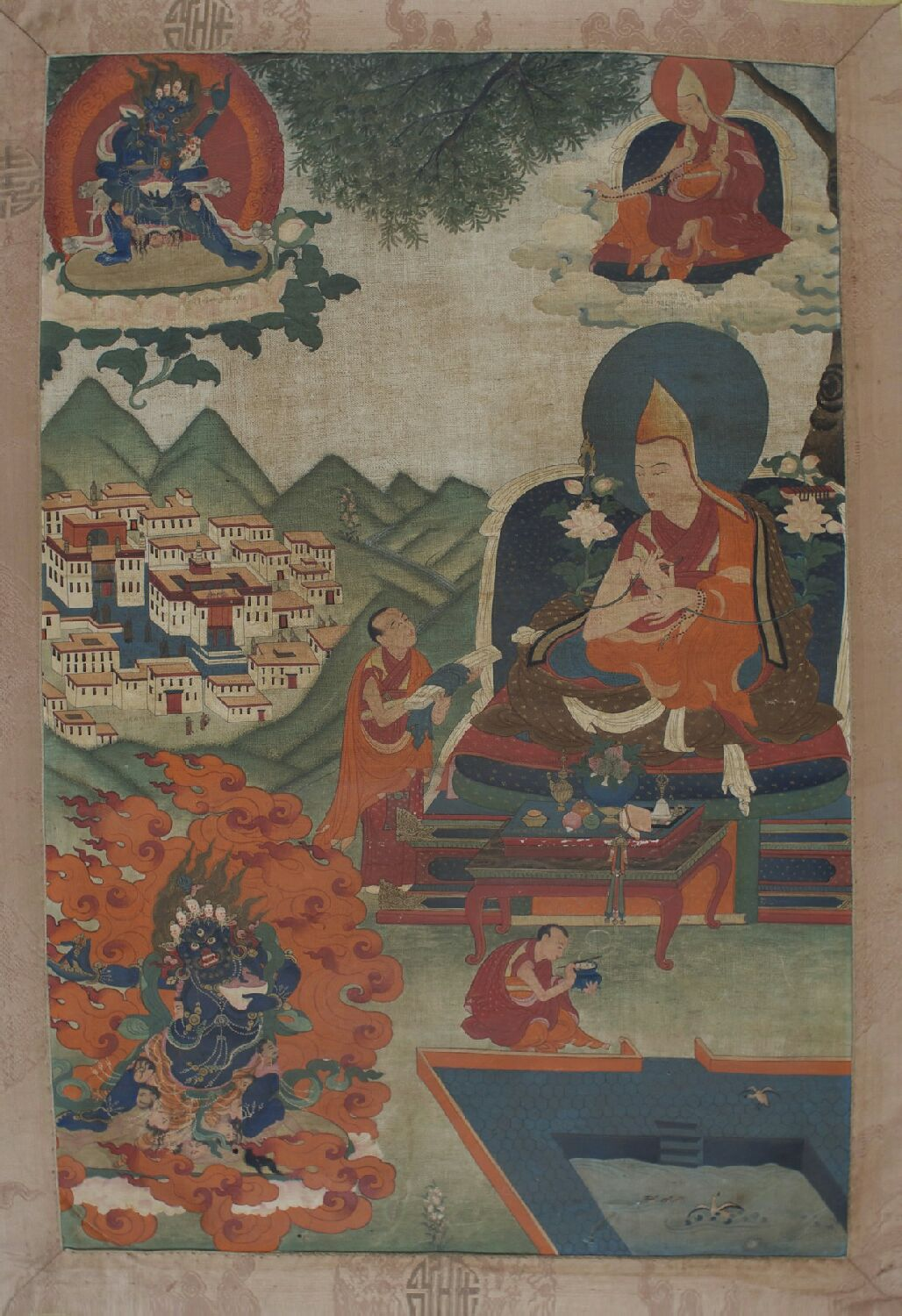

Chökyi Gyeltshen (Standard Tibetan: ཆོས་ཀྱི་རྒྱལ་མཚན, (Wylie: chos kyi rgyal mtshan)) (1402–1473) was a Tibetan spiritual leader. He was the sixth Ganden Tripa of the Gelug school of Tibetan Buddhism from 1463 to 1473. He was also the 1st Tatsak Rinpoche (rta tshag rin po che).

He was a student of Jampel Gyatso ('jam dpal rgya mtsho, 1356-1428). He became known as Baso Choje (ba so chos rje), because "he either founded or took over the monastery of Baso Lhundrub Dechen (ba so lhun grub bde chen dgon)."

As abbot of Ganden Monastery, he turned the main chapel into a "large temple," and installed "the gold gilt image of a form of Mañjuśrī known as Sanggye Sengge Ngaro (sangs rgyas sengge nga ro)."

"Chokyi Gyeltsen had three principle disciples, known collectively as the “Three Dorje Brothers” (rdo rje mched gsum): Chokyi Dorje (chos kyi rdo rje, b. c.1457), Pelden Dorje (dpal ldan rdo rje) from Tolung, and Dorje Pelwa (rdo rje dpal ba), from Kham. Jedrung Lhawang Chokyi Gyeltsen (rje drung lha dbang chos kyi rgyal mtshan, 1537-1603) was identified as Baso Chokyi Gyeltsen's reincarnation."
