= Tsomon Ling =

Tibetan Buddhist temple in Lhasa, Tibet, China

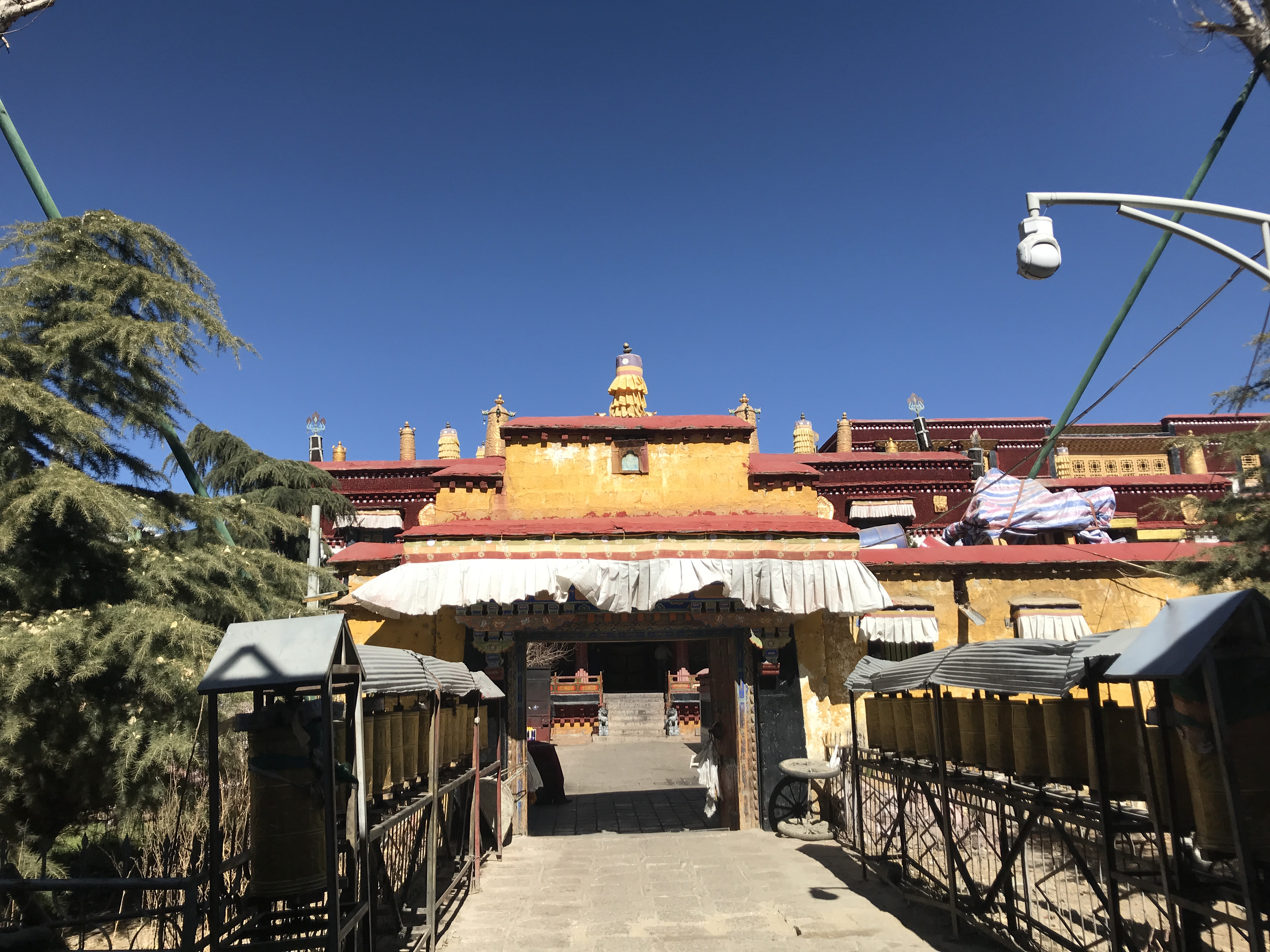
- Front gate of Tsomonling Monastery, Lhasa.

- Location within Tibet Autonomous Region

Religion
- Affiliation: Tibetan Buddhism

Location
- Location: Lhasa, Tibet Autonomous Region
- Country: China
- Interactive map of Tsomon Ling
- Coordinates: 29°39′24″N 91°7′48″E

Tsomon Ling, Tsomonling, Tsome Ling, Chomoling (Tibetan: ཚེ་སྨོན་གླིང།, Wylie: tshe smon gling, THL: tsé mön ling or Tsho smon gling - pronounced 'Tsemonling') is a temple in inner Lhasa, Tibet Autonomous Region, China, south of the Ramoche Temple, and on the corner of one of the main roads, Dekyi Shar Lam. It was one of the Four Royal Colleges or Regency Temples (Ling Shi or gLing bzhi) of Lhasa built during the 17th century after the Fifth Dalai Lama assumed both temporal as well as spiritual power. The other three Ling are Tengye Ling, Kunde Ling, and Drib Tsemchok Ling.

== Description ==
The present small site contains two temples; the dukang or Assembly Hall is still one of the tallest buildings in Lhasa. There is a large courtyard, on three sides of which are two-storied monks' quarters have all been turned into family residences. On the north is a building with two wings, the three-storied Karpo Podrang which dates from 1777 is on the east. It contains the assembly hall, six chapels and the reliquary of Numan Qan I on the ground level; a protector chapel on the second floor, and the residence of the monastic preceptors on the third level. The Marpo Podrang on the west contains an assembly hall with two protector chapels, a chapel dedicated to the eight Medicine Buddhas and reliquaries of Nomun Qan III and IV.

== History ==
=== The Four Royal Colleges ===
The Four Royal Colleges or Ling Shi were Tengye Ling, and Kunde Ling to the south and east of Chokpori (Wylie: lCags-po ri) are both within the old, but now destroyed, Lingkor, the pilgrim path wound its way for 8 km (5.0 mi) around Lhasa. The others were Drib Tsemchok Ling which has now disappeared but was located west of the Lhasa bridge, on the southern bank of the Kyi Chu or Tsangpo River, and Tsomon Ling itself.

The four Ling were built with Chinese patronage by the Dalai Lamas' Regents. The Gelugpa Lama-Regent who ruled during the minority of the Dalai Lama was normally picked from among the abbots of these colleges.

The most important of the Four Royal Colleges was Tengye Ling, the seat of the Demo Qutuqtus, who were the dominant regents in the 18th and 19th centuries when a series of Dalai Lamas were assassinated before they reached their majority and took power. Some people suspect the regents of assassinating the young Dalai Lamas, but others feel it was more likely that, "if foul play indeed was involved," it was the work of members of the lay aristocracy.

Tengye Ling was suppressed in 1901. Apparently it supported Chao Erh-feng when he invaded Lhasa. In 1912 it was attacked and destroyed because of its anti-government policies. After this the Demo Qutuqtu moved to Tsomon Ling. Two of the Nomun Qan Qutuqtus, whose residence was at Tsomon Ling, served as regents during the time of the Dalai Lama VIII (1777–1784) and during the time of the Dalai Lamas X and XI (1819 until 1844 when the Nomun Qan was exiled to China.
