= Kundeling Monastery =

Tibetan Buddhist monastery in Lhasa, Tibet

- Tibetan transcription(s); Tibetan: ཀུན་ བདེ་ གླིང; Wylie transliteration: kun bde gling Chinese transcription(s); Simplified: 功德林; Pinyin: Gōngdé lín
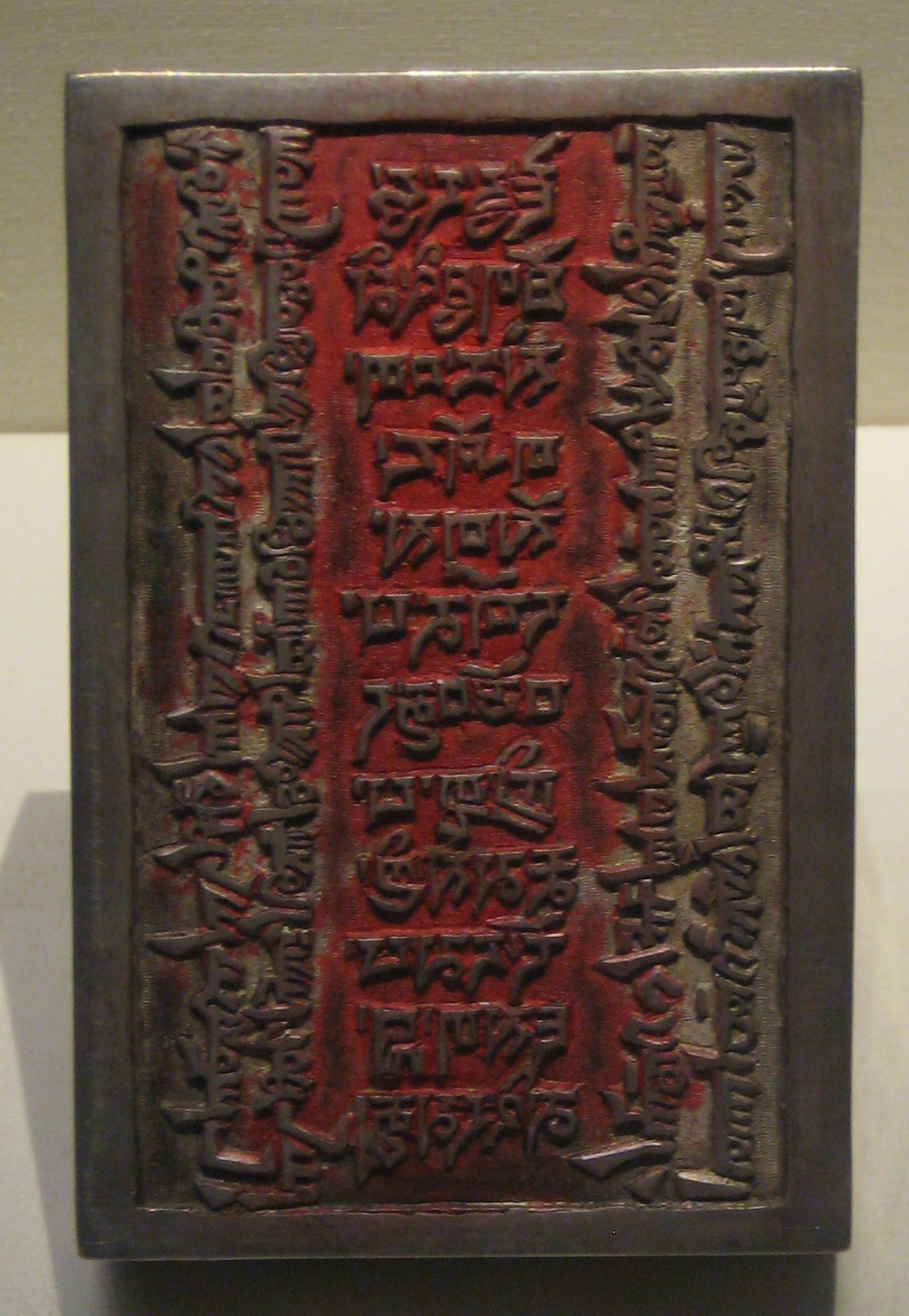
- Silver seal of the Jedruong Hutuktu [རྗེ་དྲུང་ཧུ་ཐོག་ཐུ་], an attendant to the Dalai Lama and Panchen Lama who lived at the Kunde Ling Monastery. Inscriptions in the Tibetan and Manchu scripts. Qing dynasty.

- Location within China

Religion
- Affiliation: Tibetan Buddhism

Location
- Location: Lhasa, Tibet Autonomous Region, China
- Country: China
- Coordinates: 29.6565075°N 91.1062317°E

Architecture
- Founder: Choedrub Dewal Doungen Rinpoche
- Established: 1663

Kundeling Monastery is a Tibetan Buddhist monastery in Lhasa, Tibet. It was founded around 1794, and follows the Gelug school. The head of the monastery belongs to a lineage of incarnations that dates back to 1402. There is dispute over the current incarnation. The monastery was destroyed during the Cultural Revolution, then rebuilt in the 1980s.

== History ==
Kunde Ling means "peaceful and happy" in the Tibetan language. The original Kunde Ling Monastery was built in 1794, one of four royal temples in Lhasa. (Note: The four royal monasteries were Kun-bde gling, bsTan-rgyas gling, Tshe-mchog gling and mTsho-smon gling. The 5th Dalai Lama (1617–82) appointed the four temples (ling), and the regents of Tibet were usually chosen from their members. bsTan-rgyas gling was destroyed in the 1910s. Tshe-mchog gling and mTsho-smon gling survived the political upheavals of the 20th century relatively intact.) (Note: A stele and most recent sources say the monastery was founded in 1794, although some sources give 1792 as the date. The earliest reference to it dates from 1796.) It is thought to have been the successor to the Yangs-pa-can, or Yangs-can, monastery founded in 1490 and destroyed in 1792. the Qing Emperor established the Kundeling Temple in lhasa near the Potala Palace and offered it to that Tatsak in celebration of the success of the Gurkha War. A Qing inscription translated by Hugh Richardson at the site of the monastery states that the Chinese military commander Fu Kang'an (d.1796) and the amban Helin, who served in Lhasa in 1793, founded the as a religious offering for the military victory. The inscription also gives possession of the temple to the Tatsak in perpetuity. It henceforth served as the seat of the Tatsak incarnation, and subsequent incarnations of the Tatsak Jedrung were also known as the Kundeling Hutuktu. The monastery was built outside the city walls of Lhasa on the road leading west. It followed the Gelug school.

Kun-bde gling is known for owning the printing blocks for the religion-historical work called The Blue Annals (Deb-ther sngon-po), written in 1478. It also owned blocks for various other works. By 1830 the monastery owned extensive estates acquired by imperial grants, donations or purchase from the local peasants. These provided income to support the monastery.

Kundeling was destroyed in the early 1960s during the Cultural Revolution, A much smaller Kundeling monastery was built slightly to the west of the former location in the 1980s. Monasteries are important tourist attractions in Lhasa. In 2011 the government had allocated about US $3 million for restoration of the building's fabric, including repairs to the roof, walls, courtyard and drains. That year the monastery was listed as a key protected cultural site.

== Today ==
The monastery is at the foot of the Bar-ma ri (Parma Ri) mountain, below the Ges-ar Temple, which it owned. It is near Beijing Middle Road. Two restored chapels are open to visitors. On an upper level there is a mural of the original temple, which was mostly destroyed. In 2011 it was reported that there were forty-two monks, of whom ten were teenagers or in their early twenties. This was down from eighty in the 1990s. The young monks undertake most of the work of cleaning, cooking and minor repairs. Their life is austere, with no modern conveniences.

== Tatsag lineage ==
The proprietors of the monastery, who hold the title rTa-tshag rje-drung ho-thog-thu, or sometimes rTa-tshag rje-drung rin-po-che, are considered to be incarnations. The first member of the Tatsag lineage was Baso Chokyi Gyaltsen (Wylie Ba-so Chos-kyi rgyal-mtshan; 1402–73). The eighth incarnation, Yeshe Lobsang Tenpai Gonpo (1760–1810), was granted ownership of the monastery. Proprietors of the monastery since then have been:

8. rTa-tshag (III) Ba-so rje-drung qutuqtu Ye-shes blo-bzang bstan-pa'i mgon-po alias Yi-hsi luo-sang tan-pei kung-pu (1760–1810)
9. rTa-tshag (IV) Ngag-dbang blo-bzang bstan-pa'i rgyal-mtshan alias Luo-pu-sang tan-pei chien-ts'an (1811–48)
10. rTa-tshag (V) Ngag-dbang dpal-ldan chos-kyi rgyal-mtshan alias A-wang pan-tien ch'u-chi chien-ts'an (1850/1854–86)
11. rTa-tshag (VI) Ngag-dbang thub-ldan skal-bzang sgron-me (1888–1918)
12. rTa-tshag (VII) Blo-bzang thub-bstan 'jigs-med rgyal-mtshan (1924–56)

The eighth and tenth members of this lineage served as regents of Tibet (1789–90, 1791–1811, 1875–86). The thirteenth member of the lineage as recognized by the Dalai Lama was rTa-tshag (VIII) bsTan-'dzin chos-kyi rgyal-mtshan, born about 1958. He fled to India in 1959. A parallel incarnation is recognized in Lhasa, rTa-tshag (VIII) Blo-bzang ye-shes.

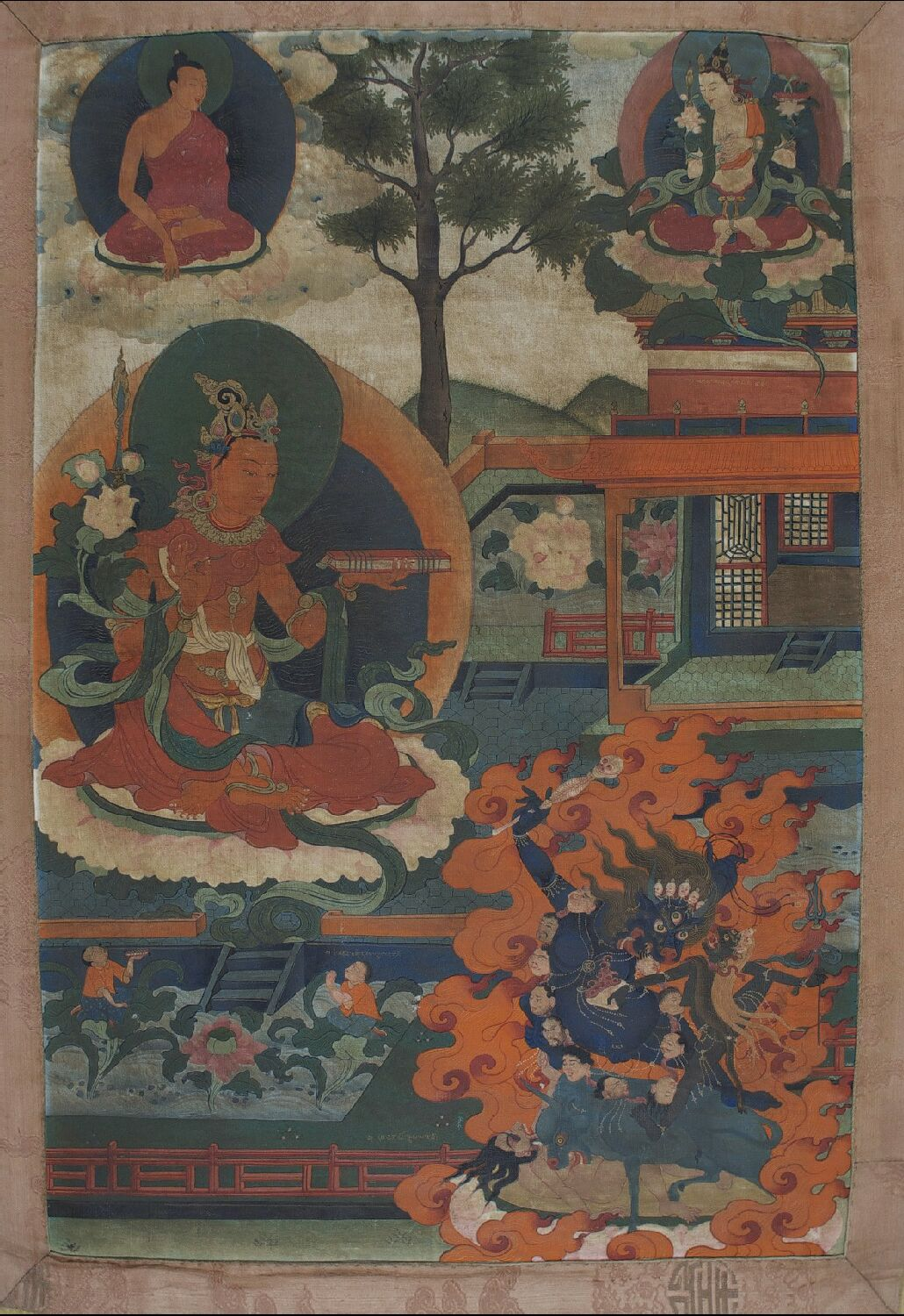
Manjusri in Bodhisattva Appearance

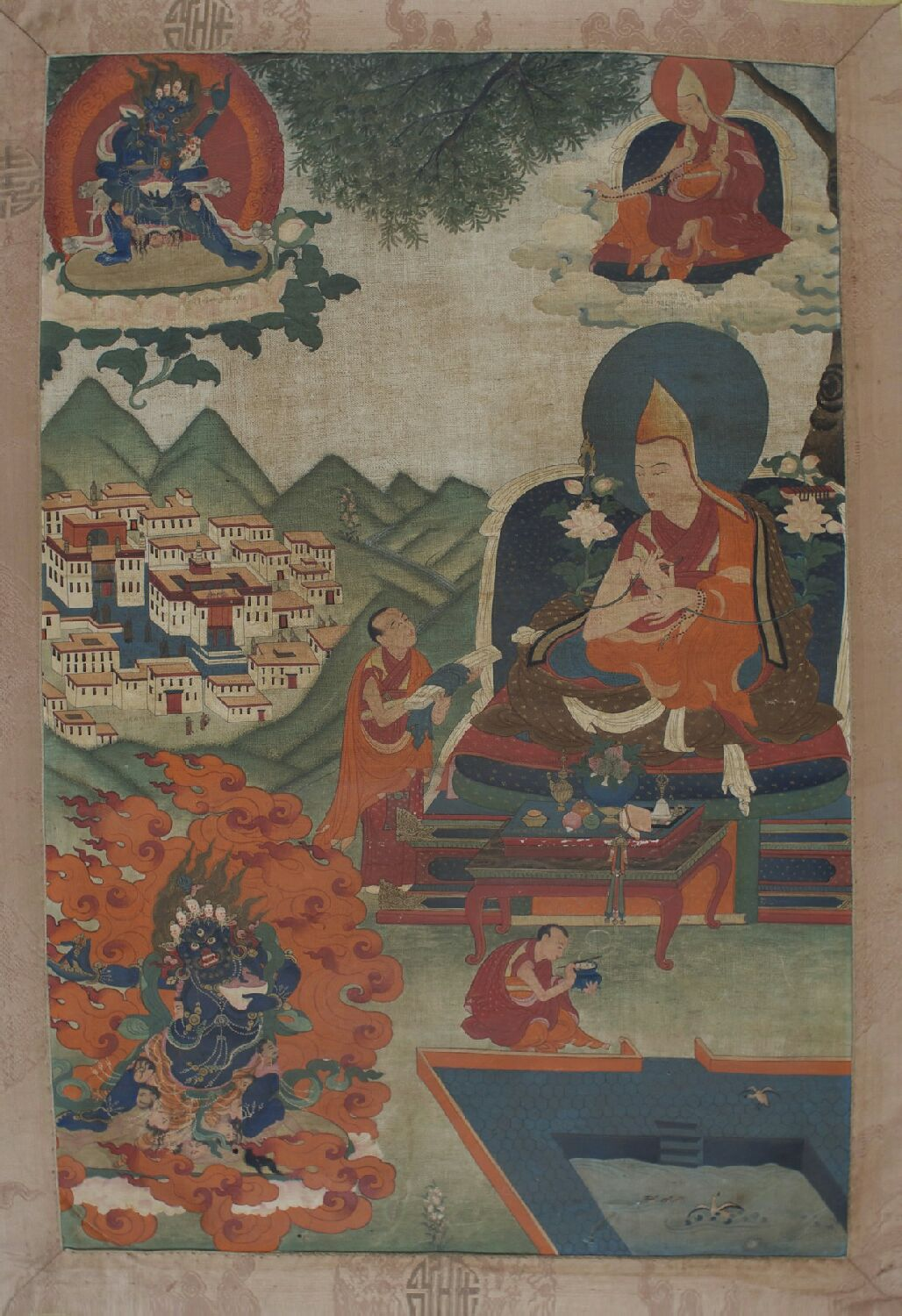
Baso Chokyi Gyaltsen, 1st Tatsag

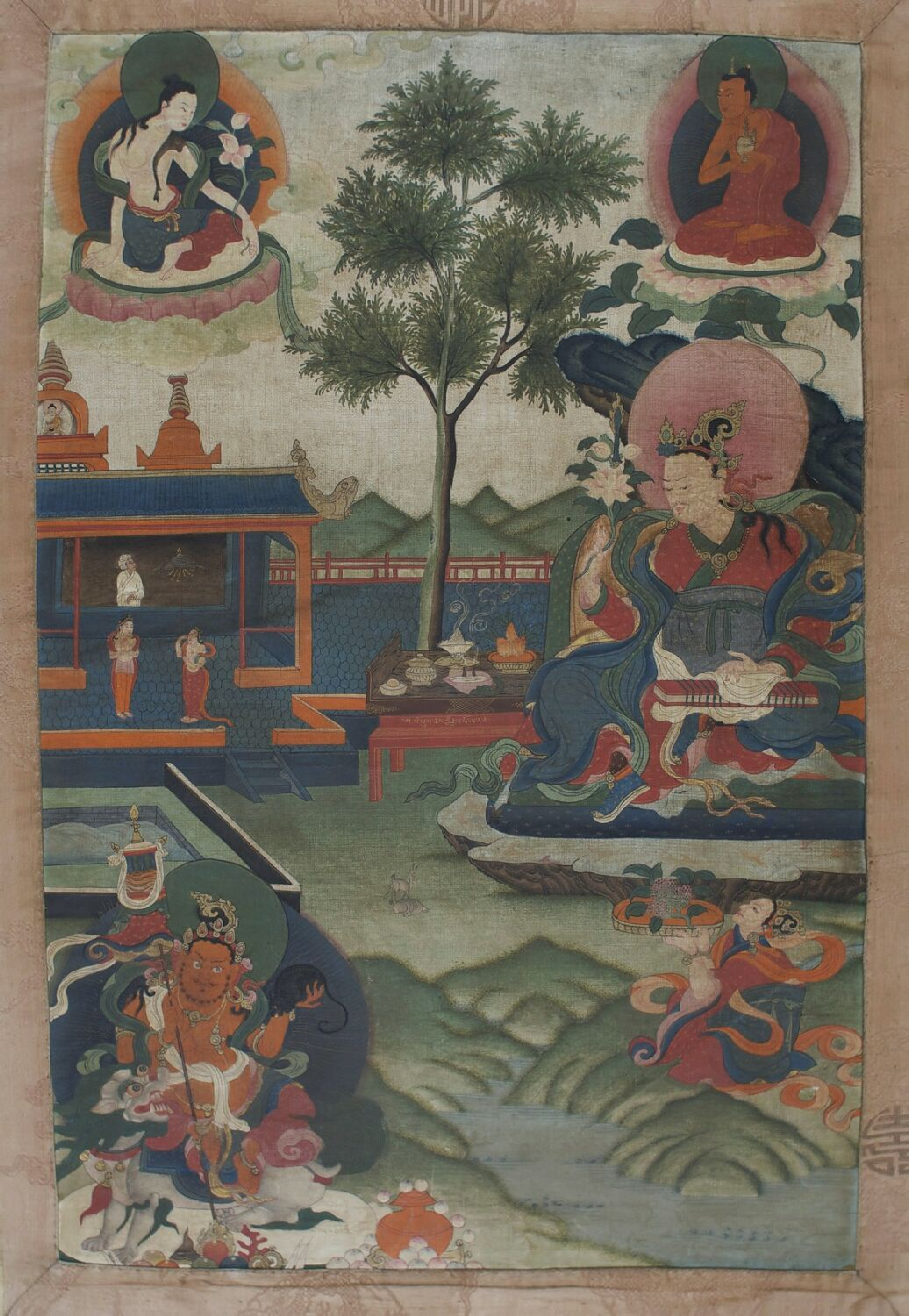
Liyul Chokyi Gyalpo, 3rd Tatsag.jpg

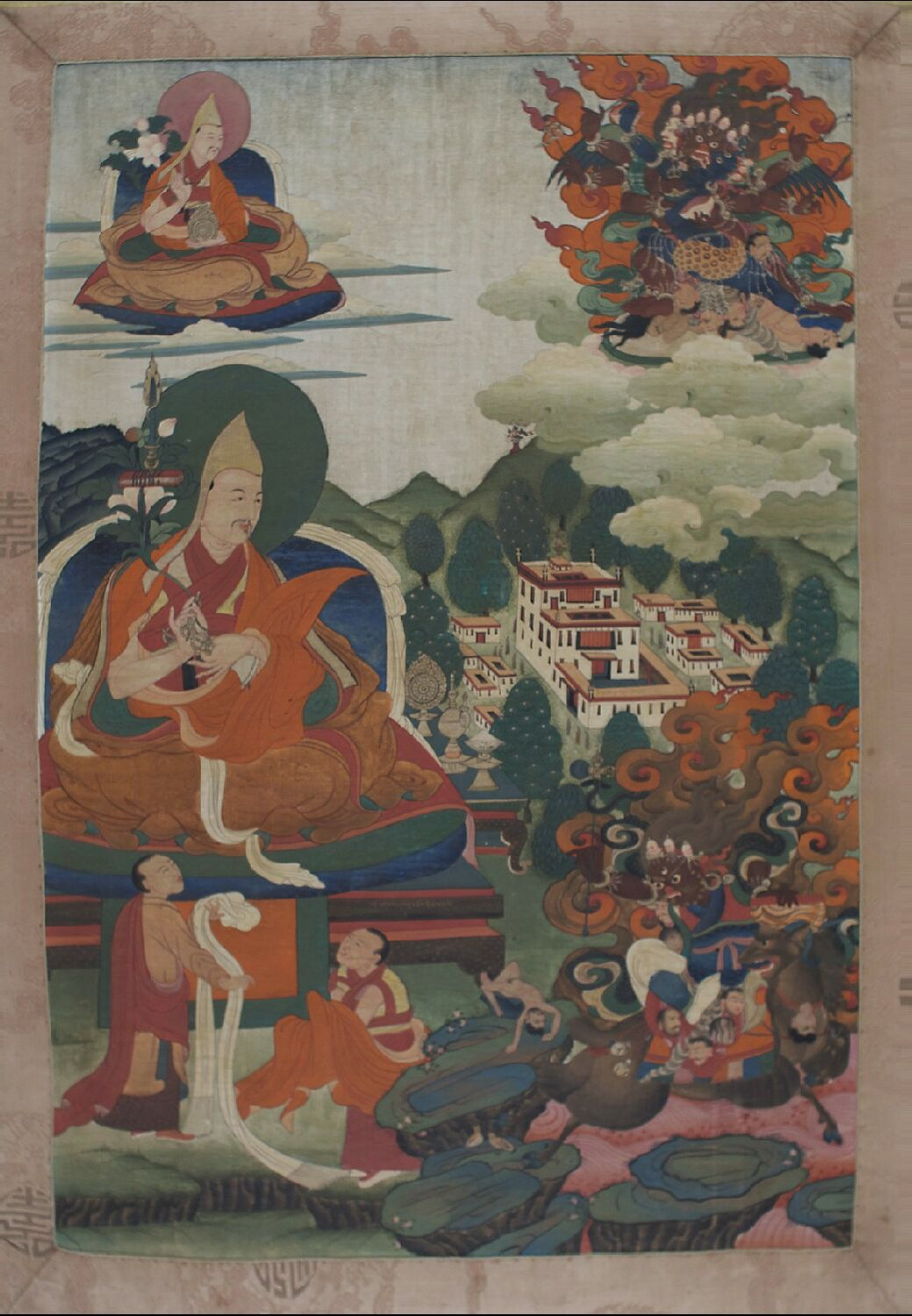
Ngagwang Konchog Nyima, 6th Tatsag.jpg

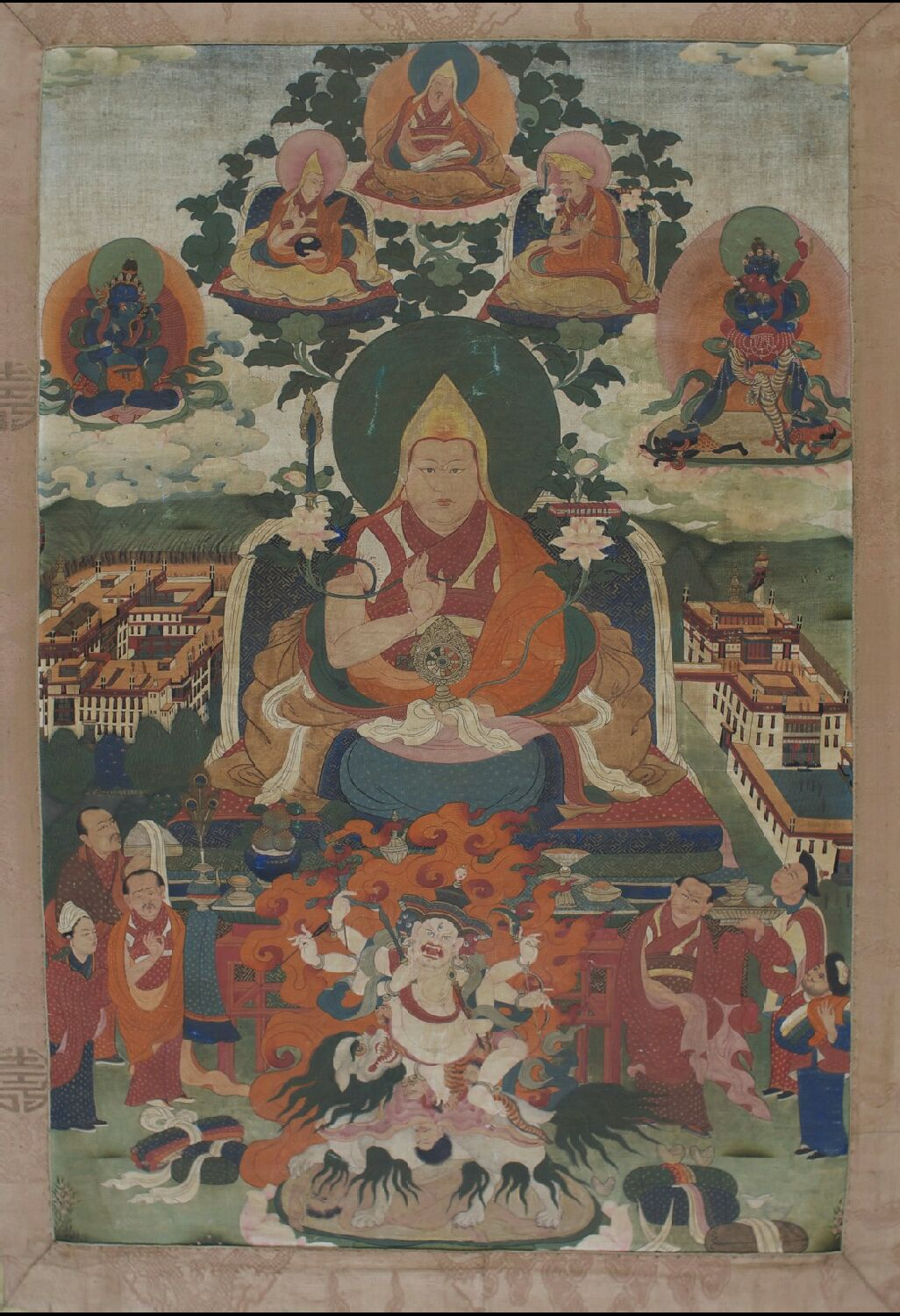
Gyaltsab Yeshe Lobzang Tanpa'i Gonpo, the 8th Tatsag

== Sources ==
- Chapman, Frederick Spencer (14 February 1937). "Four Gelugpa monks blowing ceremonial horns on the roof of Kundeling monastery, Lhasa, Tibet, 14th February 1937". Archived from the original on 23 February 2015.
- Karsten, Joachim G. (2000). "On the Monastic Archives of Kun-bde gling, Lhasa, Including a Preliminary Analytical Historical Study of the Monastery Itself (1794-1959/2000)". University of Bonn. Archived from the original on 4 March 2016.
- "Kunde Ling". Lonely Planet.
- Li, Lily (7 November 2014). "Kunde Ling Monastery in Lhasa (I)". China Tiber Online. Archived from the original on 22 February 2015.
- Peng Yining; Dachiong (2 June 2011). "In the service of gods". China Daily.
