= Golmud South railway station =

Freight railway station in Haixi, Qinghai

Golmud South 格尔木南

General information
- Location: Golmud, Haixi Mongol and Tibetan Autonomous Prefecture, Qinghai; China
- Coordinates: 36.3556°N 94.9027°E
- Operated by: China Railway Qingzang Group
Location

Golmud South railway station (Chinese: 格尔木南站) is a freight-handling station in Golmud, Haixi Mongol and Tibetan Autonomous Prefecture, Qinghai, China. It is under the jurisdiction of China Railway Qingzang Group.

The station is located on a loop from the Qinghai–Tibet railway, bypassing Golmud railway station. There is also a connection to the Golmud–Korla railway.

== History ==
Plans to construct a new railway station in Golmud, bypassing the existing Golmud station, were announced in 2012. The station was completed in April 2021.
