= Golmud (disambiguation) =

Golmud may refer to:

- Golmud (also Ge'ermu or Geermu) - city in China
- Golmud railway station - main railway station in Golmud
- Golmud East railway station
