= Buqiangge railway station =

Railway station in China

Coordinates: 33.2519°N 91.8634°E

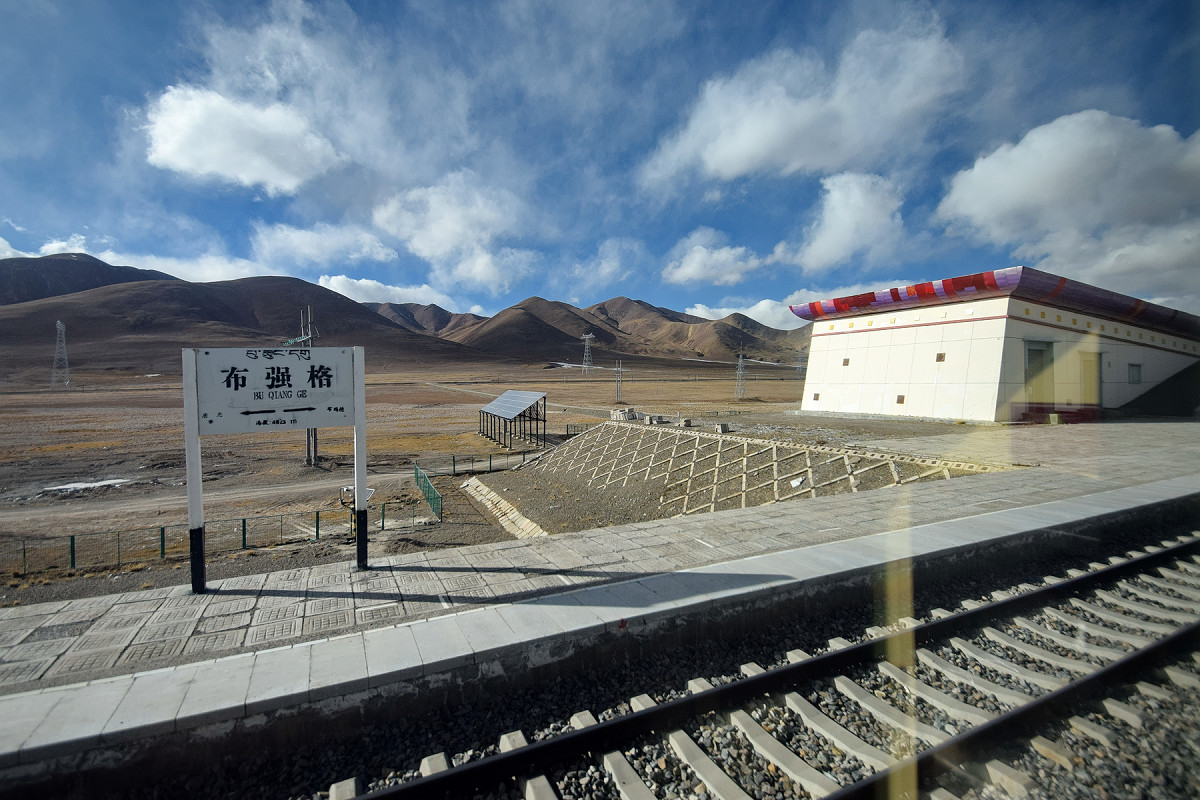
View of Buqiangge station

Buqiangge railway station (Chinese: 布强格; pinyin: Bùqiánggé zhàn) is a station on the Chinese Qinghai–Tibet Railway. Located at 4,823 metres (15,823 ft), it is one of the highest railway stations in the world.

== See also ==
- Qinghai–Tibet Railway
- List of stations on Qinghai–Tibet railway

| Preceding station | China Railway | Following station |
|---|---|---|
| Bumade towards Xining | Qinghai–Tibet railway | Tanggula towards Lhasa |
