= Yangbajain railway station =

Railway station in China

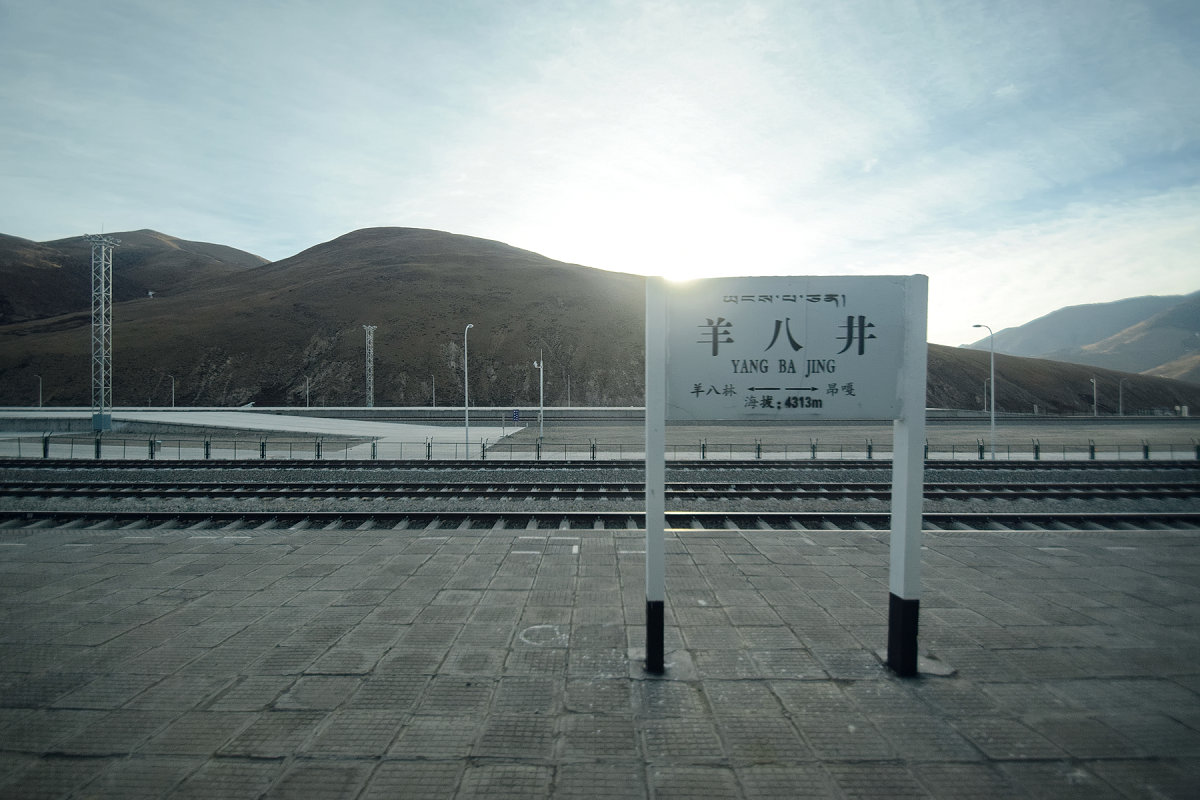
Yangbajing railway station

Yangbajing railway station (Chinese: 羊八井站), or Yangbajain railway station, is one of the stations in the Chinese Qingzang Railway. The station is located in the southern part of China. It is a high elevation railway connecting the autonomous region of China to Tibet.

It was opened to the public on July 1, 2006. The station is an unstaffed observation station of the Qinghai-Tibet Railway and is operated by the Qinghai-Tibet Railway Group Company.

== See also ==
- Qingzang Railway
- List of stations on Qingzang railway

Preceding station	China Railway	Following station
Yangbaling towards Xining	Qinghai–Tibet railway	Angga towards Lhasa
