= Yangbajing Tunnel =

Railway tunnel in Tibet, China

Coordinates: 30°02′30″N 90°36′00″E

The Yangbajing Tunnel (Chinese: 羊八井一号隧道) is a railway tunnel, some 3,345 metres long, of the Qinghai–Tibet Railway which links Xining with Lhasa across the high Tibetan Plateau of north-east China. It is 4,264 metres above sea level and located 80 kilometres NW of the Tibetan regional capital, Lhasa. It is longest tunnel on the line from Goldmod to Lhasa, and part of one of the highest railways in the world, The highest rail tunnel in the world is the 1,338 m Fenghuoshan tunnel which is situated at 4,905 m above sea level, and called "the nearest door to the heaven." This railroad totals a combined length of 160 km of 675 bridges. 550 km is situated on permafrost.

Because of its length and extreme elevation, maintaining air quality, as affected by the specially designed high altitude diesel engines which operate in series, is problematical.
