= Lhasa West railway station =

Railway station in Lhasa, Tibet, China

Coordinates: 29°38′38″N 90°58′00″E

Lhasa West railway station (simplified Chinese: 拉萨西站; traditional Chinese: 拉薩西站; pinyin: lā sà xī zhàn) is a railway station in Lhasa, Tibet, China. It underwent renovations from 2016 to 2018.

This is a cargo station so no passenger trains stop at here as of November 2023.

== See also ==
- List of stations on Qingzang railway

Preceding station	China Railway	Following station
Gurong towards Xining	Qinghai–Tibet railway	Lhasa Terminus
