= Tanggula railway station =

Railway station in Tibet, China

Coordinates: 33°0′18.35″N 91°38′57.62″E

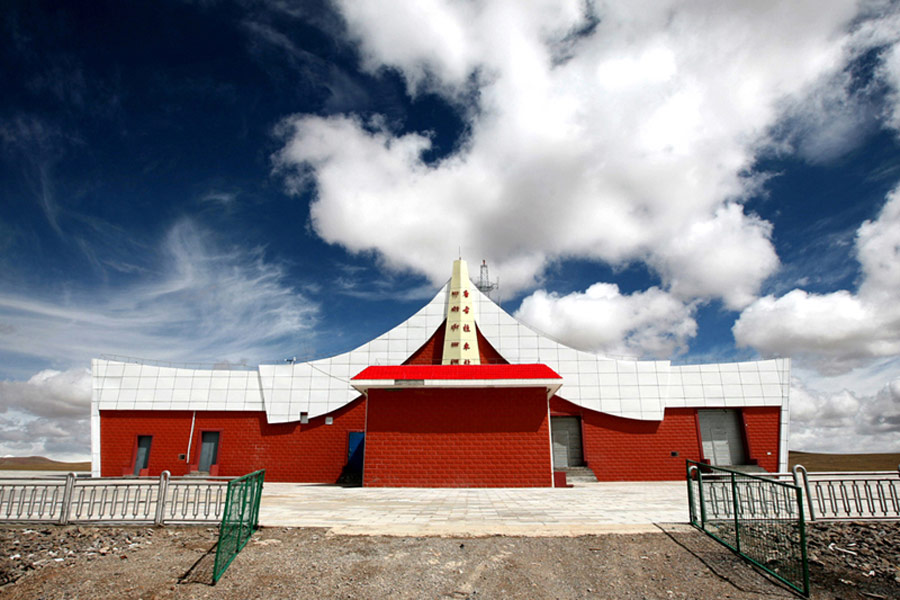
Tanggula Railway Station

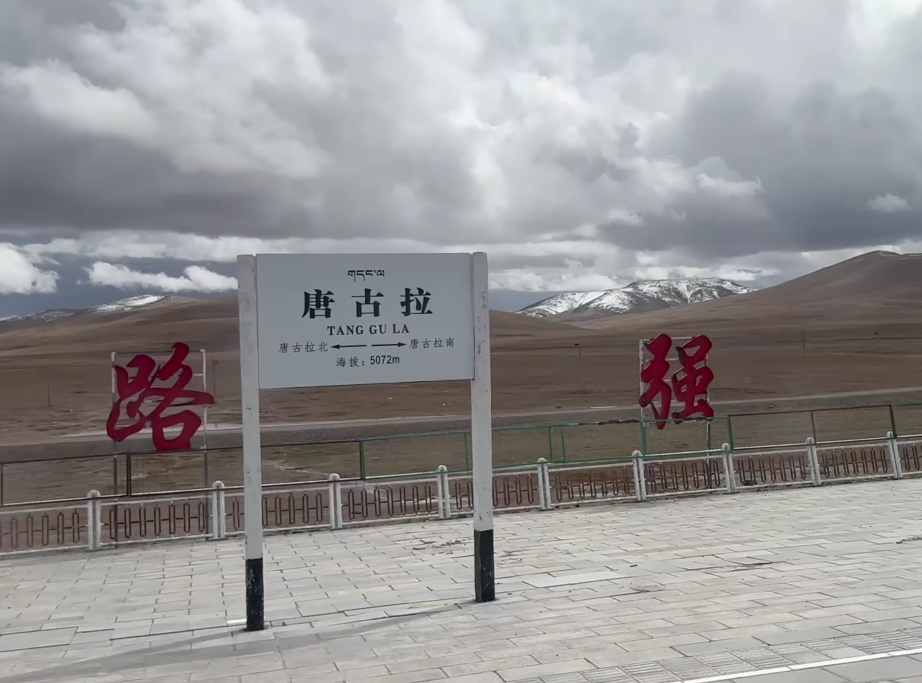
Tanggula Railway Station platform

The Tanggula (Dangla) railway station (Tibetan: གདང་ལ་འབབ་ཚུགས།, Chinese: 唐古拉站; pinyin: Tánggǔlā zhàn) is a railway station located in Golmud, Haixi Mongol and Tibetan Autonomous Prefecture, China, near the border of Tibet within Amdo County. The railway station has three tracks, one of them served by a platform, and another one served by a fairly short stub platform.

Since its construction, Tanggula Railway Station has been the highest railway station in the world, at 5,068 metres above sea level. It is close to Tanggula Pass, a popular tourist site often called the 'Roof of the World'

== Description ==
This unstaffed station on the Qingzang railway opened for service on July 1, 2006. The station is located 5,068 metres (16,627 ft) above sea level – surpassing Cóndor station at 4,786 metres (15,702 ft) on the Rio Mulatos-Potosí line in Bolivia and Galera Station at 4,781 m (15,681 feet) in Peru for title of highest railway station in the world. It is no more than 1 km (0.6 miles) away from the highest point of rail track at 5,072 metres (16,640 ft).

The station is 1.25 kilometres (4,100 ft) long and covers 77,002 square metres (19.028 acres). There are 3 rail tracks in the station. The location of the station was specially chosen for the view from the platform.

Passengers usually aren't permitted to step out of the train whilst it stops at the station, and the station is instead used chiefly for emergency repairs and the movement of supplies and goods to the town of Tanggulashan.

== History ==
Construction of the railway station began on June 29, 2001, only finishing on July 1, 2006, almost exactly 5 years after construction began. This delay was due to the remoteness of the area and the general difficulties with transporting goods and materials into such a far-away place. The project cost 26.2 Billion Yuan (3.1 Billion Dollars) to build, and was expected to be a major tourist destination.

In 2008, the company Tangula Railtours began to rail tours that passed through Tanggula Railway Station, hence the name. The tours went from Beijing to Lhasa, and lasted 5 days.

In 2009, all civilian transport was halted due to the very low population of the area, and as such the station lost a lot of its purpose, merely being used as a stopping point for trains to wait for other trains to pass.

== See also ==
- List of highest railway stations in the world
- List of stations on Qingzang railway
- Qingzang railway
- Tanggula Pass

Preceding station	China Railway	Following station
Tanggula North towards Xining	Qinghai–Tibet railway	Tanggula South towards Lhasa
