= Nanshankou railway station =

Railway station in Golmud, China

Coordinates: 36.1927°N 94.7795°E

Nanshankou railway station

Nanshankou railway station (南山口站) is a station on the Chinese Qinghai–Tibet Railway in Golmud, Qinghai Province. It is located on the Tibetan Plateau at an altitude of approximately 3,080 metres (10,100 ft) above sea level. In 2006, the station became the starting point for the new Golmud–Lhasa section of the Qinghai–Tibet Railway. As of 2016, the stationmaster was Hua Yinghai.

During the summer, temperature at Nanshankou rises rapidly, causing drastic expansion and contraction of the rails.

== See also ==
- Qinghai–Tibet Railway
- List of stations on Qinghai–Tibet railway

Preceding station	China Railway	Following station
Golmud towards Xining	Qinghai–Tibet railway	Ganlong towards Lhasa
