= Daqiongguo railway station =

Railway station in China

Coordinates: 30.30602°N 90.79855°E

Daqiongguo railway station is a station on the Chinese Qingzang Railway, at an altitude of 4327m.

== See also ==
- Qingzang Railway
- List of stations on Qingzang railway

Preceding station	China Railway	Following station
Dangxiong towards Xining	Qinghai–Tibet railway	Yangbaling towards Lhasa
