= Tanggula South railway station =

Railway station in China

Coordinates: 32.8680°N 91.5296°E

Tanggula South railway station is a station on the Chinese Qinghai–Tibet Railway.

== See also ==
- List of highest railway stations in the world
- Qinghai–Tibet Railway
- List of stations on Qinghai–Tibet railway

Preceding station	China Railway	Following station
Tanggula towards Xining	Qinghai–Tibet railway	Za'gyazangbo towards Lhasa
