= Pingshuang railway station =

Railway station in China

Pingshuang railway station is a station on the Chinese Qinghai–Tibet Railway. It was built in 1979 as a fifth-class station for the China Railway Qinghai-Tibet group Co., Ltd

== See also ==
- Qinghai–Tibet Railway
- List of stations on Qinghai–Tibet railway

Preceding station	China Railway	Following station
Quanshuiliang towards Xining	Qinghai–Tibet railway	Hangya towards Lhasa
