= China Railway Qingzang Group =

Chinese railway company

China Railway Qingzang Group Co., Ltd.
- Type: state-owned enterprise
- Industry: Railway operations
- Predecessor: Qinghai-Tibet Railway Company
- Founded: 19 November 2017
- Headquarters: 22 Jianguo Road, Chengdong, Xining, Qinghai, China
- Area served: Qinghai; Tibet
- Owner: Government of China
- Parent: China Railway
- Website: Official Website

China Railway Qingzang Group
- Simplified Chinese: 中国铁路青藏集团
- Traditional Chinese: 中國鐵路青藏集團
Transcriptions
Standard Mandarin
- Hanyu Pinyin: Zhōngguó Tiělù Qīngzàng Jítuán

Qinghai-Tibet Railway Company
- Simplified Chinese: 青藏铁路公司
- Traditional Chinese: 青藏鐵路公司
Transcriptions
Standard Mandarin
- Hanyu Pinyin: Qīngzàng Tiělù Gōngsī

CR Qingzang
- Simplified Chinese: 藏铁
- Traditional Chinese: 藏鐵
Transcriptions
Standard Mandarin
- Hanyu Pinyin: Zàngtiě

China Railway Qingzang Group, officially abbreviated as CR Qingzang or CR-Qingzang, also known as CR Qinghai-Tibet and CRQT, formerly, Qinghai-Tibet Railway Company or Qingzang Railway Company, is a subsidiary company under the jurisdiction of the China Railway Group (formerly the Ministry of Railways). The company was founded in 2002 and reincorporated in 2017.

It is responsible for the railway network within Qinghai and Tibet, the Qinghai–Tibet railway.

== Hub stations ==
- Xining
  - Xining
- Lhasa
  - Lhasa
- Golmud
  - Golmud
- Xigazê
  - Xigazê
- Delingha
  - Delingha
- Nagqu
  - Nagqu
