= China Railways NJ2 =

Chinese diesel-electric locomotive class

NJ2
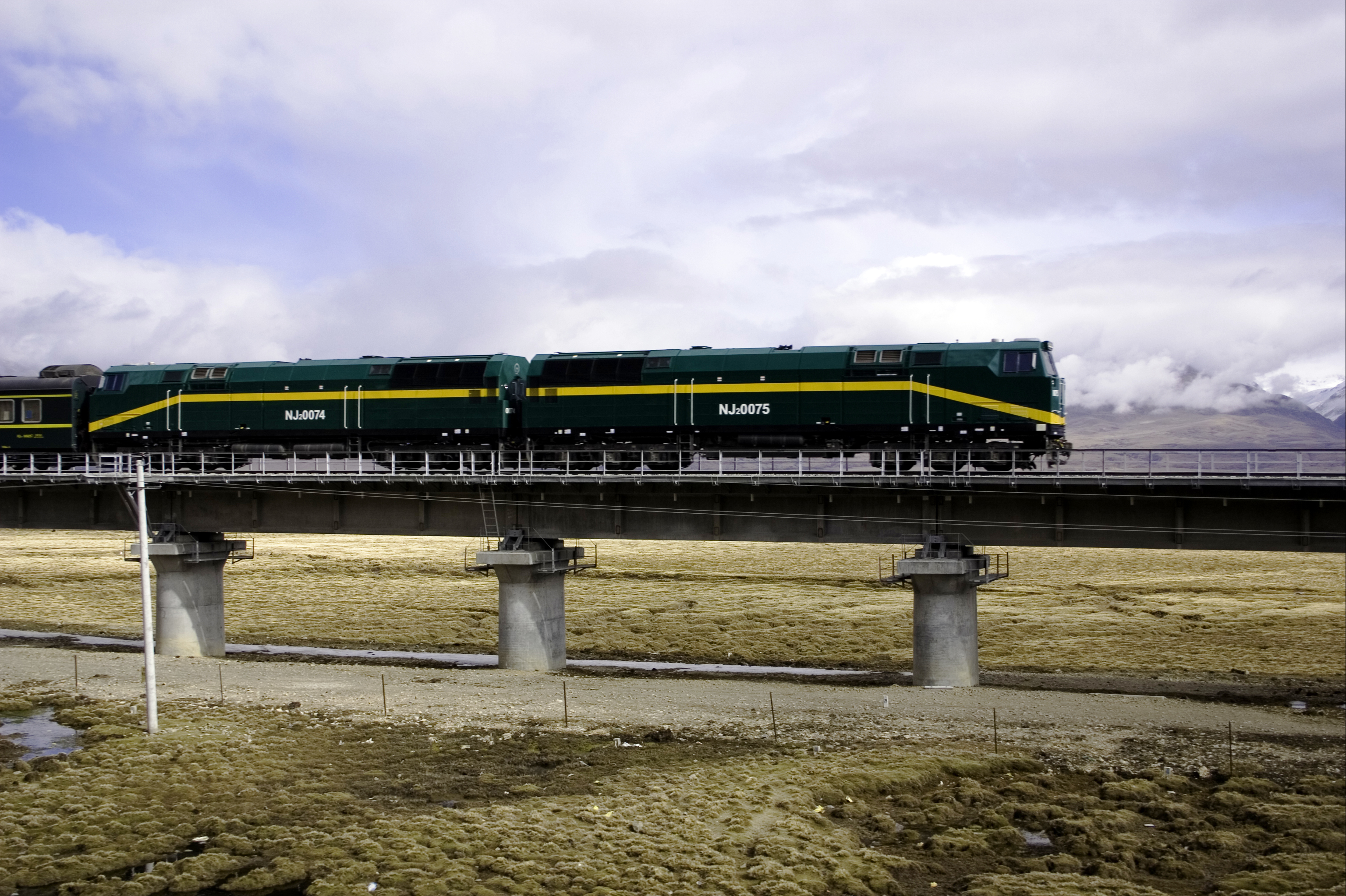
- NJ2-0074 and 0075
Type and origin
- Power type: Diesel-electric
- Builder: GE Transportation Systems
- Model: C38AChe
- Build date: 2006–2007
- Total produced: 78
Specifications
- Configuration
  - UIC: Co′Co′
- Gauge: 1,435 mm (4 ft 8 1/2 in)
- Length: 20,853 mm (68 ft 5.0 in)
- Width: 3,119 mm (10 ft 2.8 in)
- Height: 4,765 mm (15 ft 7.6 in)
- Axle load: 23 t (23 long tons; 25 short tons)
- Loco weight: 138 t (136 long tons; 152 short tons)
- Fuel type: Diesel
- Fuel capacity: 9,000 L (2,400 US gal)
- Water cap.: 925 L (244 US gal)
- Transmission: Electric（AC—DC—AC）
Performance figures
- Maximum speed: 120 km/h (75 mph)
- Power output: 3,800 kW (5,100 hp)
Career
- Operators: China Railway
- Numbers: NJ_{2}0001-NJ_{2}0078
- Locale: China

The NJ2 is a diesel-electric locomotive used by China Railway in the People's Republic of China. Built in Erie, Pennsylvania, it is based on a standard GE Transportation Systems GE Dash 9-44CW and marketed as GE C38AChe.

It was specially customised for high altitude operation on the Qinghai-Tibet Railway route. It is used on the Qingzang Railway that connects Xining, Qinghai Province, to Lhasa, Tibet Autonomous Region, in the People's Republic of China.

== Gallery ==
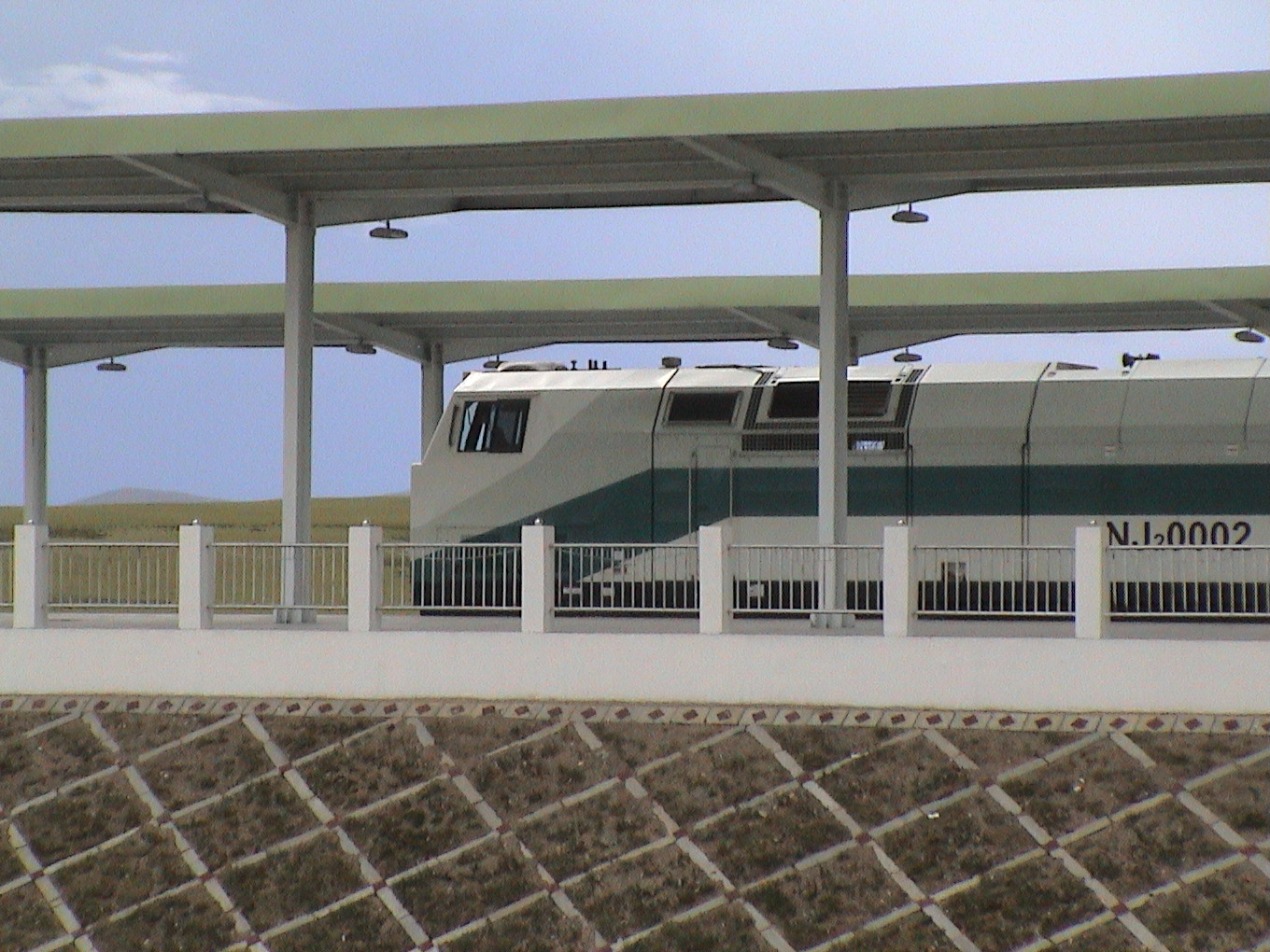
NJ2-0002

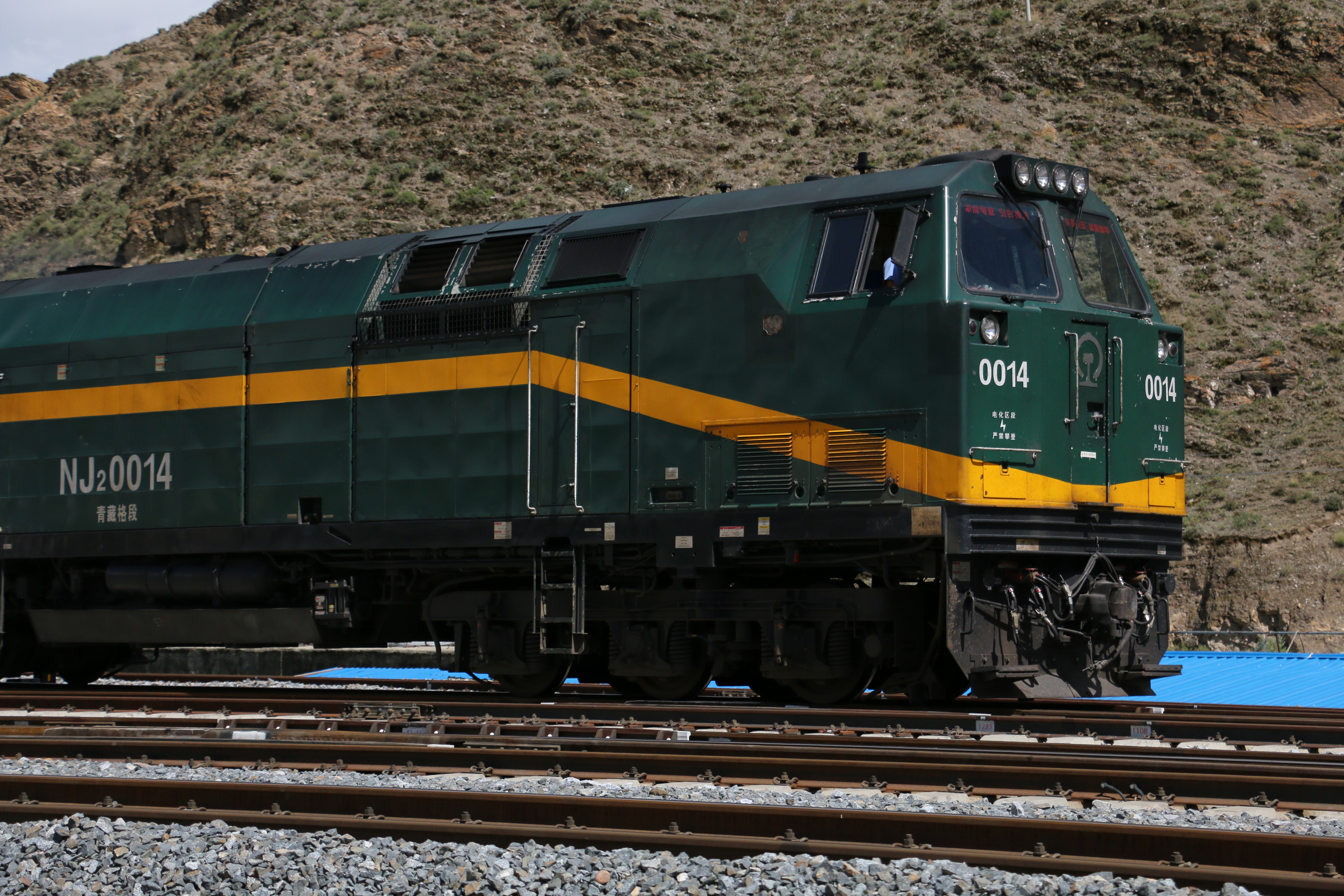
NJ2-0014

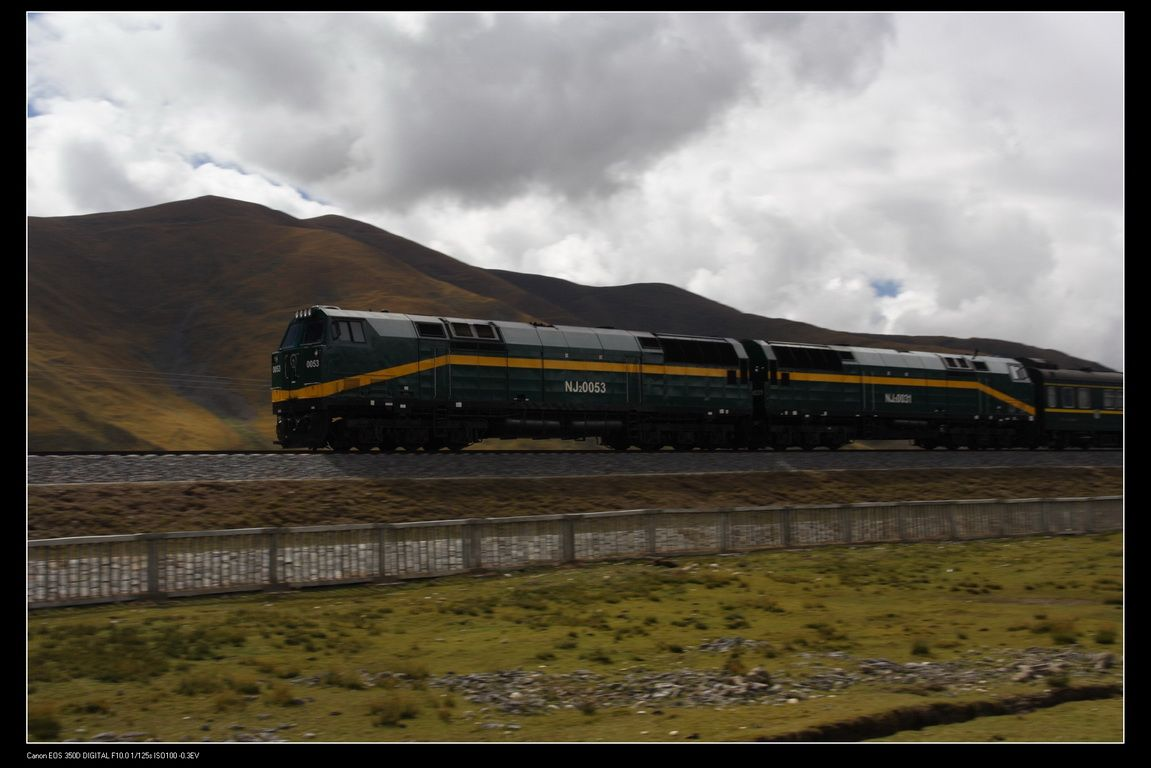
NJ2-0053

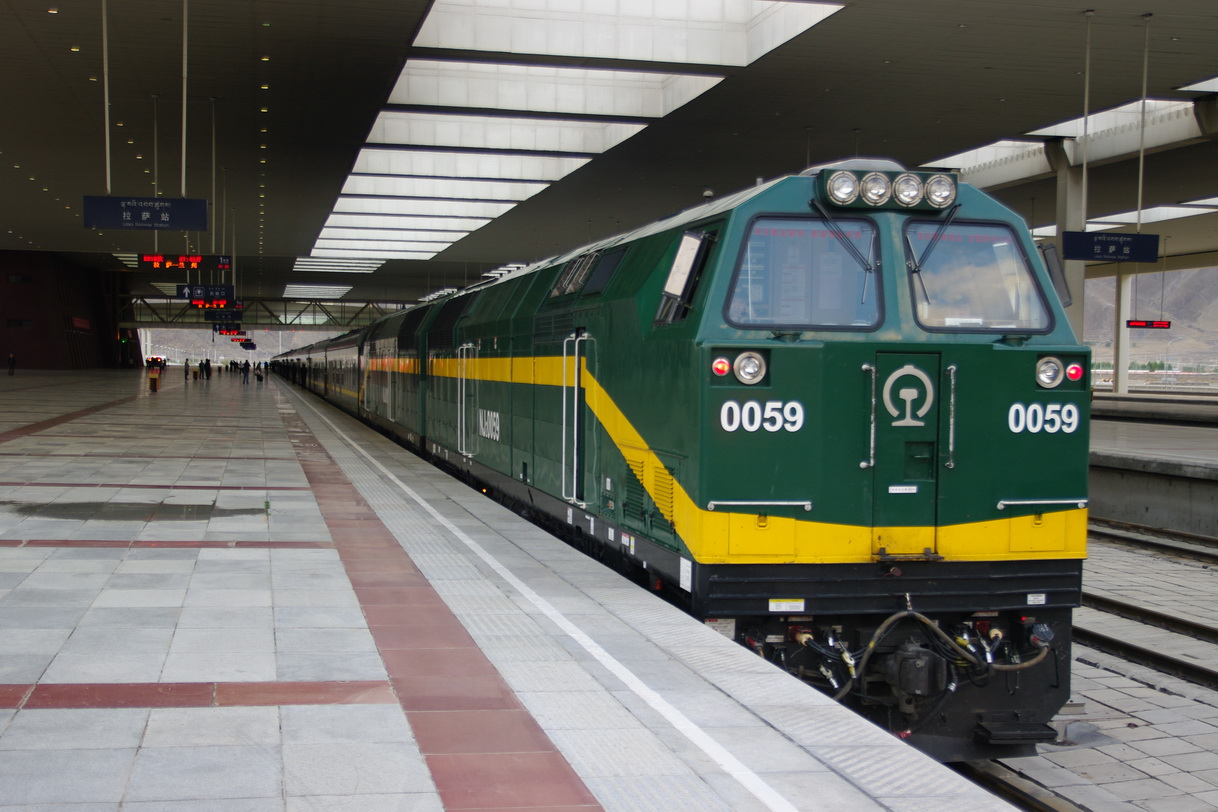
NJ2-0059 at Lhasa railway station

== See also ==
- C38Emi, a variant of GE Dash 9-44CW operating in Brazil
- GE C36-7, operated by China Railways as ND5 locomotives
- China Railways HXN5, GE Evolution ES-59ACi
- China Railways HXN3, another type of locomotive used for Tibet route, built by EMD.
