= Xining West railway station =

Railway station in Xining, Qinghai, China

Xining West railway station 西宁西站
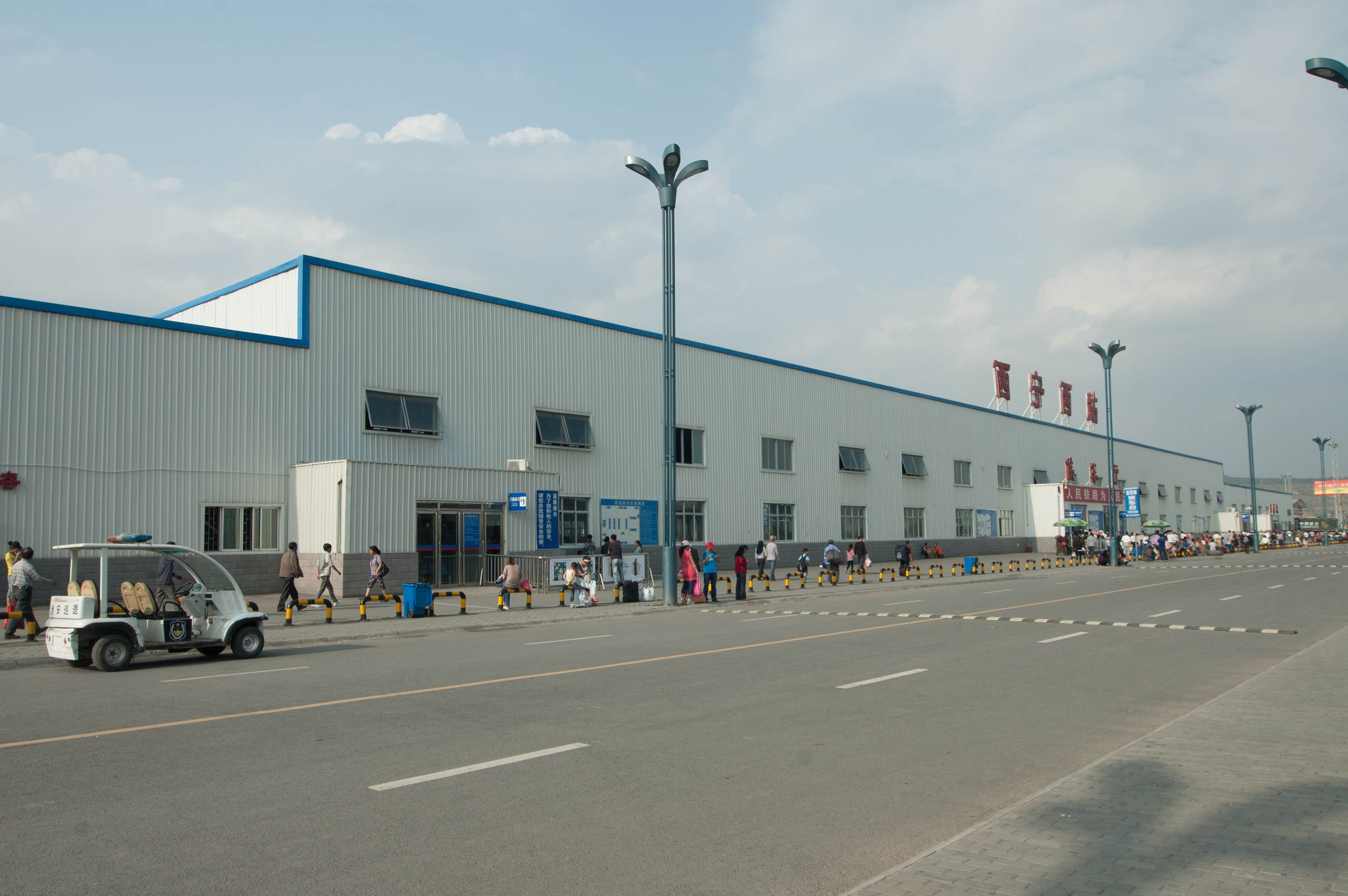
- The station building

General information
- Location: Xining, Qinghai; China
- Line: Qingzang railway
Location

Xining West Railway Station (simplified Chinese: 西宁西站; traditional Chinese: 西寧西站; pinyin: Xīníng Xī Zhàn) is a railway station on the Qingzang railway. It serves the suburbs of the city of Xining and is located 12 km from Xining Railway Station. The railway station was first opened in 1959, and was rebuilt in 2014.

== Station design ==
The railway station covers a total of 61,000 square meters, and has 9 platforms with 12 railway tracks. The station has three floors.

== See also ==
- List of stations on Qingzang railway

Preceding station	China Railway	Following station
Xiaoqiao towards Xining	Qinghai–Tibet railway	Shuangzhai towards Lhasa
