= Keke railway station =

Railway station in China

Keke 柯柯站

General information
- Location: China
- Coordinates: 36.9843°N 98.2553°E
- Operator: Qinghai–Tibet Railway Company
- Line: Qinghai-Tibet Railway

Other information
- Station code: 43709
- Classification: third class station

History
- Opened: 1979
Location

Keke railway station is a station on the Chinese Qingzang Railway (Qinghai–Tibet Railway), located in Keke, Ulan County, Haixi Mongol and Tibetan Autonomous Prefecture, Qinghai Province, People's Republic of China. The station was built in 1979. The distance from Xining to Keke railway station is 426 km. The station is under the jurisdiction of the Qinghai–Tibet Railway Company.

== See also ==
- Qingzang Railway
- List of stations on Qingzang railway

Preceding station	China Railway	Following station
Saishike towards Xining	Qinghai–Tibet railway	Chaikai towards Lhasa
