= Fenghuoshan Tunnel =

Railway tunnel in Qinghai, China

Coordinates: 34°40′48.87″N 92°54′08.21″E

A journey through the world's highest railway tunnel

The Fenghuoshan Tunnel (simplified Chinese: 风火山隧道; traditional Chinese: 風火山隧道; pinyin: Fēnghuǒshān Suìdào; lit. 'Wind Volcano Tunnel') is the highest railway tunnel in the world. It is 1,338 metres (4,390 feet) long, and stands 4,905 meters (16,093 feet) above sea level. It is part of the Qinghai–Tibet Railway, linking Qinghai and Tibet that was completed in 2006.

The tunnel is located in the western, sparsely populated Zadoi County, Qinghai (the eastern edge of the Hoh Xil mountainous region between the Kunlun and Tanggula mountain ranges).
