= Tanggula North railway station =

Railway station in Tanggulashan, China

Coordinates: 33.0814°N 91.7739°E

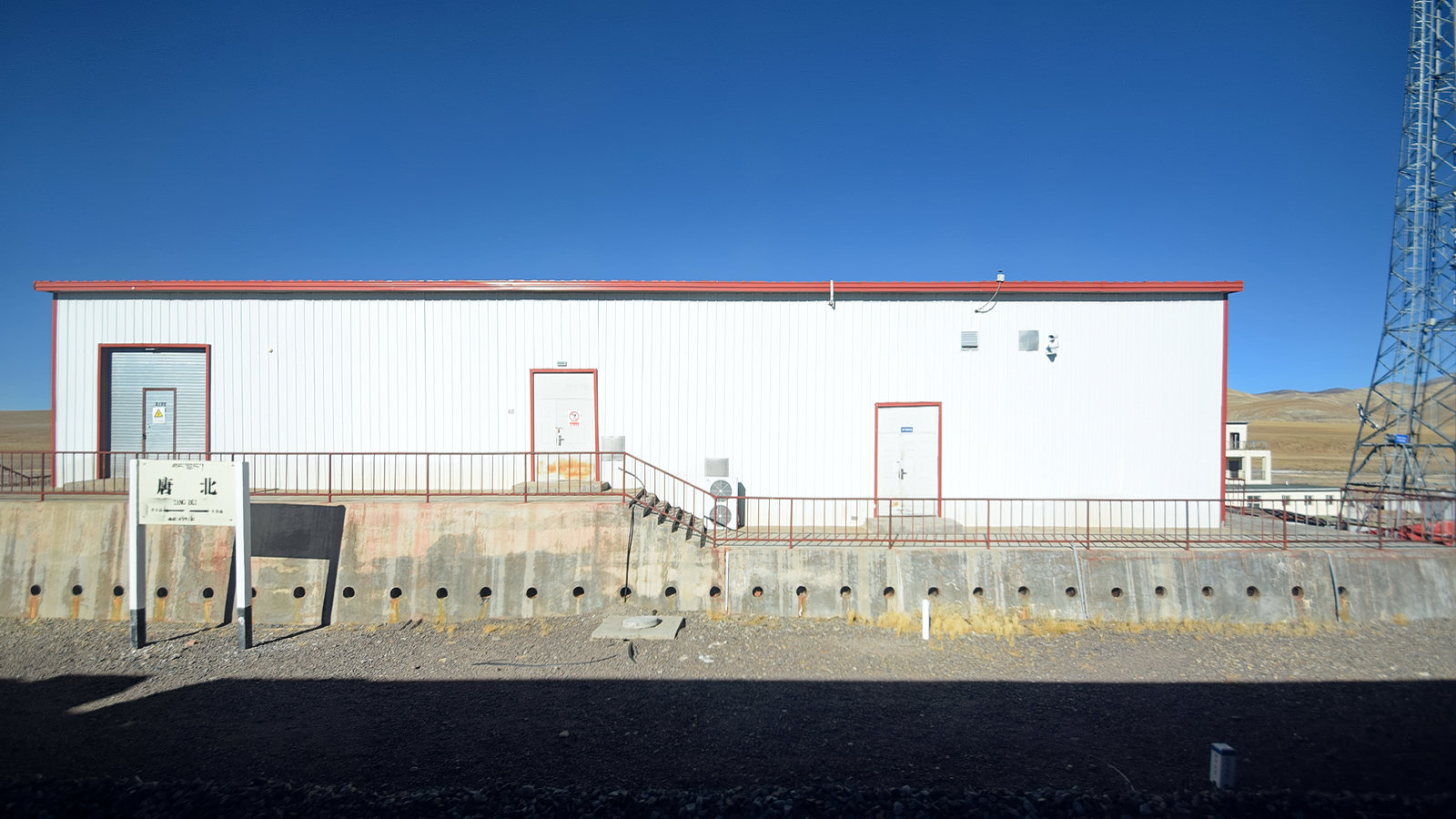
Tanggula Bei (North) Railway Station / Tang Bei Railway Station, Qinghai-Tibet Railway

Tanggula North station (唐古拉北站) is a railway station on the Chinese Qinghai–Tibet Railway. It is at an altitude of 4,951 metres (16,243 ft) above sea level. As of 2016, bottles of oxygen were regularly delivered to the station from Golmud to treat altitude sickness.

== See also ==
- List of highest railway stations in the world
- Qinghai–Tibet Railway
- List of stations on Qinghai–Tibet railway
