= Nagqu railway station =

Railway station in Tibet, China

Coordinates: 31°26′43″N 91°59′23″E

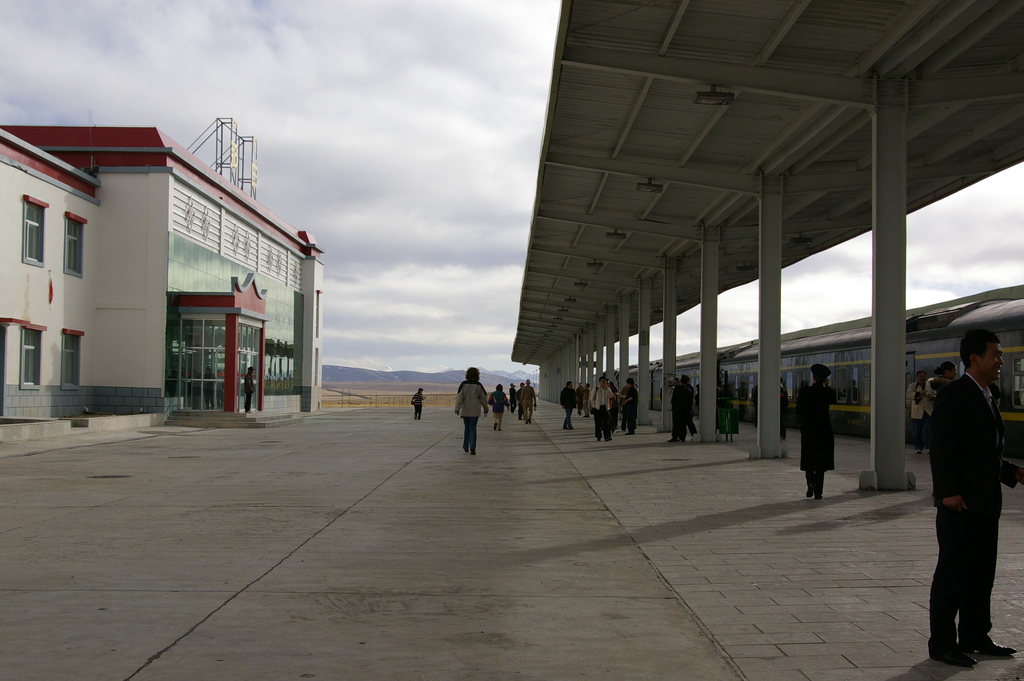
Nagqu Station

Nagqu railway station (Chinese: 那曲站; pinyin: Nàqū Zhàn), also romanized as Naqu or Nagchu, is a station on the Qinghai–Tibet Railway serving the city of Nagqu in the Tibet Autonomous Region, China. It is located at an elevation of 4,515 m (14,813 ft).

Construction of Naqu Station began in 2001, and it was put into operation on July 1, 2006, with the opening of the Golmud section of the Qinghai-Tibet Railway.

== Station layout ==
The station has a crossing loop and several goods sidings adjacent to the passenger station. The goods sidings are connected to the main line via a shunting neck which trails to Up trains (trains to Beijing).

== See also ==
- Qingzang railway
- List of stations on Qingzang railway

== Gallery ==
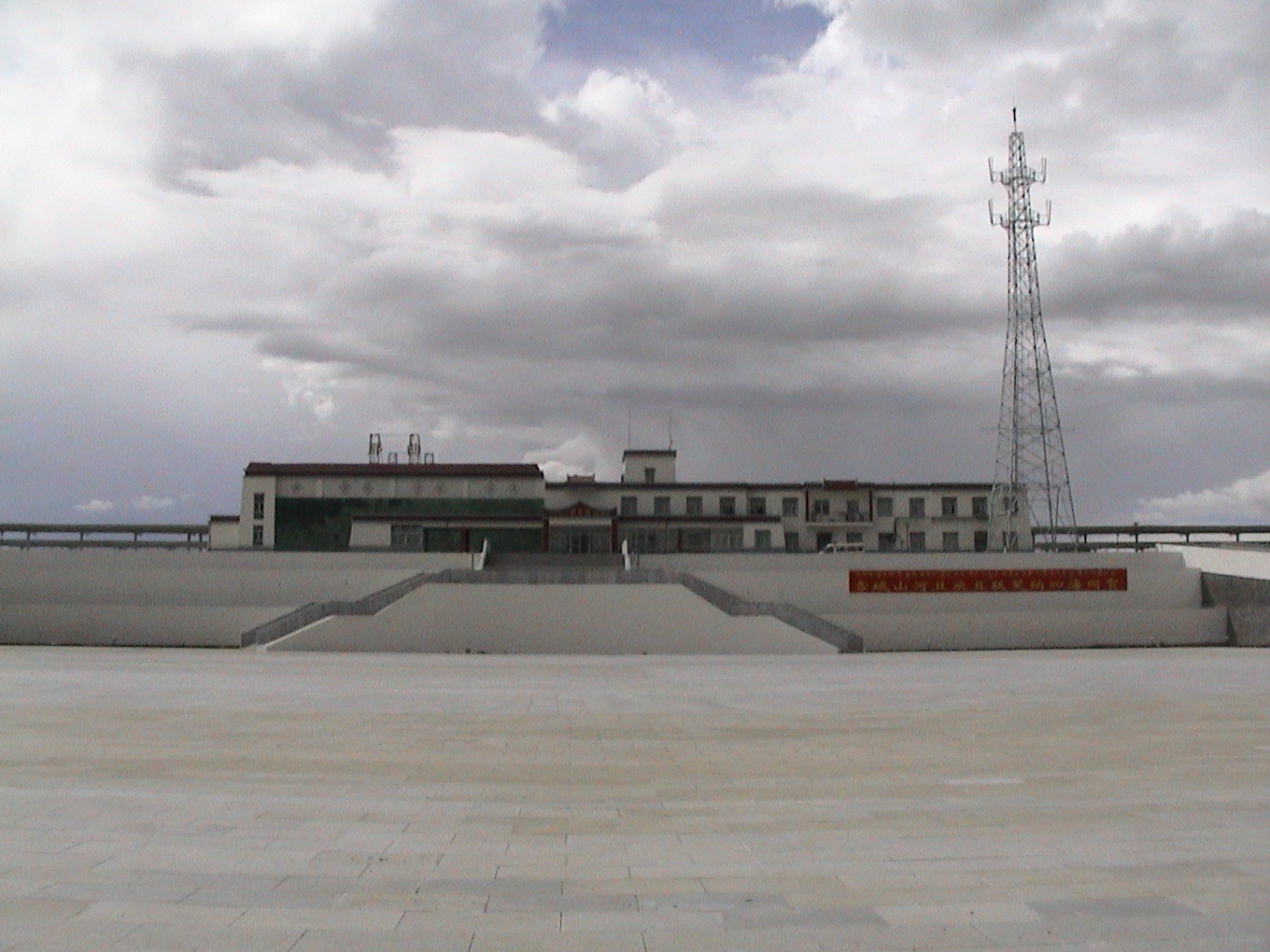
External view

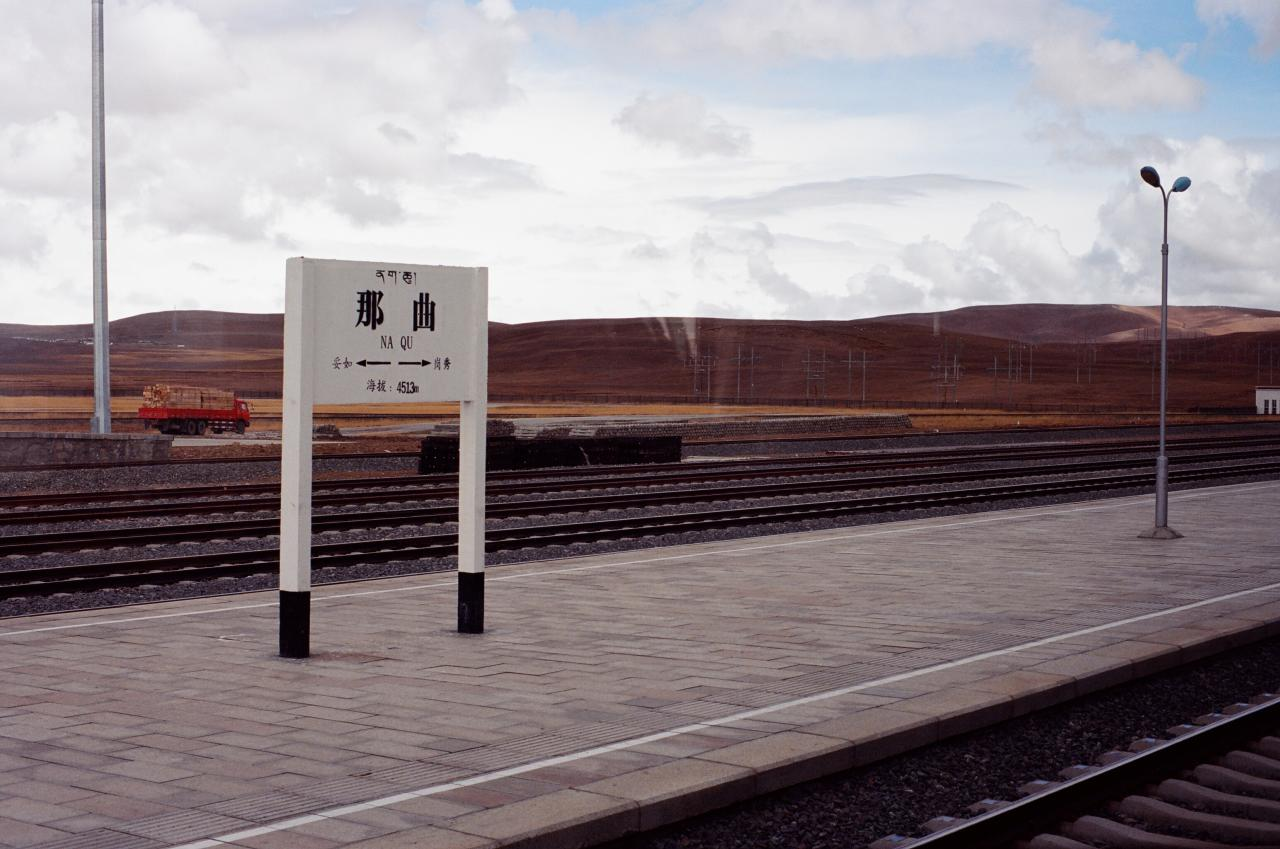
Platform

Preceding station	China Railway	Following station
Gangxiu towards Xining	Qinghai–Tibet railway	Tuoru towards Lhasa
