= Qinghai–Tibet railway =

Railway line in Tibet, China

Qinghai–Tibet railway མཚོ་བོད་ལྕགས་ལམ། 青藏铁路
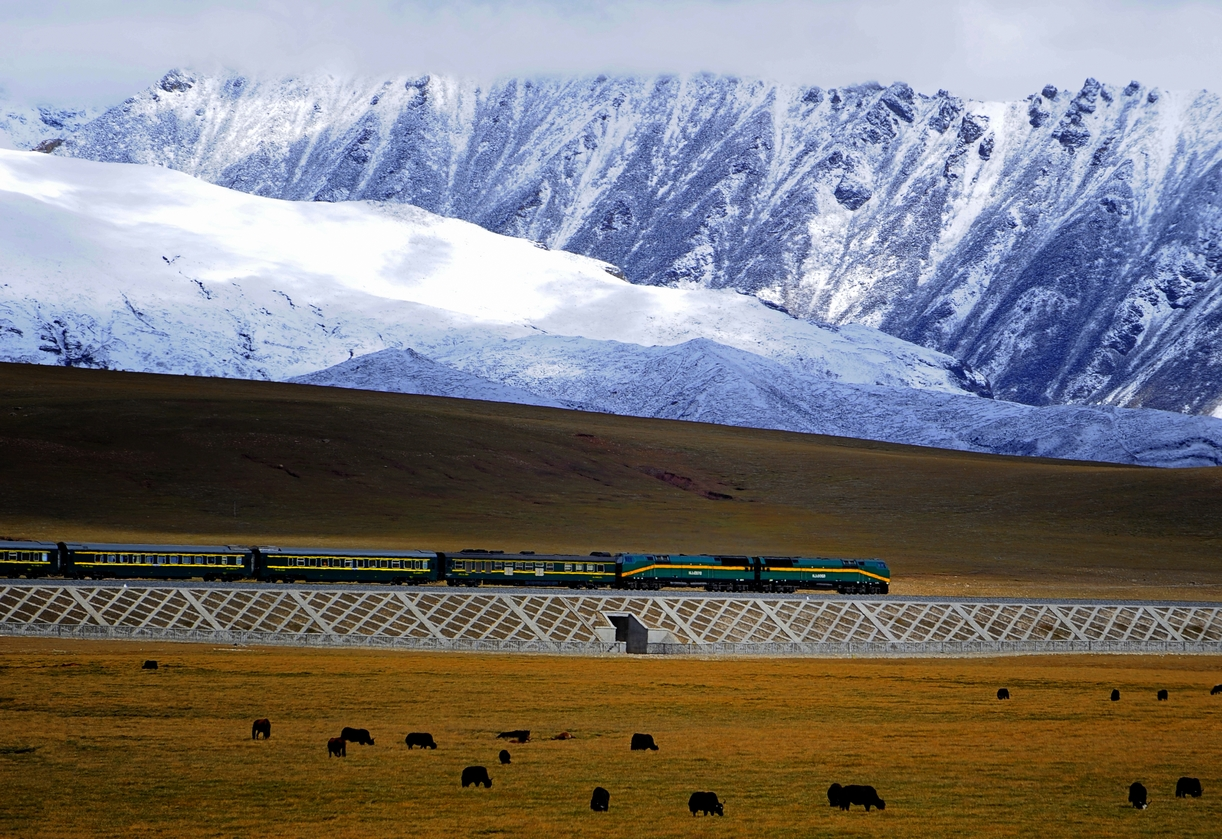
- A train pulled by a pair of NJ2 locomotives travels on the Qingzang railway in 2008

Overview
- Status: Operational
- Locale: China: Qinghai; Tibet Autonomous Region
- Coordinates: 33°00′18.50″N 91°38′57.70″E
- Termini: Xining railway station; Lhasa railway station

Service
- Type: Heavy rail
- System: China Railway
- Operator: China Railway Qingzang Group

History
- Opened: 1984 (Xining–Nanshankou); 2006 (Nanshankou–Lhasa)

Technical
- Line length: 1,956 km (1,215 mi)
- Num of tracks: 2 (Xining–Golmud); 1 (Golmud–Lhasa)
- Track gauge: 1,435 mm (4 ft 8 1/2 in) standard gauge
- Electrification: Overhead catenary 25kV 50Hz (Xining–Golmud)
- Operating speed: 160 km/h (99 mph) (Xining–Golmud); 100 km/h (62 mph) (Golmud–Lhasa)

The Qinghai–Tibet railway or Qingzang railway (Standard Tibetan: མཚོ་བོད་ལྕགས་ལམ།, mtsho bod lcags lam; simplified Chinese: 青藏铁路; traditional Chinese: 青藏鐵路; pinyin: Qīngzàng Tiělù) is a high-elevation railway line in China between Xining, Qinghai Province, and Lhasa, Tibet. With over 960 km (600 mi) of track being more than 4,000 m (13,123 ft) above sea level, it is the highest railway line in the world.

Construction began on the 815 km (506 mi) section between Xining and Golmud in 1958 and was completed in 1984; the remaining 1,142 km (710 mi) from Golmud to Lhasa started construction in 2001 and opened in 2006, making it the first railway line in Tibet. Passenger trains run from Beijing, Chengdu, Chongqing, Guangzhou, Shanghai, Xining, and Lanzhou, and can carry between 800 and 1,000 passengers during peak season.

In addition to being the world's highest railway, the line is the holder of numerous other records; the line includes the Tanggula Pass, the highest point on a railway in the world at 5,072 m (16,640 ft) above sea level, and Tanggula railway station at 5,068 m (16,627 ft) is the world's highest railway station. The 1,338 m (4,390 ft) long Fenghuoshan tunnel is the highest rail tunnel in the world at 4,905 m (16,093 ft) above sea level.

In 2022, the Chinese government announced plans for the line to be electrified. Construction started in June 2022 and was expected to take three years, at a total cost of 14.84 billion yuan.

== Construction ==
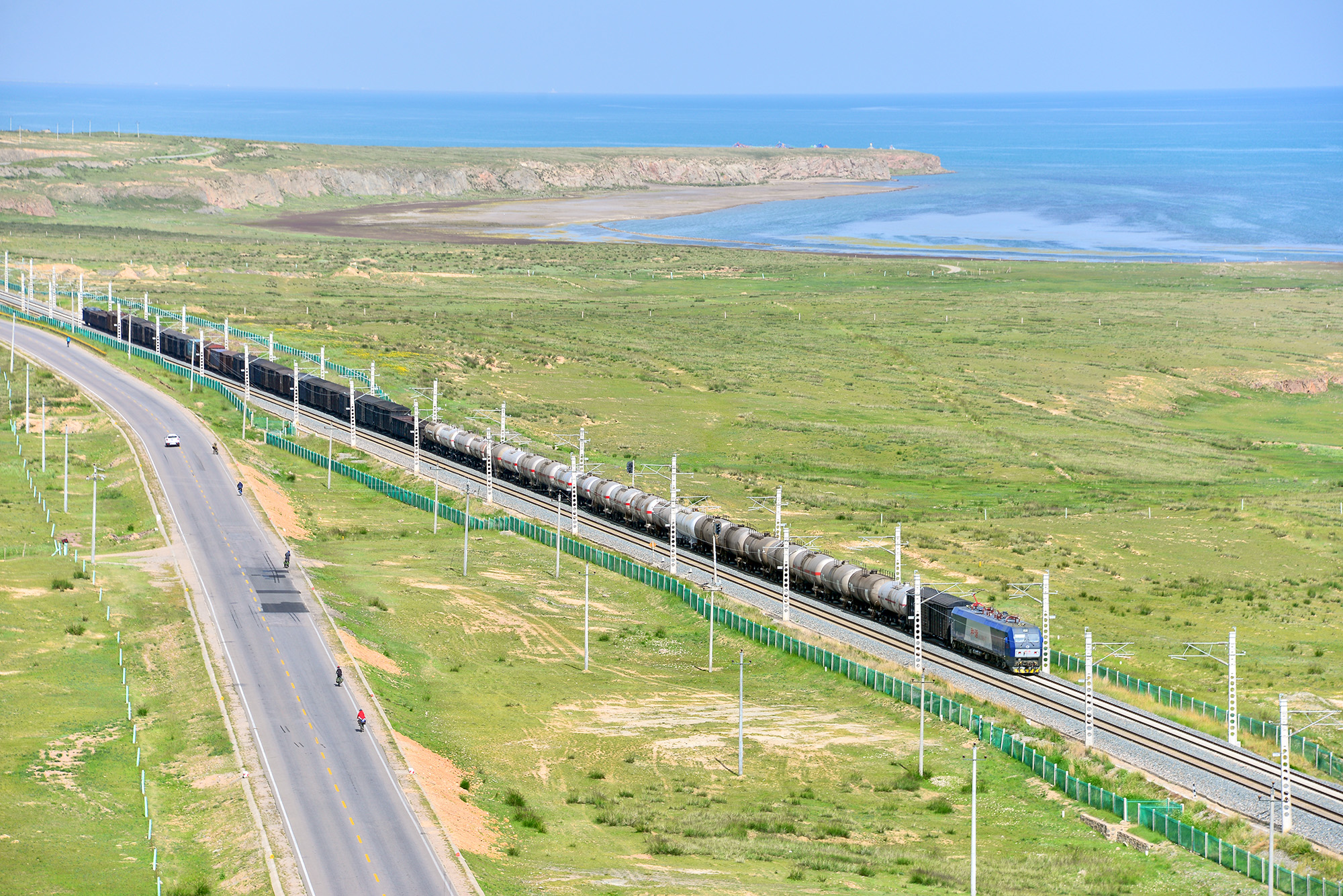
Train running along the Qinghai Lake, between Xining and Golmud

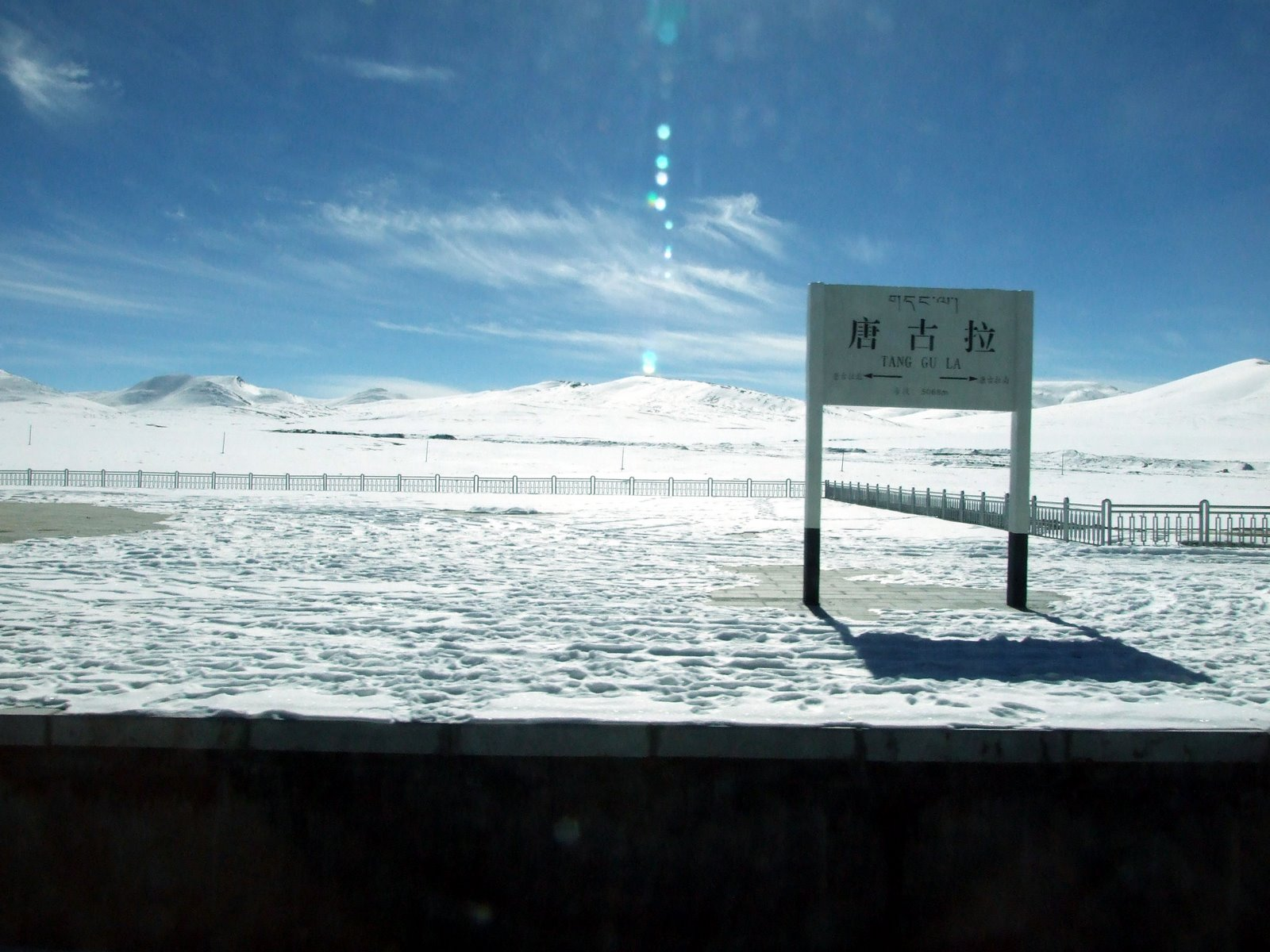
Tanggula railway station, located at 5,068 m (16,627 ft), is the highest station in the world

The capital of the Qinghai Province, Xining, became connected with the rest of the country by rail in 1959, when the Lanqing Railway from Lanzhou was completed.

The 815 km (506 mi) section of the future Qingzang Railway from Xining to Golmud, Qinghai opened to traffic in 1984. But the remaining 1,142 km (710 mi) section from Golmud to Lhasa could not be constructed until technical difficulties of building railroad tracks on permafrost were solved. This section was formally started on 29 June 2001, finished on 12 October 2005, and signaling work and track testing took another eight months. It was completed in five years at a cost of $3.68 billion.

Track-laying in Tibet was launched from both directions, towards Tanggula Mountain and Lhasa, from Amdo railway station on 22 June 2004. On 24 August 2005, track was laid at the railway's highest point, the Tanggula Pass, 5,072 m (16,640 feet) above sea level.

There are 44 stations, among them Tanggula Mountain railway station, at 5,068 m (16,627 ft) the world's highest. Peru's Ticlio railway station at 4,829 m (15,843 ft) is the highest in the Americas (Cóndor station; at 4,786 m or 15,702 ft, on the Rio Mulatos-Potosí line, Bolivia, and La Galera station at 4,777 m or 15,673 ft, in Peru, being the next highest). The Qingzang Railway project involved more than 20,000 workers and over 6,000 pieces of industrial equipment, and is one of China's major accomplishments of the 21st century.

Bombardier Transportation built 361 high-altitude passenger carriages with special enriched-oxygen and UV-protection systems, delivered between December 2005 and May 2006. Fifty-three are luxury sleeper carriages for tourist services.

The construction of the railway was part of the China Western Development strategy, an attempt to develop the western provinces of China, which are much less developed than eastern China. The railway will be extended to Zhangmu via Shigatse (日喀则) to the west, and Dali via Nyingchi (林芝) to the east. A further extension is planned to link Shigatse with Yadong near the China-India border (Map). The railway is considered one of the greatest feats in modern Chinese history by the government, and as a result, is often mentioned on regular TV programs. Chinese-Tibetan folk singer Han Hong has a song called Tianlu (Road to Heaven; 天路) praising the Qingzang Railway.

=== Completed extensions ===
On 17 August 2008, a railway spokesman confirmed plans to add six more rail lines connecting to the Qinghai–Tibet railway, including from Lhasa to Nyingchi and from Lhasa to Shigatse, both in the Tibet Autonomous Region. Three lines will originate from Golmud in Qinghai province and run to Chengdu in Sichuan province, Dunhuang in Gansu province, and Korla of the Xinjiang Uygur Autonomous Region. The sixth will link Xining, the capital of Qinghai, with Zhangye in Gansu. The six lines are expected to be in operation before 2020. Construction work of the Lhasa–Shigatse extension began on 26 September 2010; it was opened in August 2014.

The construction of Dunhuang–Golmud railway began in December 2012 and finished on 18 December 2019. This new railway extends the existed Yinmaxia station on the Qinghai–Tibet Railway 506 km (314 mi) to Dunhuang, Gansu, establishing a direct connection between Xinjiang and Tibet.

=== Addition of capacity and electrification ===
A section of the railway between Nanshan and Erlang, in Haixi Prefecture, Qinghai

Given that the Sichuan-Tibet railway is expected to be completed relatively later with less capacity, the Qinghai–Tibet railway is expected to add cargo capacity to fulfill the demand of material transportation. 13 stations along the Qinghai–Tibet railway have received extensions of sidings or passing loops, or these were built from scratch. This will allow the daily train received from Lhasa Railway station to expand from 6 to 12–14. An electrification feasibility study is also in progress.

=== Connection to Nepal ===
In a meeting between Chinese and Nepalese officials on 25 April 2008, the Chinese delegation announced the intention to extend the Qingzang railway originally to Zhangmu (Nepali: Khasa) on the Nepalese border. Nepal had requested that the railway be extended to enable trade and tourism between the two nations. The section Lhasa-Shigatse opened in August 2014. In June 2018, China and Nepal signed a series of agreements including the construction of Shigatse-Kathmandu railway during Nepali prime minister Oli's visit to China.

China plans to extend this railway up to Lake Paiku/Gyirong, which is around 60 km from the Rasuwa border crossing. Construction of the railway from Shigatse to Gyirong is expected to start in 2025. The final part of the whole infrastructure will be the Gyirong-Kathmandu railway.

== Route ==
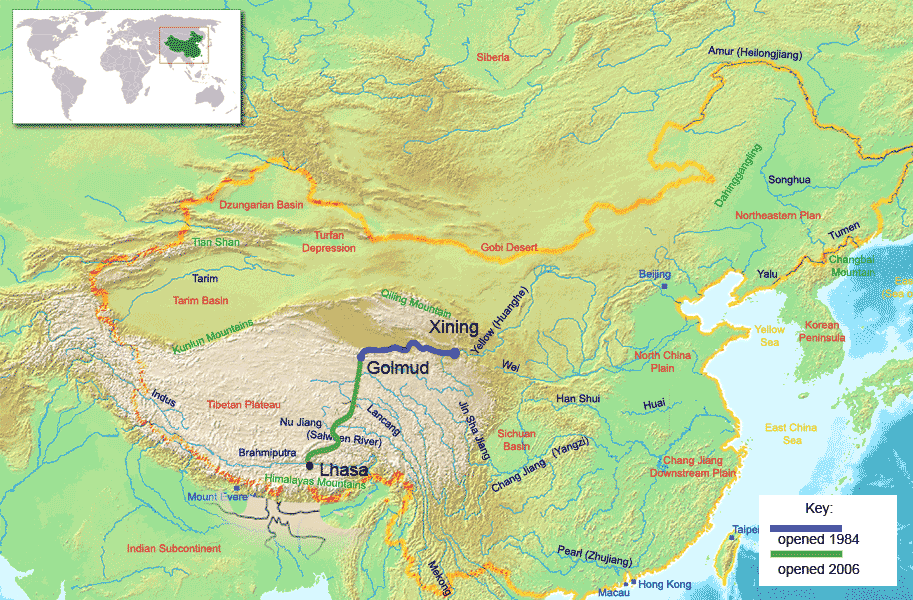
Map of the Qinghai-Tibet Railway

Within the Golmud to Lhasa section of the line there are 45 stations, 38 of which are unstaffed and monitored by the control center in Xining. Thirteen more stations are planned.

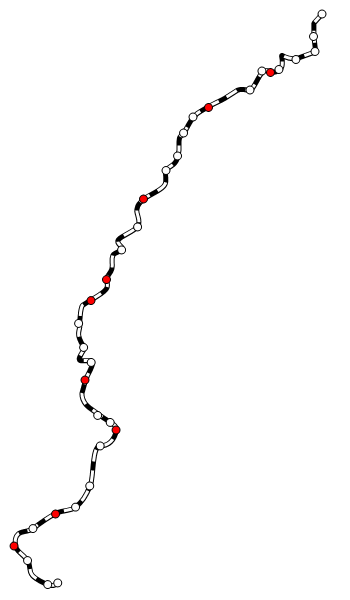

The 4,010 m (13,160 ft) New Guanjiao Tunnel is the longest tunnel between Xining and Golmud, and the 3,345 m (10,974 ft) Yangbajing tunnel is the longest tunnel between Golmud and Lhasa. More than 960 km (600 mi), over 80% of the Golmud–Lhasa section, is at an elevation of more than 4,000 m (13,123 ft). There are 675 bridges, totalling 160 km (99 mi); about 550 km (340 mi) of track is laid on permafrost.

=== Existing stations ===
At 5,068 metres (16,627 ft) above sea level Tanggula railway station is the highest railway station in the world as of October 2024. The second through fifth and tenth highest stations (Tanggula North, Tanggula South, Tuoju, Zhajiazangbu and Jiangkedong respectively) are also on this line.

| English name | Chinese name | Distance from Xining in km (mi) | Coordinates | Altitude |
|---|---|---|---|---|
| Xining; Lanzhou–Qinghai railway | 西宁 | | 36.61713°N 101.77822°E | 2,200 m (7,218 ft) |
| Xiaoqiao | 小桥 | | | 2,275 m (7,464 ft) |
| Xining West | 西宁西 | 12 km (7.5 mi) | 36.65778°N 101.68736°E | 2,282 m (7,487 ft) |
| Shuangzhai | 双寨 | 24 km (15 mi) | | 2,285 m (7,497 ft) |
| Zhamalong | 扎麻隆 | 35 km (22 mi) | | 2,340 m (7,677 ft) |
| Shiyazhuang | 石崖庄 | 48 km (30 mi) | | 2,380 m (7,808 ft) |
| Tongkor | 湟源 | 58 km (36 mi) | 36.68384°N 101.23963°E | 2,650 m (8,690 ft) |
| Shenzhong | 申中 | 67 km (42 mi) | | |
| Bayan | 巴燕 | 77 km (48 mi) | | |
| Yuejiacun | 岳家村 | 85 km (53 mi) | | |
| Haiyan | 海晏 | 97 km (60 mi) | 36.86703°N 100.99359°E | 3,074 m (10,085 ft) |
| Huangcaozhuang | 黄草庄 | 108 km (67 mi) | | |
| Ketu | 克土 | 122 km (76 mi) | | |
| Qinghaihu | 青海湖 | 133 km (83 mi) | | |
| Tol | 托勒 | 147 km (91 mi) | | |
| Garzê River | 甘孜河 | 162 km (101 mi) | | |
| Hargai | 哈尔盖 | 177 km (110 mi) | 37.18308°N 100.41576°E | 3,248 m (10,656 ft) |
| Gangcha | 刚察 | 208 km (129 mi) | 37.24375°N 100.09843°E | 3,238 m (10,623 ft) |
| Huangyu | 黄玉 | 223 km (139 mi) | | |
| Niaodao | 鸟岛 | | | |
| Jirmeng | 吉尔孟 | 251 km (156 mi) | | |
| Jianghe | 江河 | 266 km (165 mi) | | |
| Tianpeng | 天棚 | 290 km (180 mi) | | |
| Lumang | 鹿芒 | 311 km (193 mi) | | |
| Tianjun | 天峻 | 311 km (193 mi) | | |
| Nanshan | 南山 | 330 km (210 mi) | | |
| Erlang | 二郎 | 342 km (213 mi) | | |
| Chahannuo | 察汗诺 | 364 km (226 mi) | | |
| Gaba | 尕巴 | 397 km (247 mi) | | |
| Ulan | 乌兰 | 407 km (253 mi) | 36.95397°N 98.46755°E | 3,017 m (9,898 ft) |
| Saishike | 赛什克 | 411 km (255 mi) | | |
| Keke | 柯柯 | 426 km (265 mi) | 36.98391°N 98.25511°E | 2,966 m (9,731 ft) |
| Chaikai | 柴凯 | 448 km (278 mi) | | |
| Taoli | 陶力 | 474 km (295 mi) | | |
| Gahai | 尕海 | 498 km (309 mi) | | |
| Delingha | 德令哈 | 521 km (324 mi) | 37.314287°N 97.38301°E | 2,945 m (9,662 ft) |
| Denong | 德农 | 523 km (325 mi) | | |
| Gebi | 戈碧 | 548 km (341 mi) | | |
| Lianhu | 连湖 | 563 km (350 mi) | | |
| Quanshuiliang | 泉水梁 | 583 km (362 mi) | | |
| Pingshuang | 平爽 | 607 km (377 mi) | | |
| Hangya | 航垭 | 639 km (397 mi) | | |
| Dachaidan East; Golmud-Dunhuang Railway | 大柴旦东 | 675 km (419 mi) | 37.32396°N 95.87227°E | 3,151 m (10,338 ft) |
| Xitieshan | 锡铁山 | 699 km (434 mi) | 37.25768°N 95.63723°E | 2,996 m (9,829 ft) |
| Songrugou | 松如沟 | 711 km (442 mi) | | |
| Dabsun | 达布逊 | 750 km (470 mi) | 36°55′9″N 95°21′49″E | |
| Qarhan; A private branch to Zannge Potash Co. | 察尔汗 | 764 km (475 mi) | 36.81032°N 95.30416°E | 2,687 m (8,816 ft) |
| Yushui River | 鱼水河 | 797 km (495 mi) | | |
| Golmud East | 格尔木东 | 808 km (502 mi) | 36°25′08″N 94°55′25″E | |
| Golmud | 格尔木 | 830 km (520 mi) | 36°22′58″N 94°54′21″E | 2,829 m (9,281 ft) |
| Nanshankou | 南山口 | 857 km (533 mi) | 36°11′34″N 94°46′46″E | |
| Ganlong | 甘隆 | 881 km (547 mi) | 35°59′33″N 94°49′05″E | |
| Nachitai | 纳赤台 | 914 km (568 mi) | 35°52.4′N 94°32.2′E | |
| Xiaonanchuan | 小南川 | 937 km (582 mi) | 35°51′37″N 94°20′47″E | |
| Yuzhufeng | 玉珠峰 | 955 km (593 mi) | 35°43′47″N 94°18′27″E | |
| Wangkun | 望昆 | 973 km (605 mi) | 35°42′53″N 94°06′47″E | |
| Budongquan | 不冻泉 | 1,010 km (630 mi) | 35°31.2′N 93°54.3′E | |
| Chumar River | 楚玛尔河 | 1,056 km (656 mi) | 35°22.6′N 93°29.2′E | |
| Wudaoliang | 五道梁 | 1,100 km (680 mi) | 35°11′41″N 93°04′43″E | |
| Xiushui River | 秀水河 | 1,138 km (707 mi) | | |
| Jiangkedong | 江克栋 | 1,174 km (729 mi) | | 4,778 m (15,676 ft) |
| Riachiqu | 日阿尺曲 | 1,196 km (743 mi) | | |
| Wuli | 乌丽 | 1,220 km (760 mi) | | |
| Tuotuo River | 沱沱河 | 1,239 km (770 mi) | | |
| Kaixinling | 开心岭 | 1,260 km (780 mi) | | |
| Tongtianhe | 通天河 | 1,281 km (796 mi) | | |
| Tanggang | 塘岗 | 1,309 km (813 mi) | | |
| Yanshiping | 雁石坪 | 1,334 km (829 mi) | | |
| Bumade | 布玛德 | 1,356 km (843 mi) | | |
| Buqiangge | 布强格 | 1,380 km (860 mi) | | 4,823 m (15,823 ft) |
| Tanggula North | 唐古拉北 | 1,404 km (872 mi) | | 4,950 m (16,240 ft) |
| Tanggula | 唐古拉 | 1,421 km (883 mi) | 32°53′5″N 91°55′6″E | 5,068 m (16,627 ft) |
| Tanggula South | 唐古拉南 | 1,441 km (895 mi) | | 4,950 m (16,240 ft) |
| Za'gyazangbo | 扎加藏布 | 1,460 km (910 mi) | | 4,886 m (16,030 ft) |
| Tuoju | 托居 | 1,499 km (931 mi) | | 4,890 m (16,040 ft) |
| Amdo | 安多 | 1,524 km (947 mi) | 32°15′8″N 91°39′57″E | |
| Cuona Lake | 措那湖 | 1,553 km (965 mi) | 32.0343465°N 91.5343443°E | 4,594 m (15,072 ft) |
| Liantong River | 联通河 | 1,574 km (978 mi) | | |
| Dongqen | 底吾玛 | 1,593 km (990 mi) | | |
| Gangxiu | 岗秀 | 1,632 km (1,014 mi) | | |
| Nagqu | 那曲 | 1,650 km (1,030 mi) | 31°26′45″N 91°59′21″E | 4,513 m (14,806 ft) |
| Tuoru | 妥如 | 1,691 km (1,051 mi) | | |
| Sangxiong | 桑雄 | 1,713 km (1,064 mi) | | |
| Gulog | 古露 | 1,735 km (1,078 mi) | | |
| Umathang | 乌玛塘 | 1,775 km (1,103 mi) | | |
| Damxung | 当雄 | 1,808 km (1,123 mi) | 30°27.6′N 91°04.8′E | 4,293 m (14,085 ft) |
| Dhachugo | 达琼果 | 1,845 km (1,146 mi) | | |
| Yangbaling | 羊八林 | 1,864 km (1,158 mi) | | |
| Yangbajing | 羊八井 | 1,881 km (1,169 mi) | | |
| Angga | 昂嘎 | 1,901 km (1,181 mi) | | |
| Maxiang | 马乡 | 1,913 km (1,189 mi) | | |
| Gurong | 古荣 | 1,930 km (1,200 mi) | | |
| Lhasa West | 拉萨西 | 1,953 km (1,214 mi) | 29°38′38″N 90°58′00″E | |
| Lhasa; Lhasa–Xigazê railway Sichuan–Tibet railway | 拉萨 | 1,972 km (1,225 mi) | 29°37′30″N 91°04′07″E | |

== Trains and tickets ==
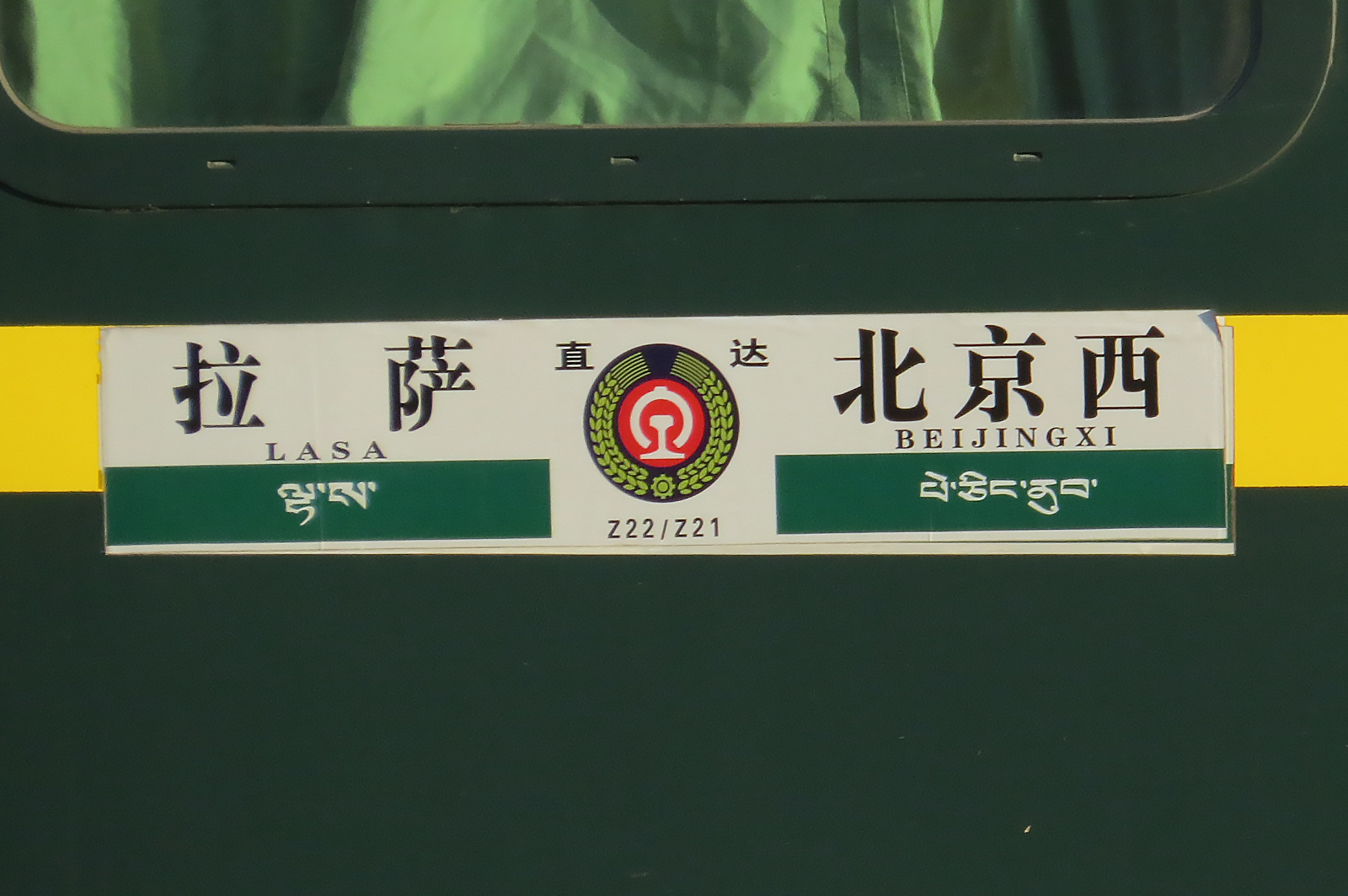
Line Z21/Z22 serves between Beijing West railway station and Lhasa railway station

The trains are specially built for high-elevation environments. The diesel locomotives for cargo were built by CSR Qishuyan (DF8B-9000 Series) and by CNR Erqi Locomotive (DF7G-8000 Series), and the locomotives for passenger transportation were built by GE in Pennsylvania (NJ2), and the passenger carriages are Chinese-made 25T carriages: on train Z21/Z22, between Beijing West and Lhasa, Bombardier Sifang Transportation (BSP) made carriages on the Golmud-Lhasa section in deep green/yellow or deep red/yellow. Signs in the carriages are in Tibetan, Chinese, and English. The operational speed is 120 km/h (75 mph) and 100 km/h (62 mph) over sections laid on permafrost.

The railway from Golmud to Lhasa was completed on 12 October 2005, and it opened to regular trial service on 1 July 2006.

The locomotives are turbocharged to combat the power-reducing effect of having to run on about half an atmosphere of air due to extreme altitude.

At the beginning, only three trains ran: Beijing–Lhasa (every day), Chengdu/Chongqing–Lhasa (every other day), and Lanzhou/Xining–Lhasa. Shanghai/Guangzhou–Lhasa services were added in October 2006. In July 2010, the Shanghai–Lhasa service became daily, and a daily service between Xining and Lhasa was added, but the service was then suspended for the winter season.

Since October 2006, five pairs of passenger trains run between Golmud and Lhasa, and one more pair between Xining and Golmud. The line has a capacity of eight pairs of passenger trains.

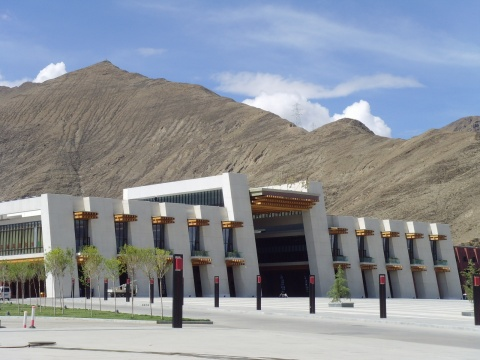
Lhasa railway station

=== Oxygen supply and medical issues ===
The passenger carriages used on Lhasa trains are specially built and have an oxygen supply for each passenger. Every passenger train has a doctor.

A Passenger Health Registration Card is required to take the train between Golmud and Lhasa. The card can be obtained when purchasing the ticket. Passengers must read the health notice for high-elevation travel and sign the agreement on the card to take the train. On 28 August 2006, a 75-year-old Hong Kong man was reported to be the first passenger to die on the train, after he had suffered heart problems in Lhasa but insisted on travelling to Xining.

== Engineering challenges ==
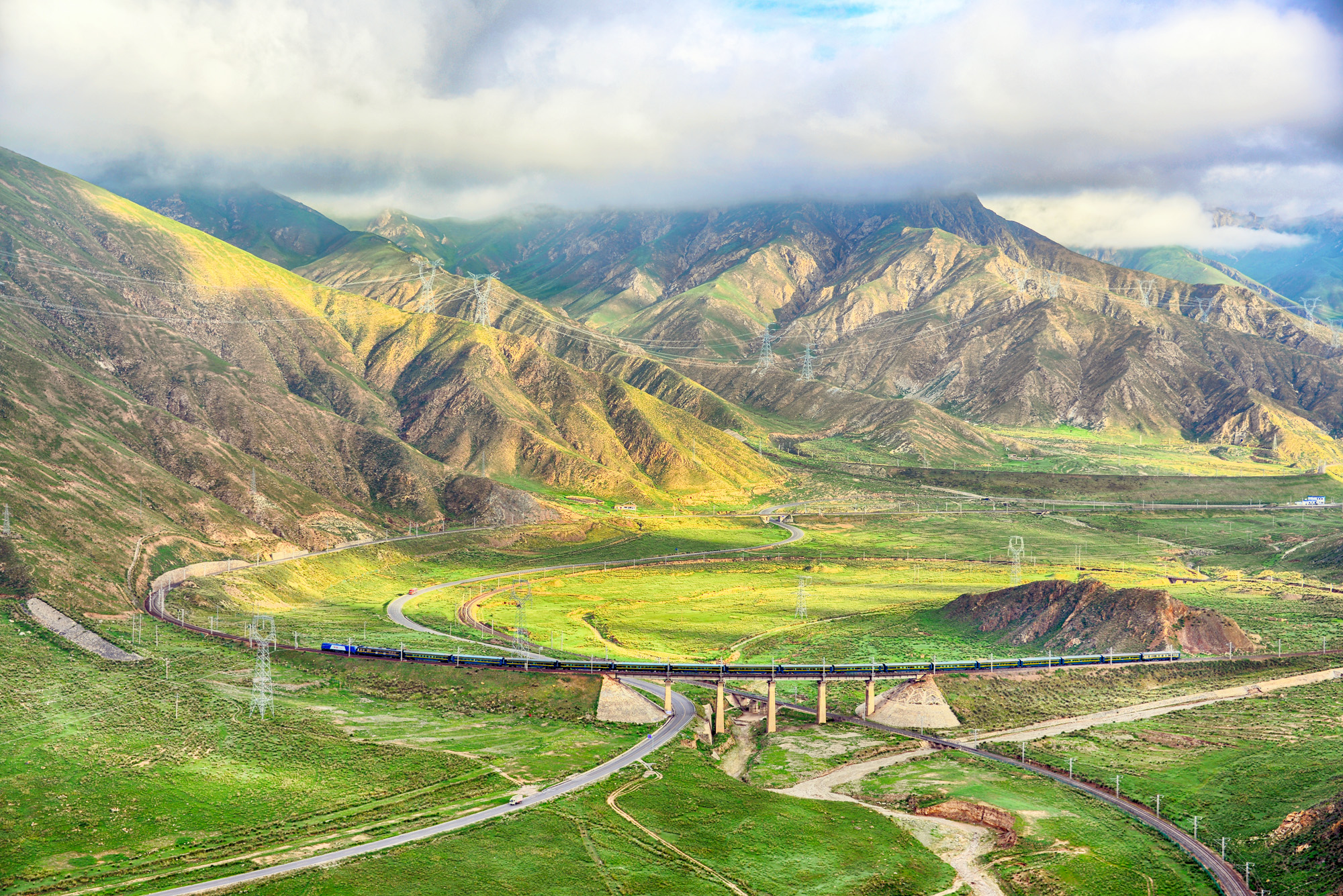
Spiral loop at Guanjiao, Qinghai

There are many technical difficulties for such a railway. About half of the second section was built on barely permanent permafrost. In the summer, the uppermost layer thaws, and the ground becomes muddy. The heat from the trains passing above is able to melt the permafrost even with a small change in temperature. The main engineering challenge, aside from oxygen shortages, is the weakness of the permafrost. For areas of permafrost that are not very fragile, an embankment of large rocks is sufficient. Meanwhile, in the most fragile areas, the rail bed must be elevated like a bridge. The engineers dealt with this problem in the areas of weakest permafrost by building elevated tracks with pile-driven foundations sunk deep into the ground. Similar to the Trans-Alaska Pipeline System, portions of the track are also passively cooled with ammonia-based heat exchangers.

Due to climate change, temperatures in the Tibetan Plateau may be considered to increase by an estimated two to three degrees Celsius. This change is sufficient to melt the permafrost and thereby affect the integrity of the entire system. The effects of climate change on the railway have yet to be seen.

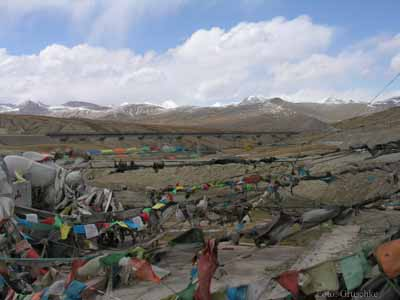
Kunlun Pass

The air in Tibet is much thinner, with oxygen partial pressure being 35% to 40% below that at sea level. Special passenger carriages are used, and several oxygen factories were built along the railway. Each seat in the train is equipped with an oxygen supply outlet for any possible emergency. The Chinese government claimed that no construction workers died during the construction due to altitude sickness related diseases. The railway passes the Kunlun Mountains, an earthquake zone. The 7.8 M_{w} Kunlun earthquake struck in 2001 (but caused no fatalities). Dozens of earthquake monitors have been installed along the railway.

== Impact ==
=== Economic ===
With limited industrial capacity in Tibet, the Tibetan economy heavily relies on industrial products from more developed parts of China. Transport of goods in and out of Tibet was mostly through the Qingzang Highway connecting Tibet to the adjacent Qinghai province, which was built in the early 1950s. The length and terrain have limited the capacity of the highway, with less than 1 million tons of goods transported each year. With the construction of the Qingzang railway, the cost of transportation of both passengers and goods should be greatly reduced, allowing for an increase in volume—the cost per tonne-kilometer will be reduced from 0.38 RMB to 0.12 RMB. It is projected that by 2010, 2.8 million tons will be carried to and from Tibet, with over 75% carried by the railway. Before the railway, the purchasing power of 100 RMB in Lhasa was only commensurate with 54 RMB in coastal regions of China, mainly due to high transport costs. The railway could elevate living standards along the route.

=== Social ===
Environmentalists and Tibetan independence activists protested against the construction of the railway. The Tibetan government-in-exile believes that the line and the further expansion of the rail network will contribute to further influx of Chinese people, the de-nationalization of Tibetans and the depletion of the region's natural resources. In 2008, the International Campaign for Tibet said the Qinghai–Tibet railway was marginalising ethnic Tibetans and "accelerating an influx of Han Chinese into the region".

According to Chinese state news agency Xinhua News, the Qingzang railway has promoted the inheritance of Tibetan culture and religion, as the opening of the railway has increased the number of worshippers from all over the country coming to Lhasa. It also advantages Tibetans with accessibility to the rest part of China for tertiary education, employment, and market for local industries. Qiangba Puncog, former Chairman of the Tibet Autonomous Region People's Government, has appreciated the railway for introducing more tourism industries to the region with jobs for the local people.

=== Environmental ===
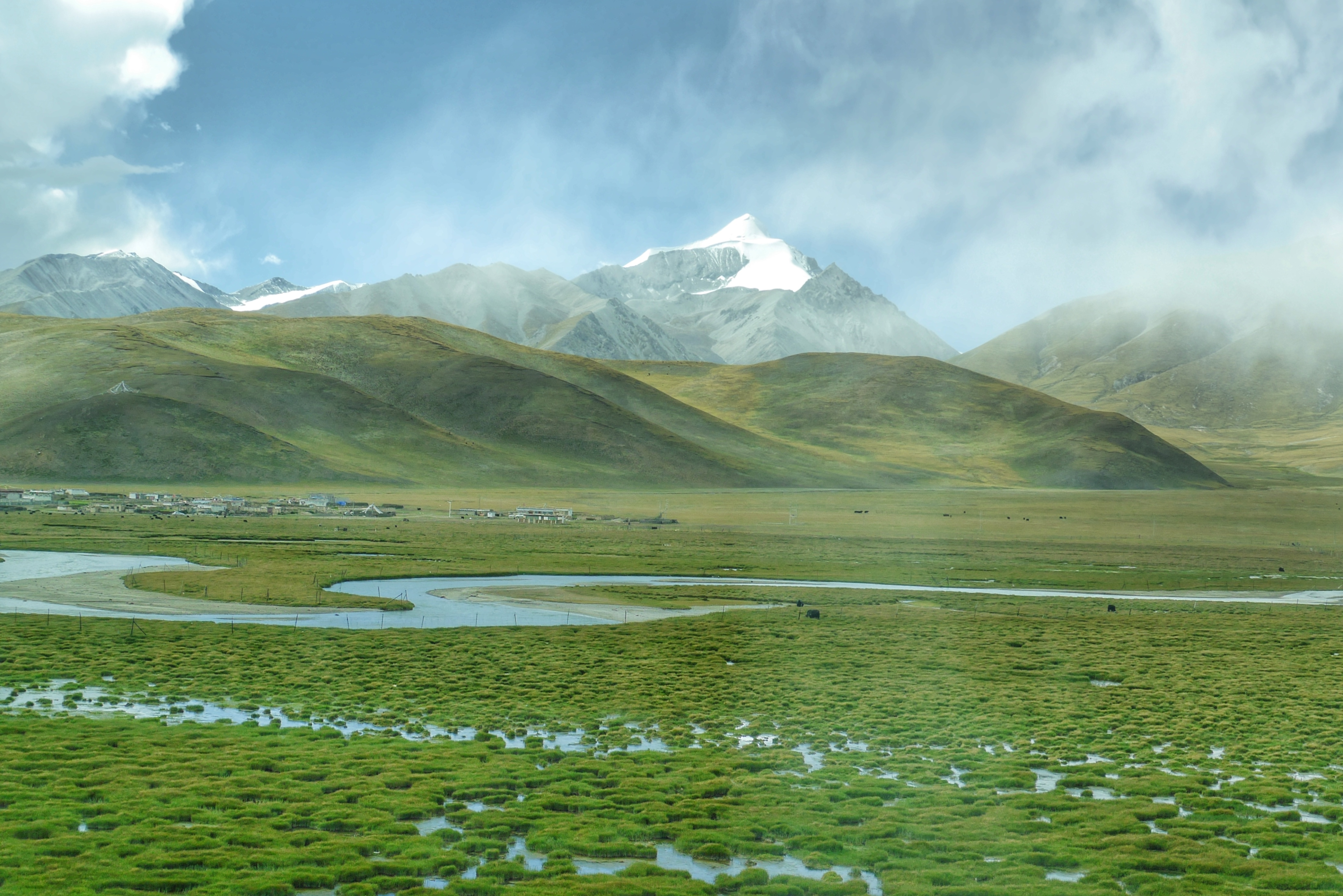
Wetland by the railway, near the Nyenchen Tanglha Mountains

The environmental impact of the new railway is an ongoing concern. The increase in passenger traffic will result in greater tourism and economic activity on the Tibetan Plateau, and the construction of the railway may also negatively impact the local environment. For example, interference on earth, vegetation, and surface water heat exchange, which may cause freeze-thaw erosion and melting of ice if not handled properly. To reduce the interference, trash and excrement on the trains are collected into two sealed containers in each car, instead of disposing them on the tracks, and are taken out at large stations. There are also concerns from the China Meteorological Administration that melting, due to global warming, of the permafrost in Tibet on which part of the railway is placed may threaten the railway within the 21st century.

The effects of this railway on wild animals such as Tibetan antelope and plants are currently unknown. 33 wildlife crossing railway bridges were constructed specifically to allow continued animal migration.

=== Military ===
Commentators have noted the potential military impact of this railway as permitting the People's Liberation Army more rapid troop mobilization to certain border areas in dispute with India.

== Rolling stock ==
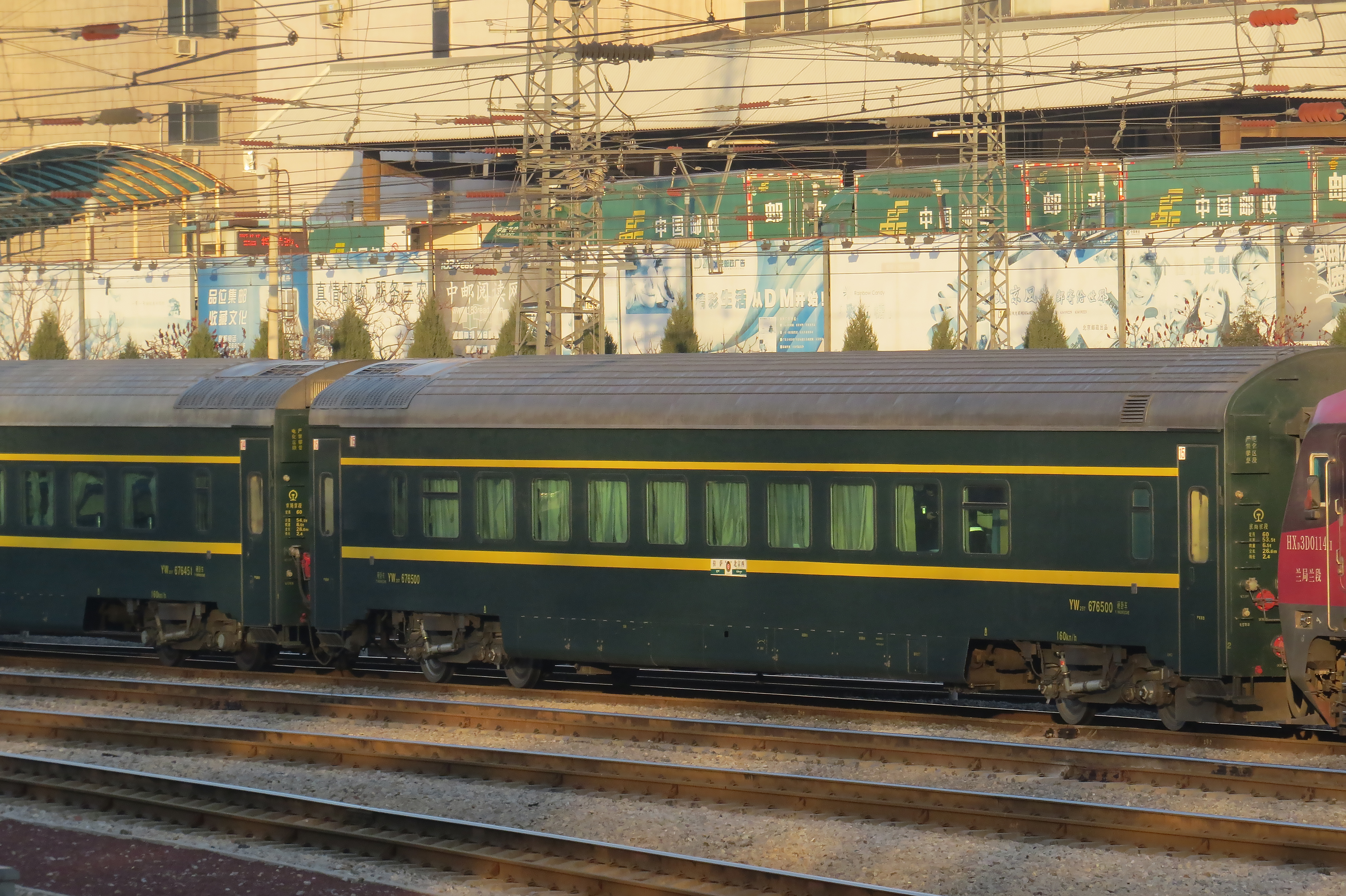
Specially built plateau coaches at Beijing West railway station, arriving from Lhasa as Z22

- 361 Bombardier Sifang Power (Qingdao) Transportation Ltd./Power Corporation of Canada/China South Locomotive and Rolling Stock Industry (Group) Corporation High-Grade Coach – 308 standard cars and 53 special tourist cars
- GE Transportation NJ2 locomotive (78 GE designation C38AChe locomotives were built)
- CSR Qishuyan & CSR Ziyang Locomotive Factory DF8B-9000 series and DF8BJ locomotive – similar to the Bombardier Transportation-GE Transportation Blue Tiger diesel electric locomotive; production of DF8B-9000 series were suspended by former Chinese corrupted official Liu Zhijun in favor of GE and EMD locomotives
- CNR Erqi Locomotive DF7G-8000 series locomotive
- CRRC Dalian HXN3 locomotive

== Scenery along the railway ==
Since the opening of Qingzang Railway, scenery as viewed from the railway has become internationally famous:

Xining to Golmud:

- Qinghai Lake

Golmud to Lhasa:

- Kunlun Pass, the east part of Kunlun Mountains (Hoh Xil Mountains to Bayan Har Mountains), Yuzhu Peak and its Glacier
- Fenghuoshan Tunnel
- Kekexili Grassland
- Tuotuo River Bridge
- Tanggula railway station, Tanggula Mountains
- Amdo Grassland
- Tsonag Lake
- Nagchu Grassland
- Nyenchen Tanglha Mountains
- Damxung Grassland
- Lhasa River Bridge

== Gallery ==
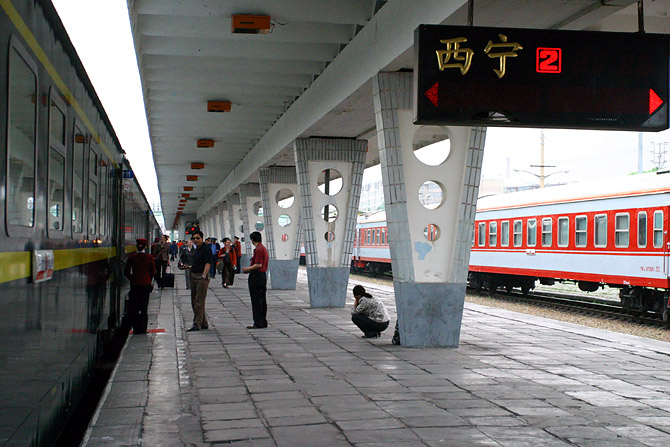
Xining railway station

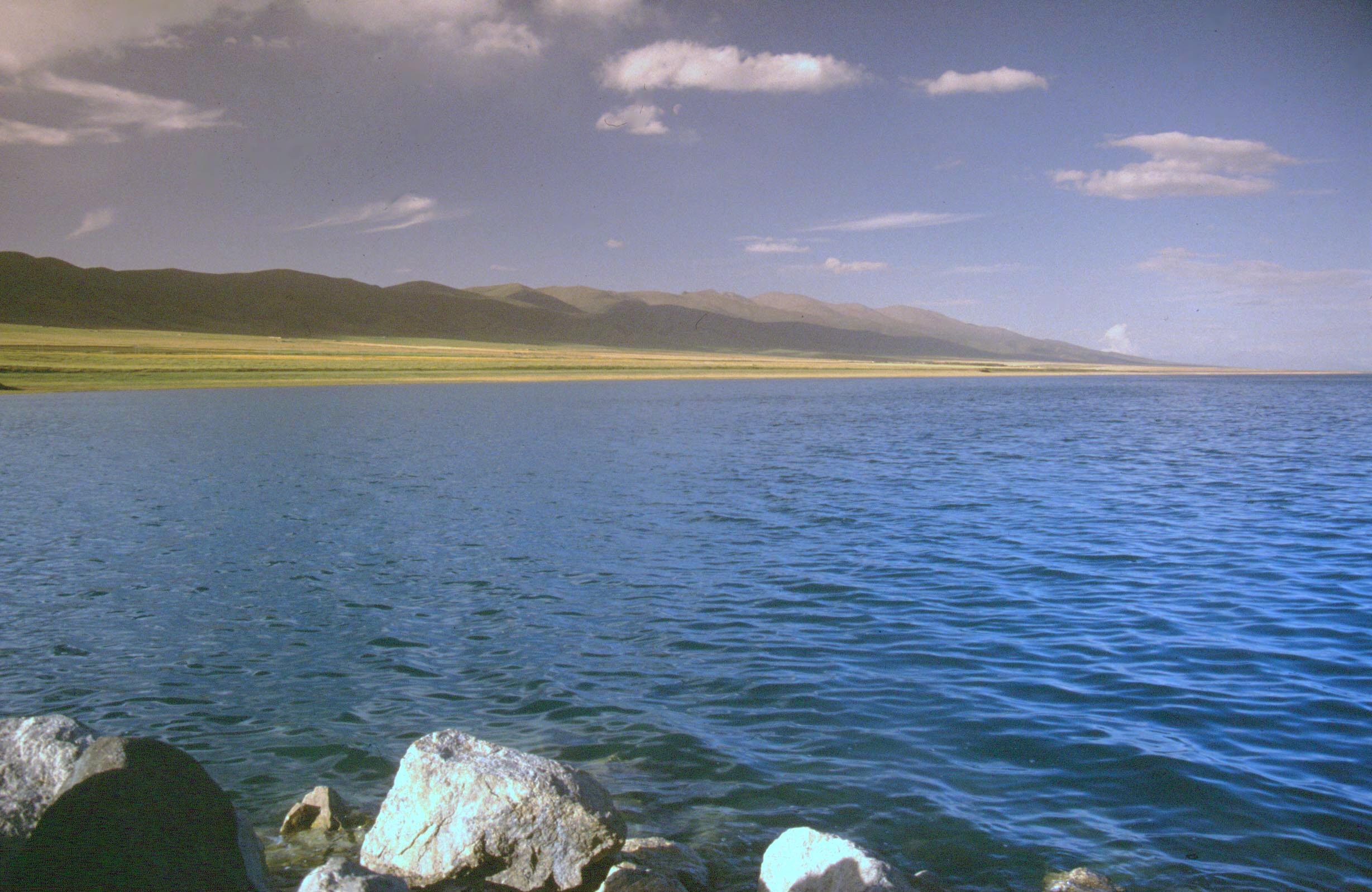
Qinghai Lake

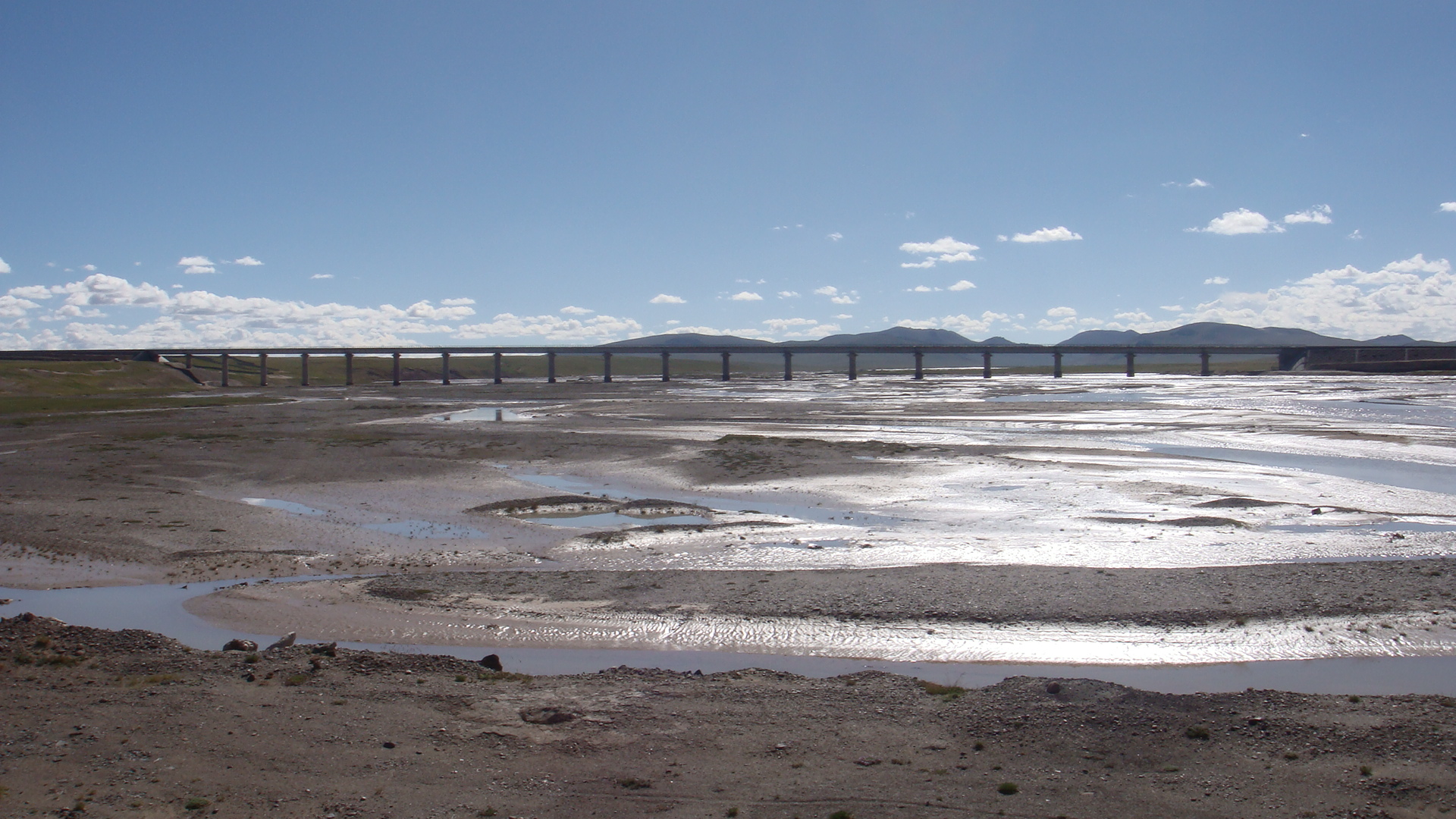
Bridge over the Tongtian River

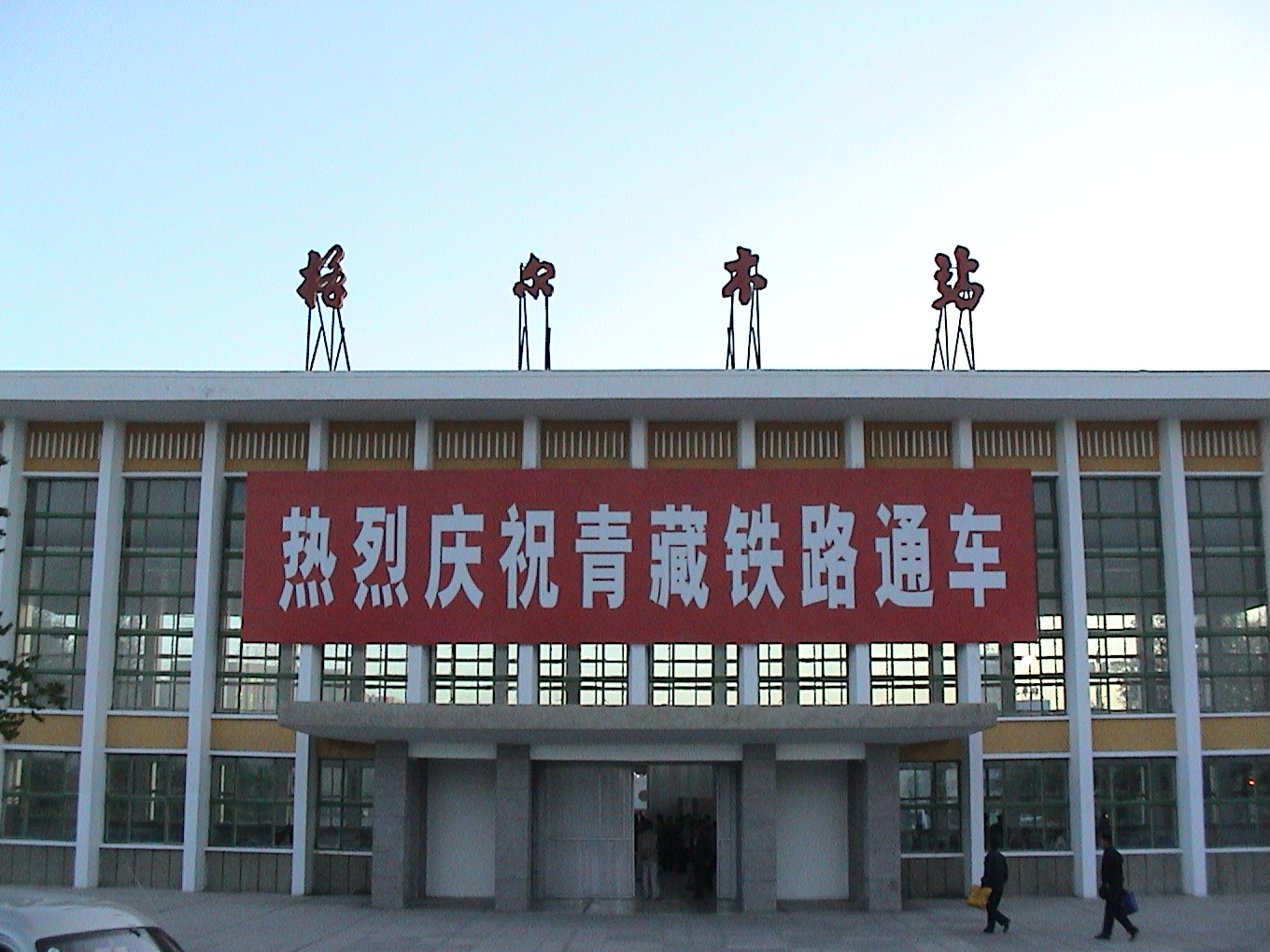
Golmud railway station

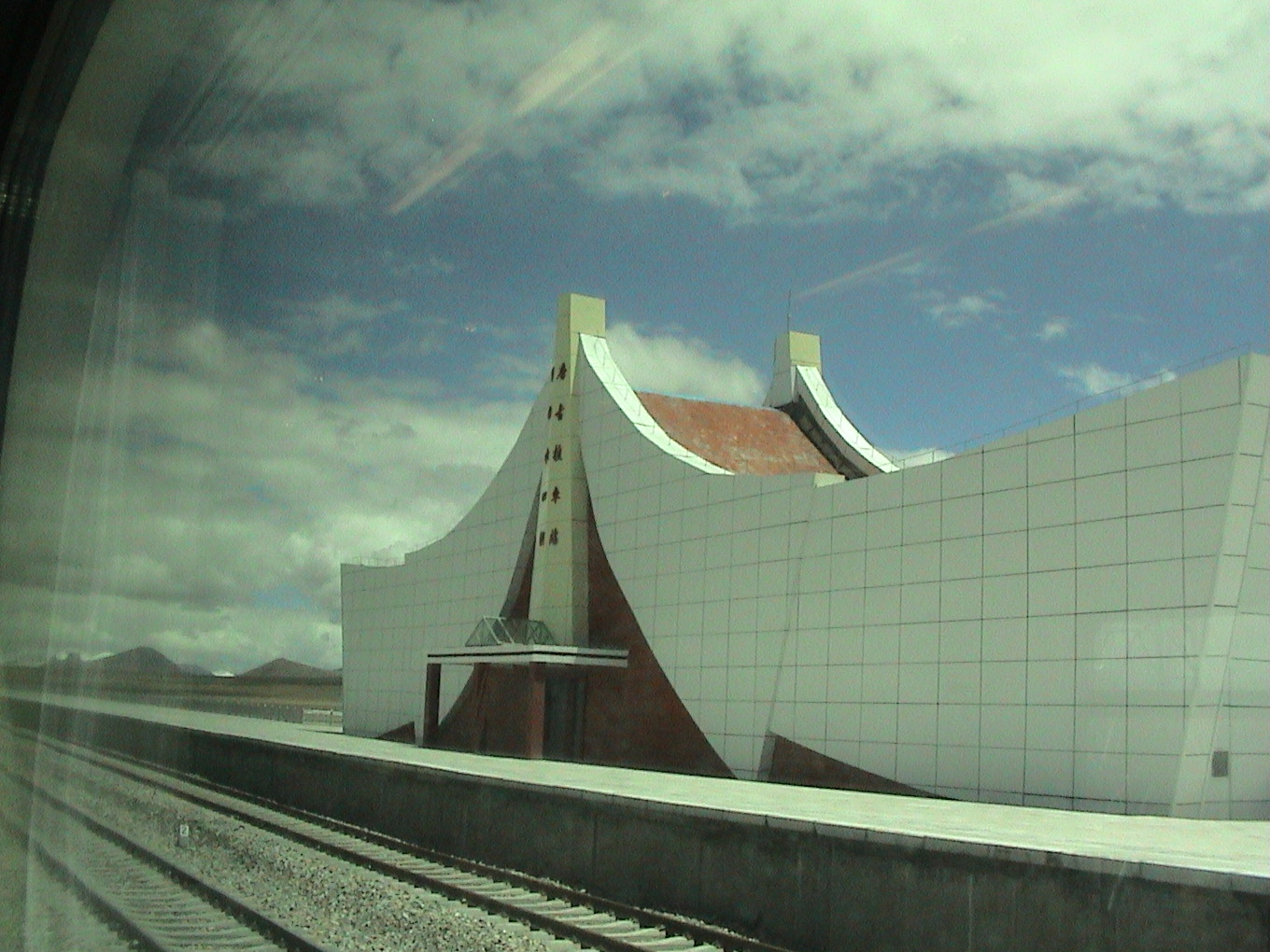
Tanggula railway station
5,068 meters above sea level

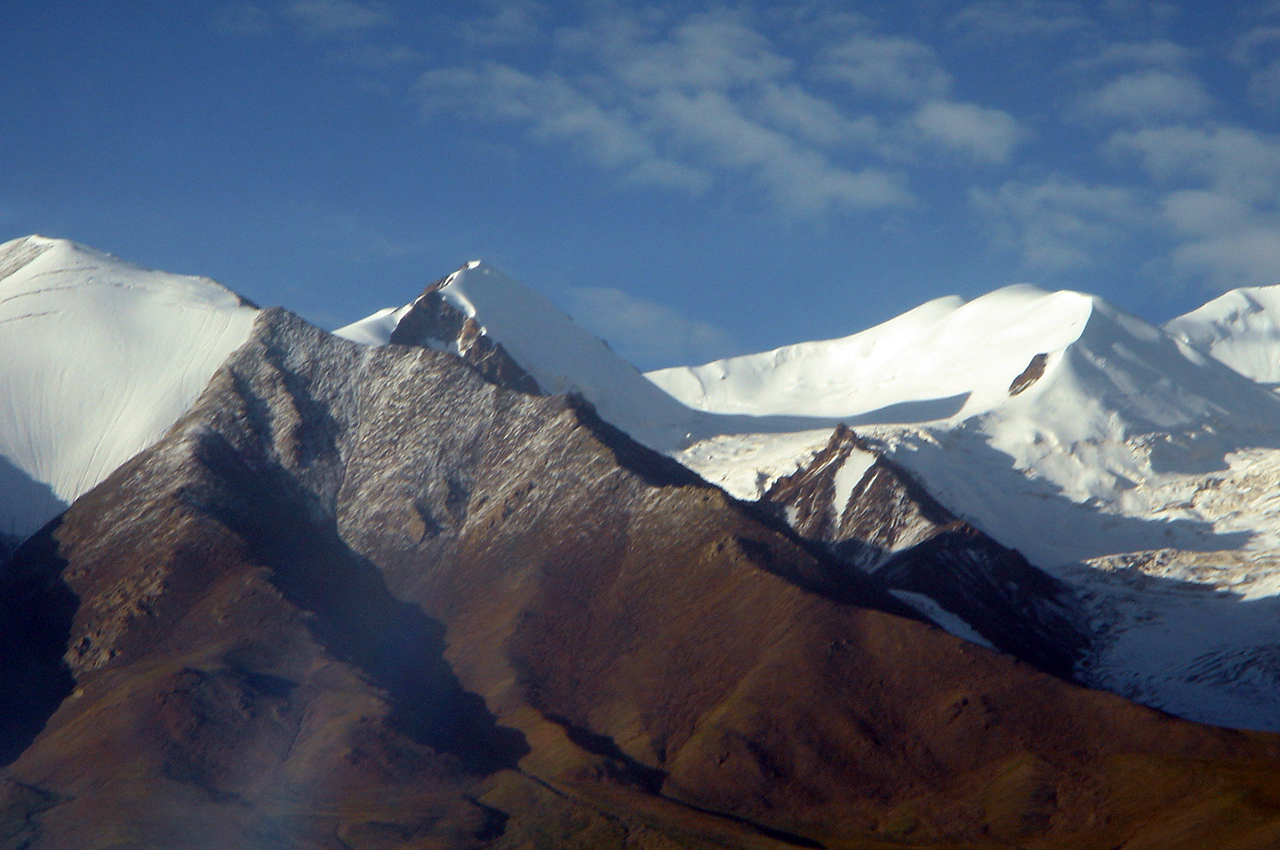
Tanggula Mountains

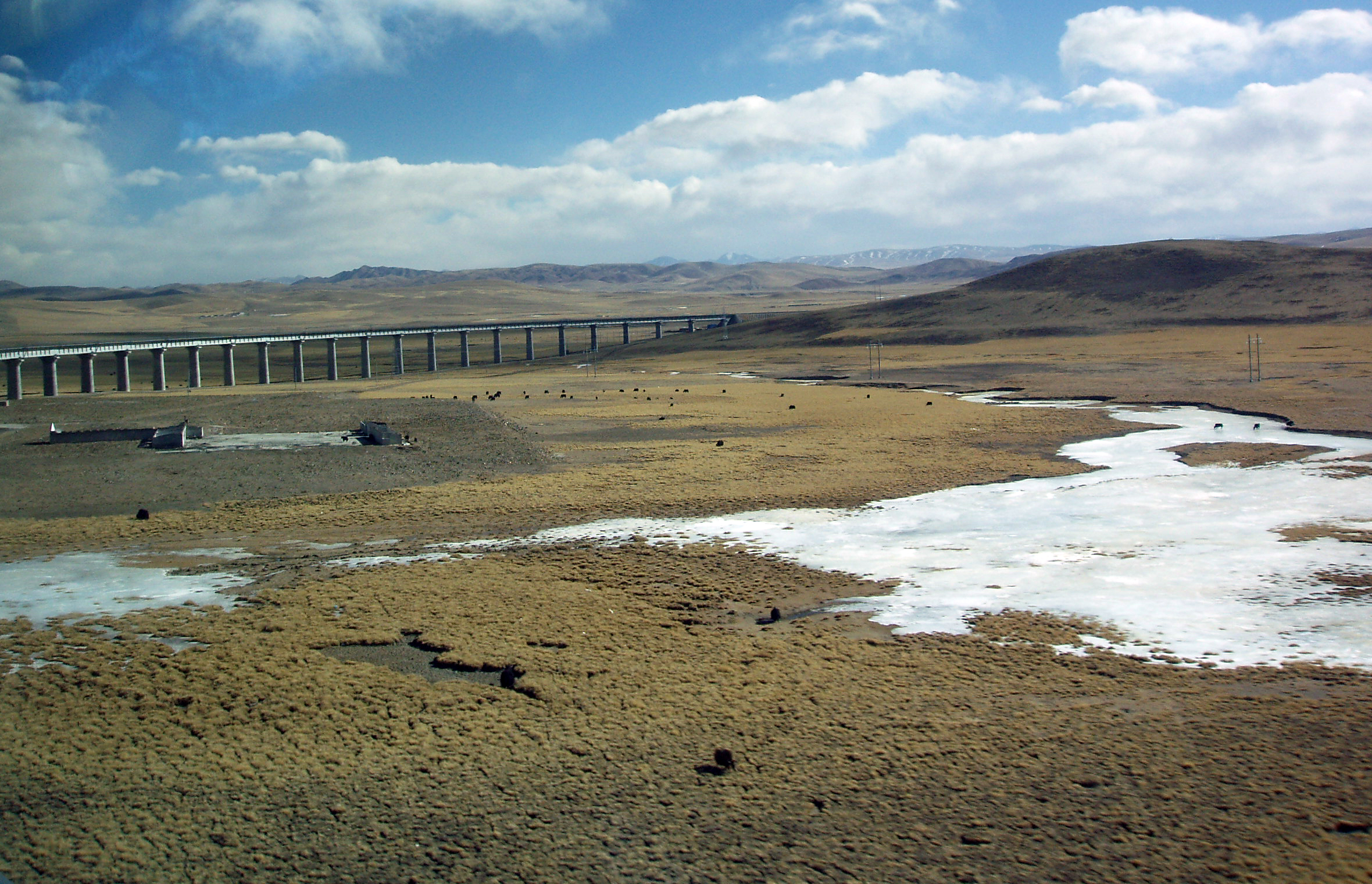
Bridge on permafrost horizon

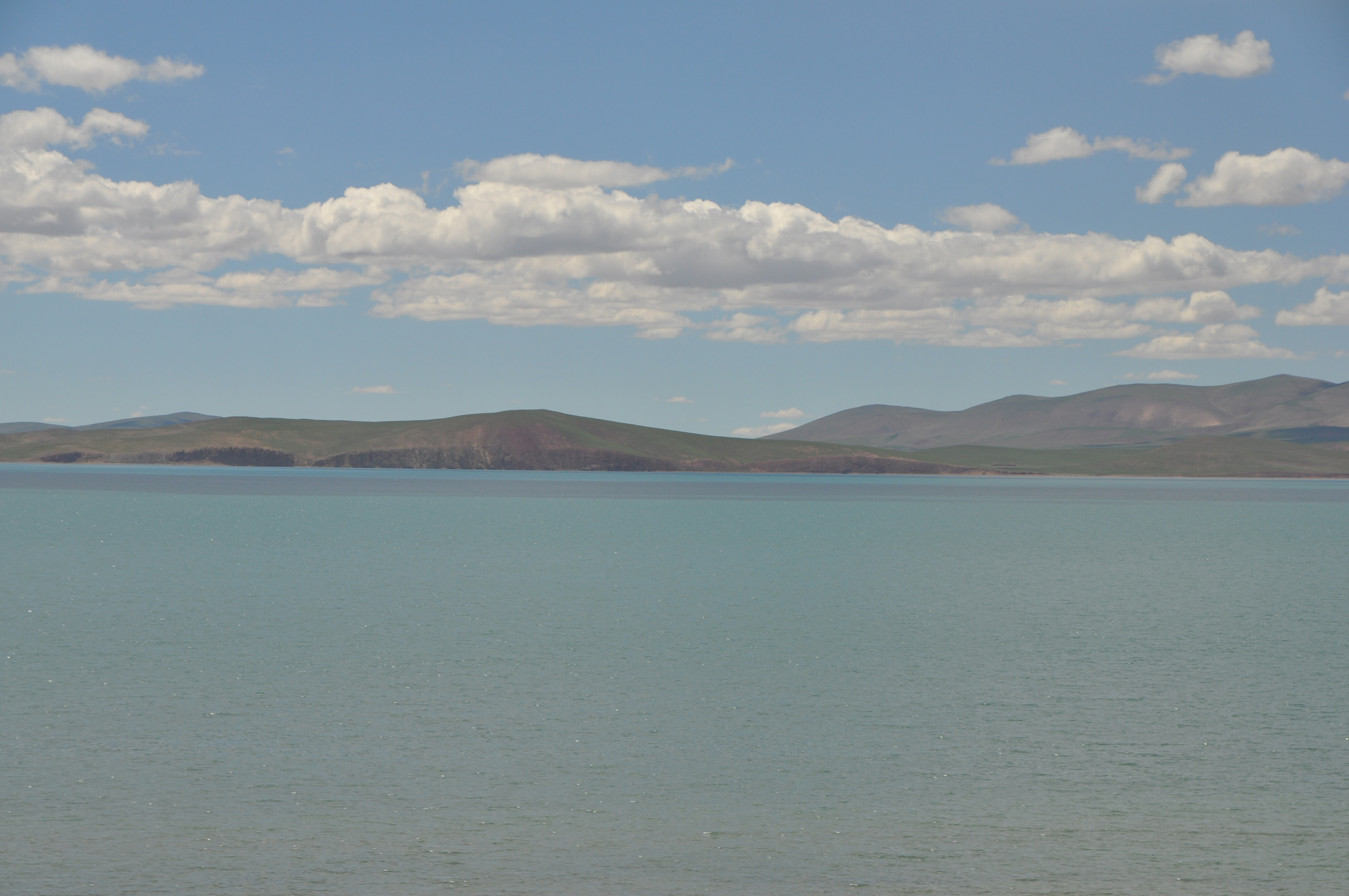
Tsonag Lake

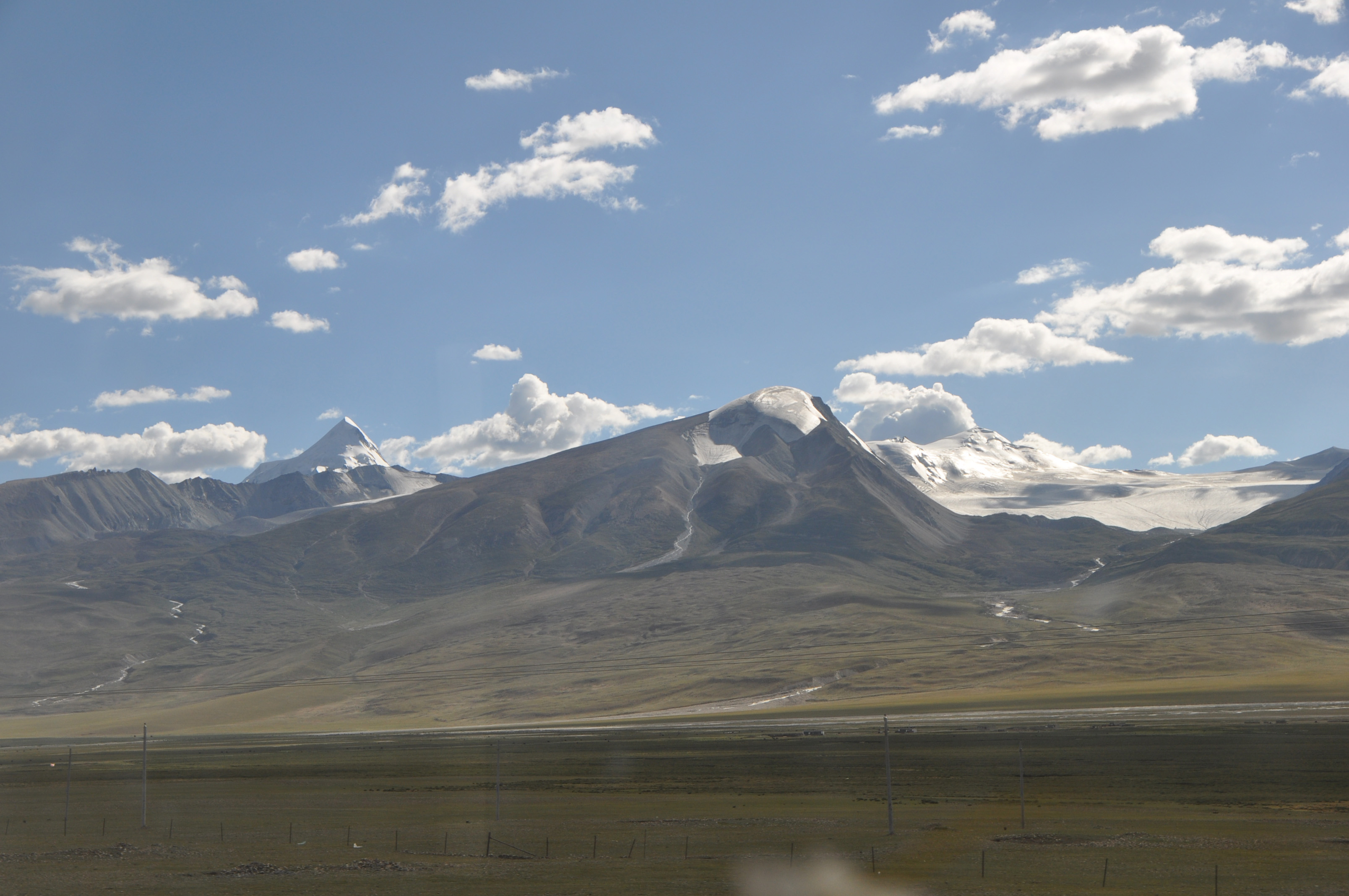
Nyenchen Tanglha Mountains

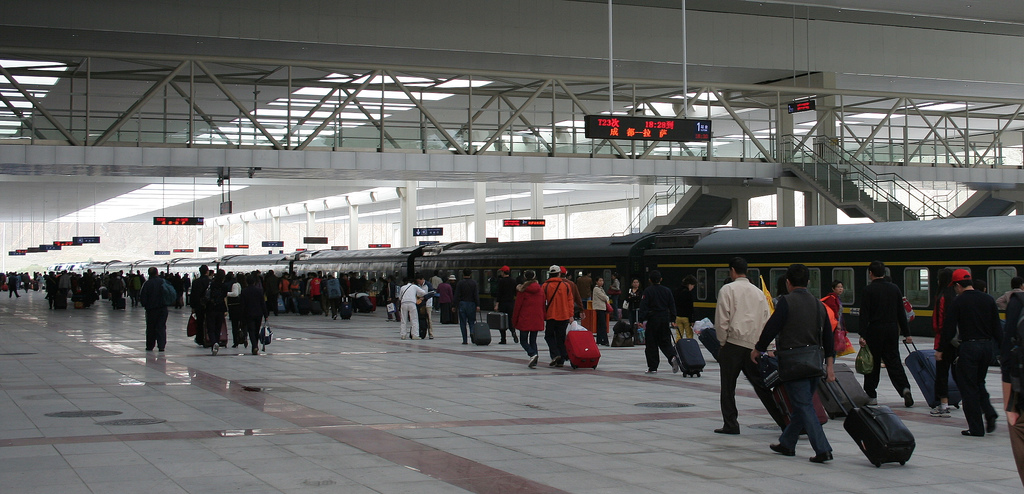
Lhasa railway station

== See also ==
- List of highest railways
- Sichuan–Tibet railway
- Rail transport in Tibet
