= Golmud railway station =

Railway station in Golmud, China

Coordinates: 36°22′58″N 94°54′21″E

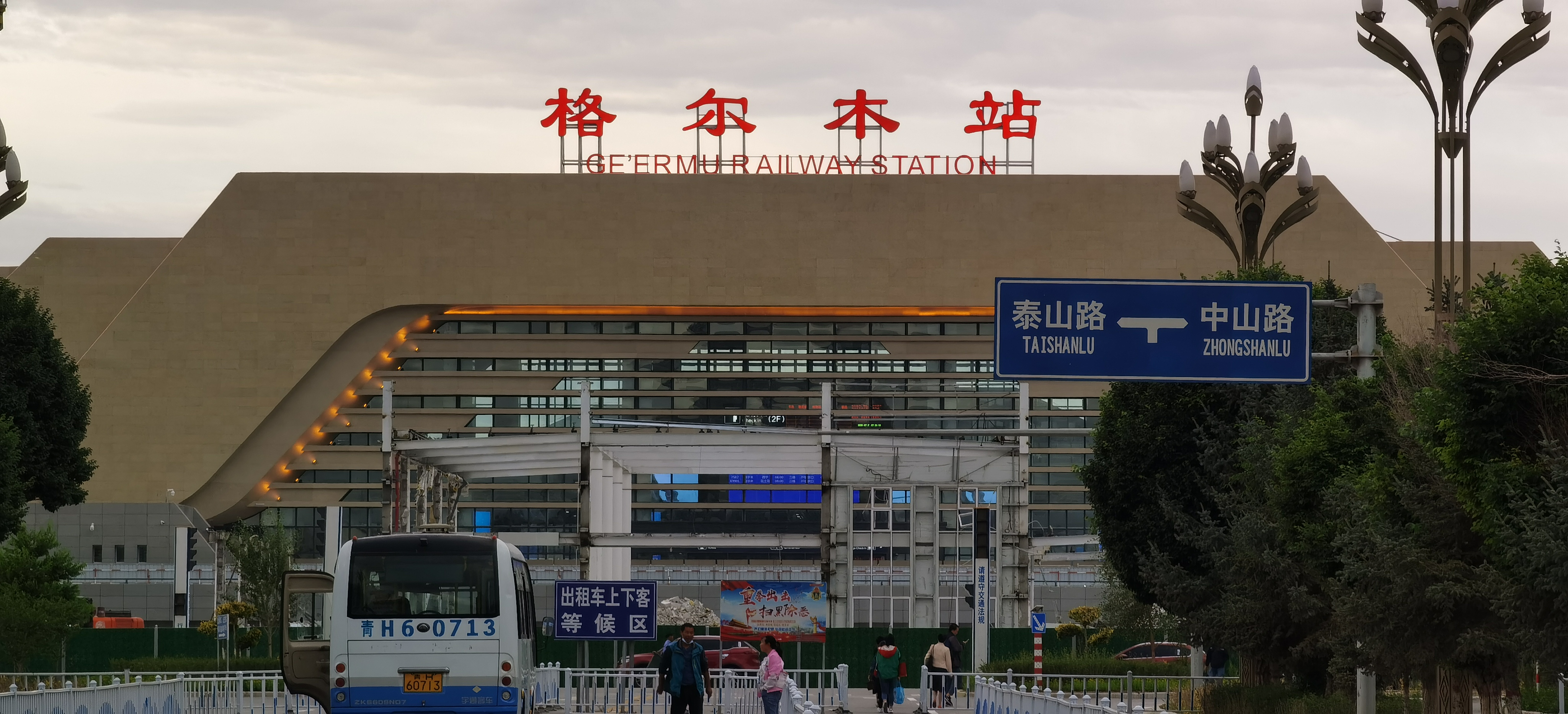
Golmud railway station

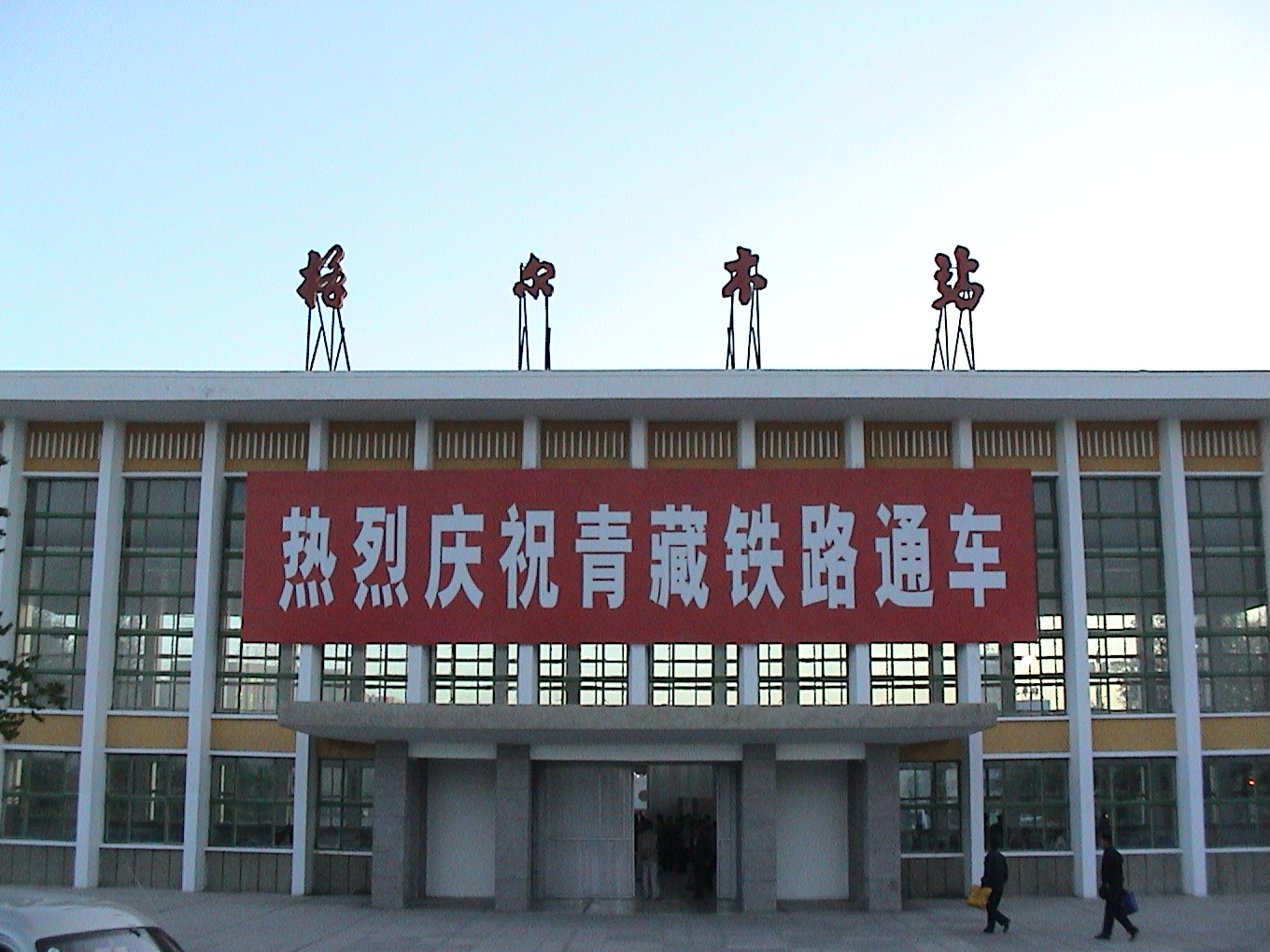
The station as seen from the platform (2006)

Golmud railway station, Geermu railway station or Ge'ermu railway station (simplified Chinese: 格尔木站; traditional Chinese: 格爾木站; pinyin: Gé'ěrmù Zhàn) is the main railway station of Golmud in Qinghai (China). The station is located at 2829 m above sea level and opened in 1979.

This is an intermediate station on the Qinghai–Tibet railway and the eastern terminus of the Golmud–Korla railway.

== History ==
Golmud railway station was rebuilt and expanded as part of the Golmud–Korla railway project. The new station was opened on 30 June 2020.

Preceding station	China Railway	Following station
Golmud East towards Xining	Qinghai–Tibet railway	Nanshankou towards Lhasa
