= Cuoma Township =

Cuoma
- Township
- Location within Tibet
- Coordinates: 32°7′42″N 91°28′37″E
- Country: China
- Region: Tibet
- Prefecture: Nagqu Prefecture
- County: Amdo County

Area
  - Total: 5,098 km^{2} (1,968 sq mi)

Population (2004)
  - Total: 3,100
  - Major Nationalities: Tibetan
  - Regional dialect: Tibetan language
- Time zone: +8

Cuoma, or Cuomaxiang (Chinese: 措玛乡) is a village and township-level division of Amdo County in the Nagqu Prefecture of the Tibet Autonomous Region, in China. It is located roughly 30 kilometres (19 mi) southwest of Amdo Town near the northern bank of Cona Lake. It covers an area of 5,098 square kilometres (1,968 sq mi) and as of 2004 had a population of about 3,100. Cuoma township of Amdo County has existed since 1960 and was further expanded in 1987, but Cuoma has also been listed under the jurisdiction of Seqing Township of Nyainrong County. The principal economic activity is animal husbandry, pastoral yak, goat, sheep, and so on.

== See also ==
- List of towns and villages in Tibet
