= Dongqiao, Tibet =

Dongqiao
- Village
- Location within Tibet
- Coordinates: 31°50′56.2″N 90°35′6.3″E
- Country: People's Republic of China
- Region: Tibet
- Prefecture: Nagqu Prefecture
- County: Amdo County

Population
  - Major Nationalities: Tibetan
  - Regional dialect: Tibetan language
- Time zone: +8

Dongqiao (Chinese: 东巧) is a village in Amdo County of Nagqu Prefecture, Tibet Autonomous Region, People's Republic of China. The village of Dongqiao is noted for its hot spring, Jipu. Dongqiao geologically gives its name to the wider Dongqiao-Nagqu Subregion and the Banggong-Dongqiao-Nujiang fault zone.

== Geography and geology ==
Dongqiao is located about 90 kilometres (56 mi) west of Amdo Town. It is located several kilometres to the south of Qiangma and Zigetangcuo Lake, to the northeast of Dongqiacuo lake at an altitude of about 4,657 metres (15,279 ft). The Nu River, also known as the Nujiang River flows nearby forming a valley and the Nutiang River also flows nearby. A small valley is located 7 kilometres (4.3 mi) southeast of Dongqiao. Dongqiao village gives its name to a large region which it is located in which is known geologically for its ophiolite, termed the "Dongqiao ophiolite belt", which is dated to the late Jurassic to early Cretaceous age. The Jurassic age formations form three distinct geological regions to the north of Lhasa, from north to south the Dongqiao-Nagqu Subregion, the Doilungdeqen-Lhunzhub Subregion and the Sangri Subregion. The northern boundary is known as the Banggong-Dongqiao-Nujiang fault zone or Bangongcuo-Dingqing fault zone, which divides it from the Qiangtang Terrane to the north beyond this. Towards the end of the Jurassic period, the ophiolite became covered by chromitite. As Guangcen Li puts it in a 1990 paper, "the ophiolites appear to be covered in turn by a transgressive marine detrital Upper Jurassic to lower most Cretaceous series."

The Chinese Academy of Geological Sciences has conducted studies in the area, identifying "diamond orebodies of diamondiferous ultrabasic rock type in Dongqiao and Lhobsa of Amdo County, northern Tibet." The village of Dongqiao is noted for its hot spring, Jipu.

== Economy ==
Due to its geological background, Dongqiao is also a known mining spot, containing the Dongfeng Chrome Mine.
