= Zharen =

- Town
- Location within Tibet
- Coordinates: 31°49′04″N 91°44′01″E
- Country: China
- Region: Tibet
- Prefecture: Nagqu Prefecture
- County: Amdo County

Population
  - Total: 7,875
  - Major Nationalities: Tibetan
  - Regional dialect: Tibetan language
- Time zone: +8

Zharen, also Zaring or Zharencun (Chinese: 扎仁镇) is a small town and township-level division of Amdo County in the Nagqu Prefecture of the Tibet Autonomous Region, in China. It is located at the side of the G109 road, 41.9 kilometres (26.0 mi) south of Amdo Town on the road from Nagchu Town, and approximately 20 kilometres (12 mi) east of the southern tip of Cona Lake. It has a population of 7875, living in 1479 households.

== History ==
Zharen township was established in 1962, and in 2002 it received Town status. It has jurisdiction over 12 village committees, with 219 natural villages.

== Administrative divisions ==
The township-level division contains nine village committees and one neighborhood which are as follows:

- Nase Neighborhood (纳色居委会)
- Mailong Village (麦龙村)
- Zaisong Village (再松村)
- Lamucuo Village (拉姆措村)
- Guojia Village (果加村)
- Cuogou Luoma Village (措沟洛玛村)
- Reta Village (热塔村)
- Nimalong Village (尼玛龙村)
- Cagao Gongma Village (擦高工玛村)
- Ouchi Village (欧赤村)

== Economy ==
The economy is mainly based on animal husbandry, with locals raising yak, sheep and goats. There are primary schools and health centres.

== See also ==
- List of towns and villages in Tibet
