= Cuonahu railway station =

Railway station in Tibet, China

Coordinates: 32°02′04″N 91°32′04″E

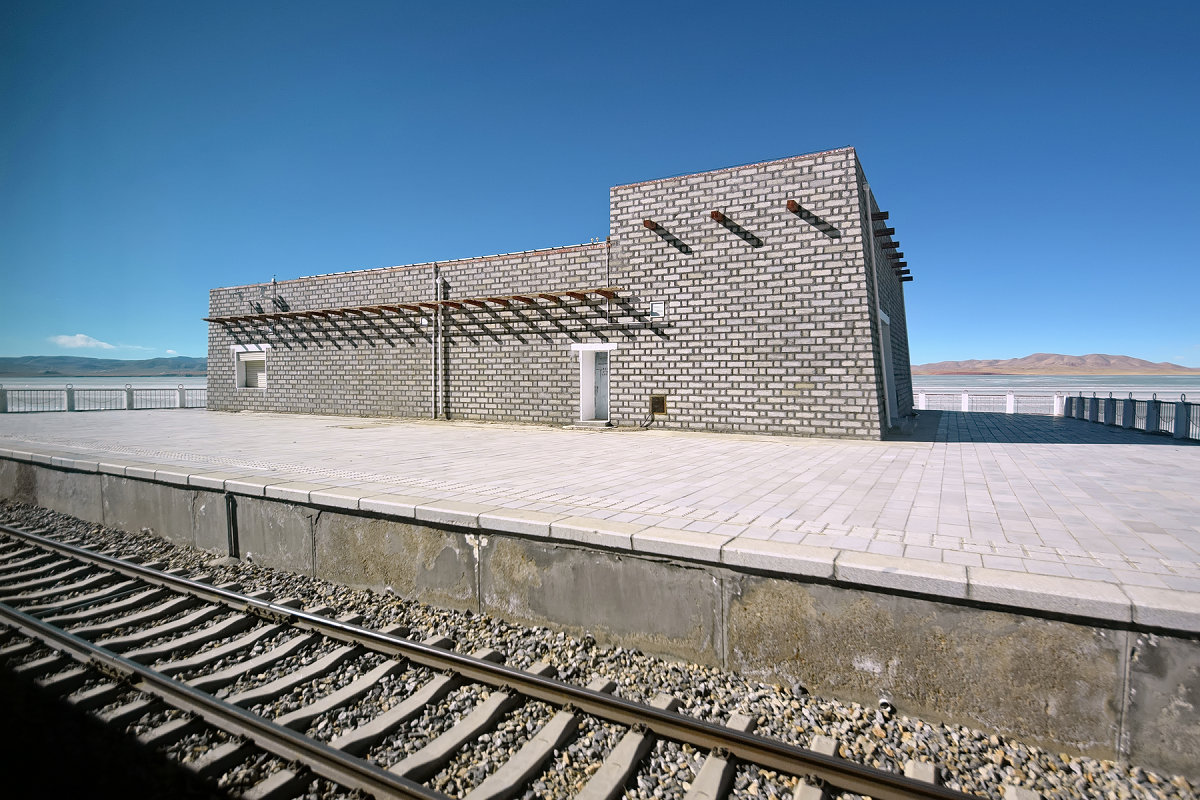
Cuonahu railway station

Cuonahu railway station (Chinese: 错那湖站; pinyin: Cuònàhú zhàn; lit. 'Tsonag Lake railway station') is a station on the Chinese Qinghai–Tibet Railway. The station is located in Amdo County, Nagchu, Tibet Autonomous Region. Cuonahu railway station is located on the eastern shores of Tsonag Lake (Chinese: 错那湖).

On August 29, 2006, a T223 passenger train derailed near the station causing significant delays.

== See also ==
- Qinghai–Tibet Railway
- List of stations on Qinghai–Tibet railway
- Tsonag Lake

Preceding station	China Railway	Following station
Amdo towards Xining	Qinghai–Tibet railway	Liantonghe towards Lhasa
