= Amdo railway station =

Railway station in Tibet, China

Coordinates: 32°15′8″N 91°39′57″E

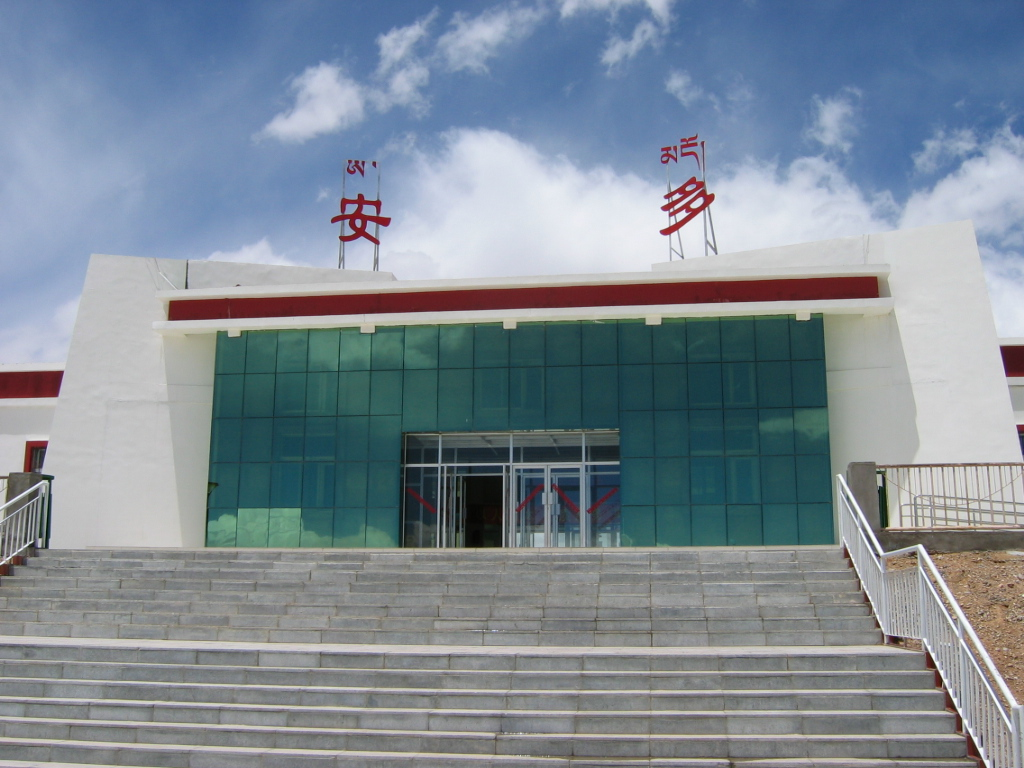
Amdo railway station

Amdo railway station (Chinese: 安多站) is the Qinghai–Tibet Railway station in Amdo County, Nagchu, Tibet, China. The station is located 1,524 km (947 mi) from Xining Railway Station.

With an elevation of 4,702 m, Amdo station is one of the highest altitude railway station in the world. Serving the township of Pana, seat of Amdo County, the station is also one of the highest railway station with a regular passenger service schedule: two passenger services are available at this station each day.

== Station layout ==
The station has a crossing loop and several goods sidings adjacent to the passenger station.

== See also ==
- Amdo
- List of stations on Qinghai–Tibet railway
- List of highest railways in the world

Preceding station	China Railway	Following station
Tuoju towards Xining	Qinghai–Tibet railway	Cuonahu towards Lhasa
