= Qiangma =

- Town
- Location within Tibet
- Coordinates: 31°58′35″N 90°50′40″E
- Country: China
- Region: Tibet
- Prefecture: Nagqu Prefecture
- County: Amdo County

Area
  - Total: 5,467 km^{2} (2,111 sq mi)

Population (2004)
  - Total: 1,700
  - Major Nationalities: Tibetan
  - Regional dialect: Tibetan language
- Time zone: +8

Qiangma, also Qangma or Qiangmazhen (Chinese: 强玛镇) is a small town and township-level division of Amdo County in the Nagqu Prefecture of the Tibet Autonomous Region, in China. It is located just south of Zi Getangcuo Lake, 90.7 kilometres (56.4 mi) southwest of Amdo Town. It covers an area of 5,467 square kilometres (2,111 sq mi) and as of 2004 it had a population of about 1700. The principal economic activity is animal husbandry, pastoral yak, goat, sheep, and so on.

== Administrative divisions ==
The township-level division contains six village committees which are as follows:

- Qiangma Neighborhood (强玛居委会)
- Jizha Buka Village (吉扎布卡村)
- Reka Village (热卡村)
- Liangxin Village (酿心村)
- Jiaomao Village (觉毛村)
- Bage Village (巴格村)

== See also ==
- List of towns and villages in Tibet
