= Jiaqiong Town =

Jiaqiong Jongnag
- Town

Tibetan transcription(s)
  - Tibetan: བྱ་ཁྱུང

Chinese transcription(s)
  - Traditional: 佳琼镇
  - Pinyin: Jiaqiong-zhen
- Location within Tibet
- Coordinates: 31°39′32″N 90°34′40″E
- Country: China
- Region: Tibet
- Prefecture: Nagqu
- County: Baingoin

Area
  - Total: 2,993 km^{2} (1,156 sq mi)
- Elevation: 4,797 m (15,738 ft)

Population (2010)
  - Total: 2,926
  - Major Nationalities: Tibetan
  - Regional dialect: Tibetan language
- Time zone: +8

Jiaqiong or Jakhyung Town, also known as Jongnag (Jakhyung བྱ་ཁྱུང་, Jiaqiong-zhen 佳琼镇) is a small town and township-level division in Baingoin County, Nagqu in the Tibet Autonomous Region of the People's Republic of China. It covers an area of 2,993 square kilometres (1,156 sq mi) and as of 2010 it had a population of 2926 people. Jiaqiong lies to the northwest of Beila, to the east of Amdo County, and south of Shuanghu County.

== History ==
The township was established in 1960. In 1987 the original Jiaqiong, Qiongna Group and Baisong Townships were merged into Jiaqiong. In 2002 it merged with Kangri Township.

== Geography and geology ==
The township-level division lies in the southeast of the Nagqu region. It covers an area of 2,993 square kilometres (1,156 sq mi), accounting for 9.9% of the area of Baingoin County in its northeast. Jiaqiong lies 70 kilometres (43 mi) northeast of Baingoin the northwest of Beila and west of Maqian, and to the east of Amdo County, and south of Shuanghu County.

The town itself is situated between Dongqia Co and Daru Co lakes, to the west of the Sangqu River. The town has jurisdiction over the neighborhood of Dolcha Community (多尔查居委会) and the village committees of Duodi or Duocha (多地村), Yangmubu (央木布村), Nagacha (那高查村), Rekanuma (热卡努玛村) and Hikawa Xiema (热卡下玛村). Rekanuma lies on the northwestern shore of Daru lake, while the villages of Jiangpu and Ma'er Suiququ lie on the northern end. Duocha lies upriver to the northeast of Jiaqiong Town, and Kangma village lies further north of that. The area to the northeast of Kangma, between there and the northern end of Daru lake is more mountainous, rising to an elevation of over 5,400 metres (17,700 ft). Morong is a river village between Duocha and Daru Lake.

The Jongnag fault in the area cuts northwards through the Bangong Lake-Nujiang River fault and is described as a "S-N discontinuously rising magnetic anomaly zone".

== Demographics ==
As of 2010 the township had a population of 2926 of which 1530 were women and 1396 men. Children under 15 years made up 32%, adults 15–64 years 62%, and older people over 65 years 4.0%.

== Economy ==
The economy is mainly based on animal husbandry. There is an area of 210,000 hectares of grassland. The principal livestock products include meat, dairy products, fur and cashmere. In 2003, the total income of the rural economy in Jiaqiong was 700.13 million yuan, and the per capita annual income of herders was 1,329.94 yuan.
