= Gangnyi =

- Township
- Location within Tibet
- Coordinates: 32°49′21″N 91°25′35″E
- Country: China
- Region: Tibet
- Prefecture: Nagqu Prefecture
- County: Amdo County

Area
  - Total: 5,019 km^{2} (1,938 sq mi)

Population (2004)
  - Total: 1,300
  - Major Nationalities: Tibetan
  - Regional dialect: Tibetan language
- Time zone: +8

Gangnyi, Gangni, Gangnyixiang or Gangnixiang (Chinese: 岗尼乡) is a village and township-level division of Amdo County in the Nagqu Prefecture of the Tibet Autonomous Region, in China. It is located roughly 60 kilometres (37 mi) northwest of Amdo Town. The township covers an area of 5,019 kilometres (3,119 mi) and as of 2004 it had a population of around 1,300. The principal economic activity is animal husbandry, pastoral yak, goat, sheep, and so on.

== Administrative divisions ==
The township-level division contains the following villages:

- Longmu Village (隆木村)
- Dangguo Gangni Village (当果岗尼村)
- Nima Longmu Village 尼玛隆木村
- Nanacha Village (纳那查村)
- Domar Miri Gongou Village (多玛米日贡欧村)
- Duozhuo Jiajiang Village (多卓加江村)

== See also ==
- List of towns and villages in Tibet
