= Za'gyazangbo railway station =

Railway station in Amdo County, China

Coordinates: 32.7034°N 91.5066°E

Za'gya Zangbo railway station is a station on the Chinese Qinghai–Tibet Railway, at an altitude of 4,886 metres (16,030 ft).

== See also ==
- List of highest railway stations in the world
- Qingzang Railway
- List of stations on Qingzang railway

| Preceding station | China Railway | Following station |
|---|---|---|
| Tanggula South towards Xining | Qinghai–Tibet railway | Tuoju towards Lhasa |
