= Diwuma railway station =

Railway station in Tibet, China

Coordinates: 30°32′31.762″N 91°22′38.680″E

250px

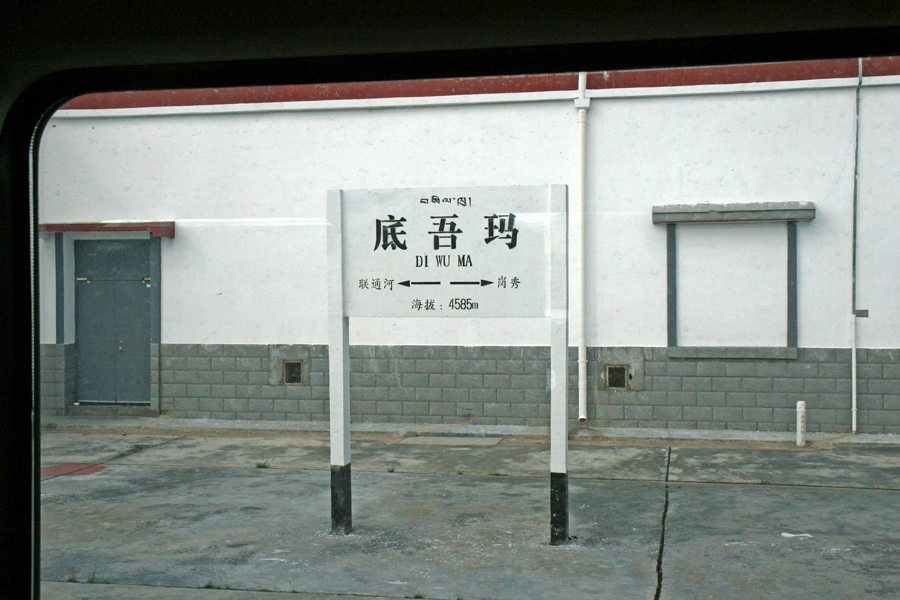
Di Wu Ma, Railway station

Diwuma railway station (Chinese: 底吾玛站) is a station on the Chinese Qingzang Railway.

== See also ==
- Qingzang Railway
- List of stations on Qingzang railway

Preceding station	China Railway	Following station
Liantonghe towards Xining	Qinghai–Tibet railway	Gangxiu towards Lhasa
