= Yanshiping =

Yanshiping 雁石坪镇
- Town
- Location within Qinghai Yanshiping (Tibet)
- Coordinates: 33°35′50″N 92°04′10″E
- Country: People's Republic of China
- Autonomous region: Tibet
- Prefecture: Nagqu Prefecture
- County: Amdo County
- Elevation: 4,720 m (15,490 ft)

Population (2017)
  - Total: 2,919
  - Major Nationalities: Tibetan
- Time zone: +8

Yanshiping (Chinese: 雁石坪镇; pinyin: Yànshípíng zhèn) is a small town physically situated in the southwest of Qinghai province, China. However, it is under the jurisdiction of Amdo County in the Nagqu Prefecture of the Tibet Autonomous Region. At an elevation of 4,720 metres (15,490 ft), it is one of the highest permanent settlements in the world.

The town is situated on the Qinghai-Tibet Highway. The principal industries include transport, animal husbandry and tourism.

== Administrative divisions ==
The township-level division contains seven village committees and one neighborhood which are as follows:

- Yanshiping Neighborhood (雁石坪居委会)
- Zhukouma Village (朱扣玛村)
- Naqianma Village (那前玛村)
- Bumadai Village (布玛代村)
- Menlie Sangma Village (门列桑玛村)
- Longyama Village (龙亚玛村)
- Oubudong Village (欧布东村)
- Buka Rida Village (布卡日达村)

== See also ==
- List of towns and villages in Tibet
