= Tuoju railway station =

Railway station in Tibet, China

Coordinates: 32.3987°N 91.6169°E

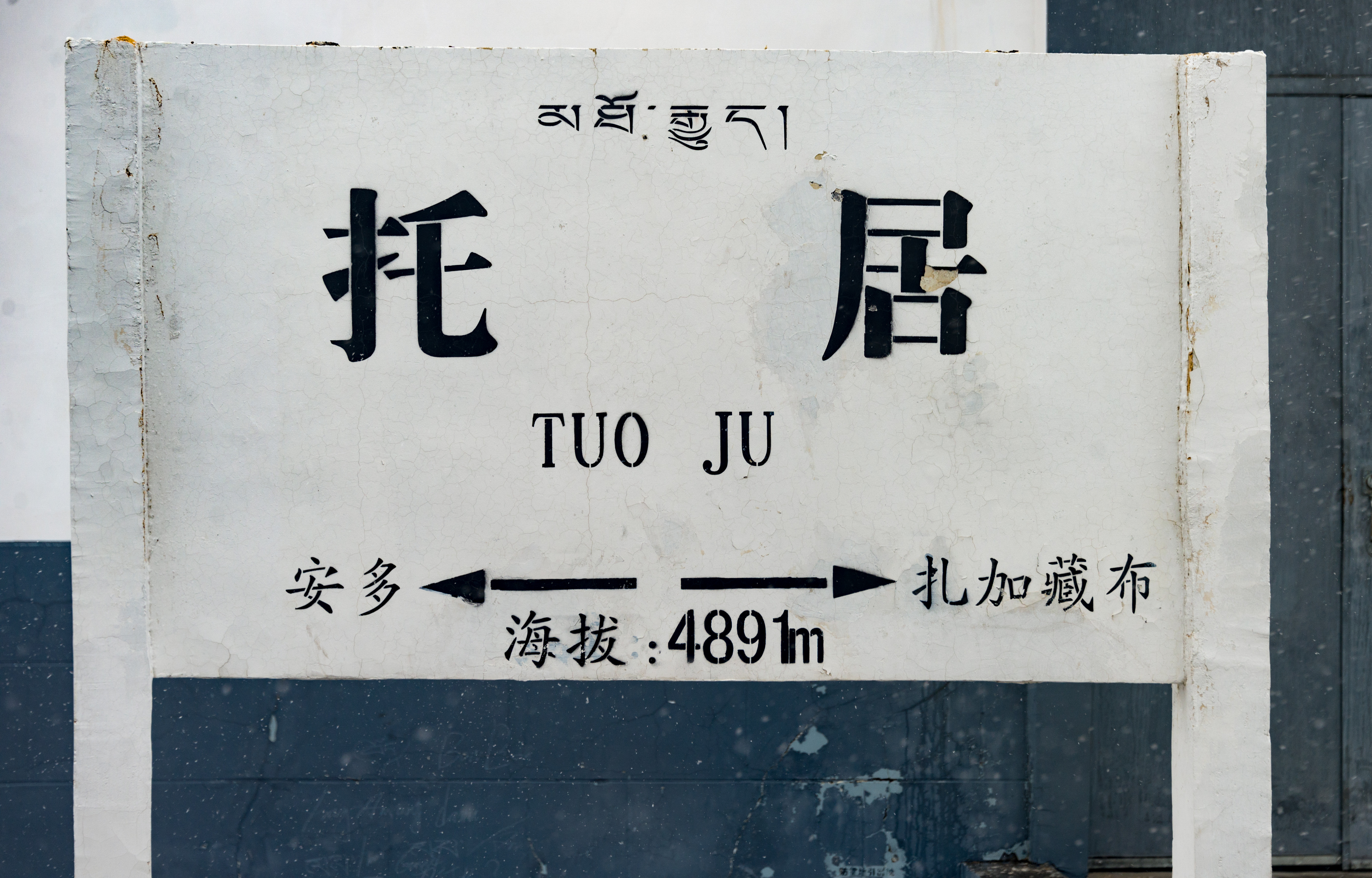
An image of Tuoju railway station

Tuoju railway station is a station on the Chinese Qingzang Railway.

== See also ==
- List of highest railway stations in the world
- Qingzang Railway
- List of stations on Qingzang railway

Preceding station	China Railway	Following station
Za'gyazangbo towards Xining	Qinghai–Tibet railway	Amdo towards Lhasa
