= Sewu, Tibet =

Sewu
- Township
- Location within Tibet
- Coordinates: 33.68°N 90.31°E
- Country: China
- Region: Tibet
- Prefecture: Nagqu Prefecture
- County: Amdo County

Area
  - Total: 5,647 km^{2} (2,180 sq mi)

Population (2004)
  - Total: 1,000
  - Major Nationalities: Tibetan
  - Regional dialect: Tibetan language
- Time zone: +8

Sewu, Sêwa or Sewuxiang (Chinese: 色务乡) is a village and township-level division of Amdo County in the Nagqu Prefecture of the Tibet Autonomous Region, in China. It lies near Qixiang Lake. The township covers an area of 5,647 kilometres (3,509 mi) and in 2004 it had a population of about 1,000. The principal economic activity is animal husbandry, pastoral yak, goat, sheep, and so on.

== Administrative divisions ==
The township-level division contains the following villages:

- Meijiegang Village (美接岗村)
- Sangguo Village (桑果村)
- Bamu Luozong Village (巴姆罗宗村)
- Mamao Xuna Village (玛毛许那村)

== See also ==
- List of towns and villages in Tibet
