= Liantonghe railway station =

Chinese railroad station on the Qingzang Railway

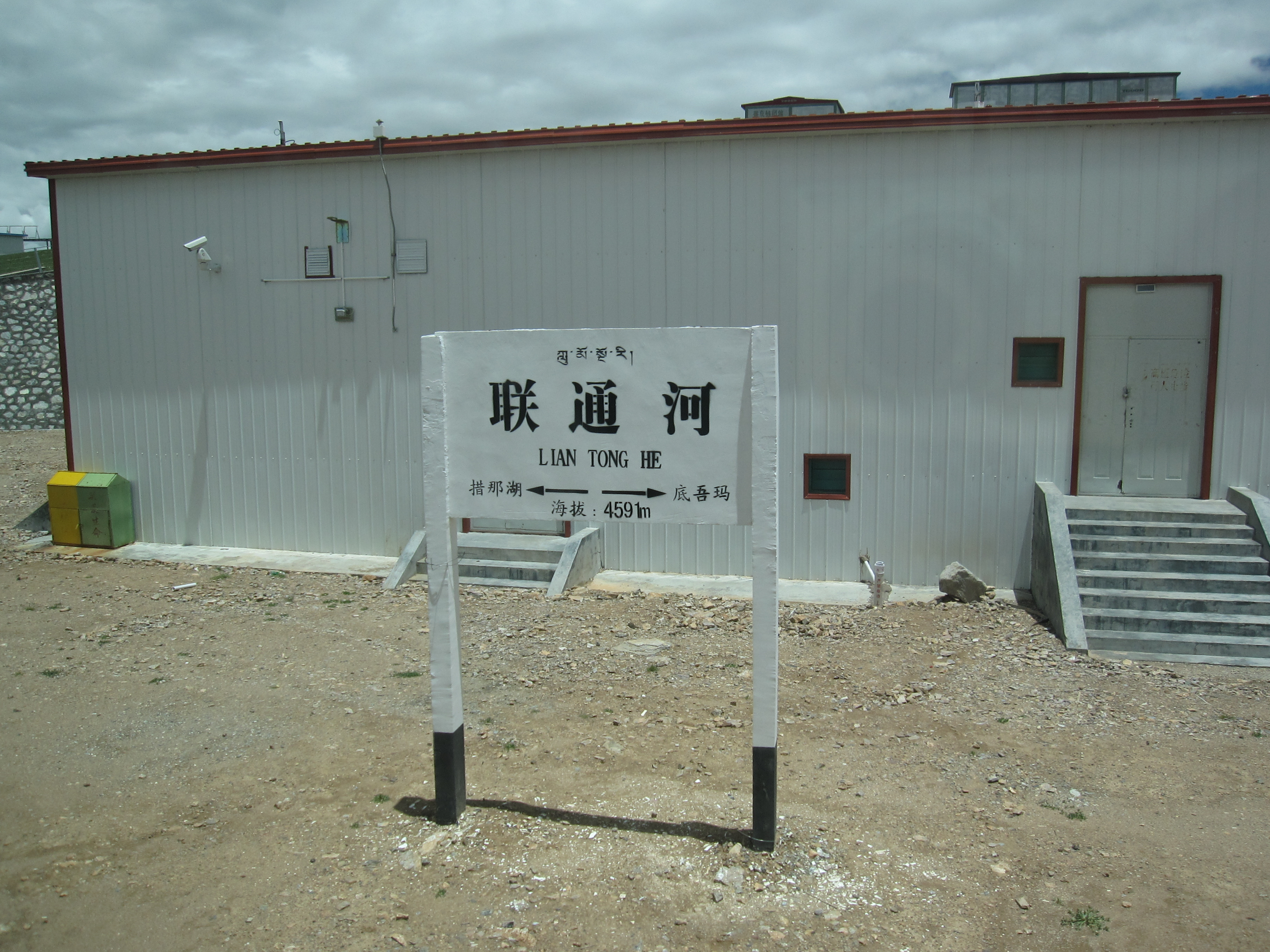
Liantonghe railway station

Liantonghe railway station (simplified Chinese: 联通河站; traditional Chinese: 聯通河站; pinyin: Liántōnghé Zhàn) is a station launched in 2006 on the Chinese Qingzang Railway.

== See also ==
- List of stations on Qingzang railway

Preceding station	China Railway	Following station
Cuonahu towards Xining	Qinghai–Tibet railway	Diwuma towards Lhasa
