= Yurla =

Yurla may refer to:

- Yurla (dish), a Tibetan wheat pastry dish
- Yurla (rural locality), a rural locality (a selo) in Yurlinsky District of Perm Krai, Russia
