= Cona Lake =

Cuona Lake
- Tsonag Lake
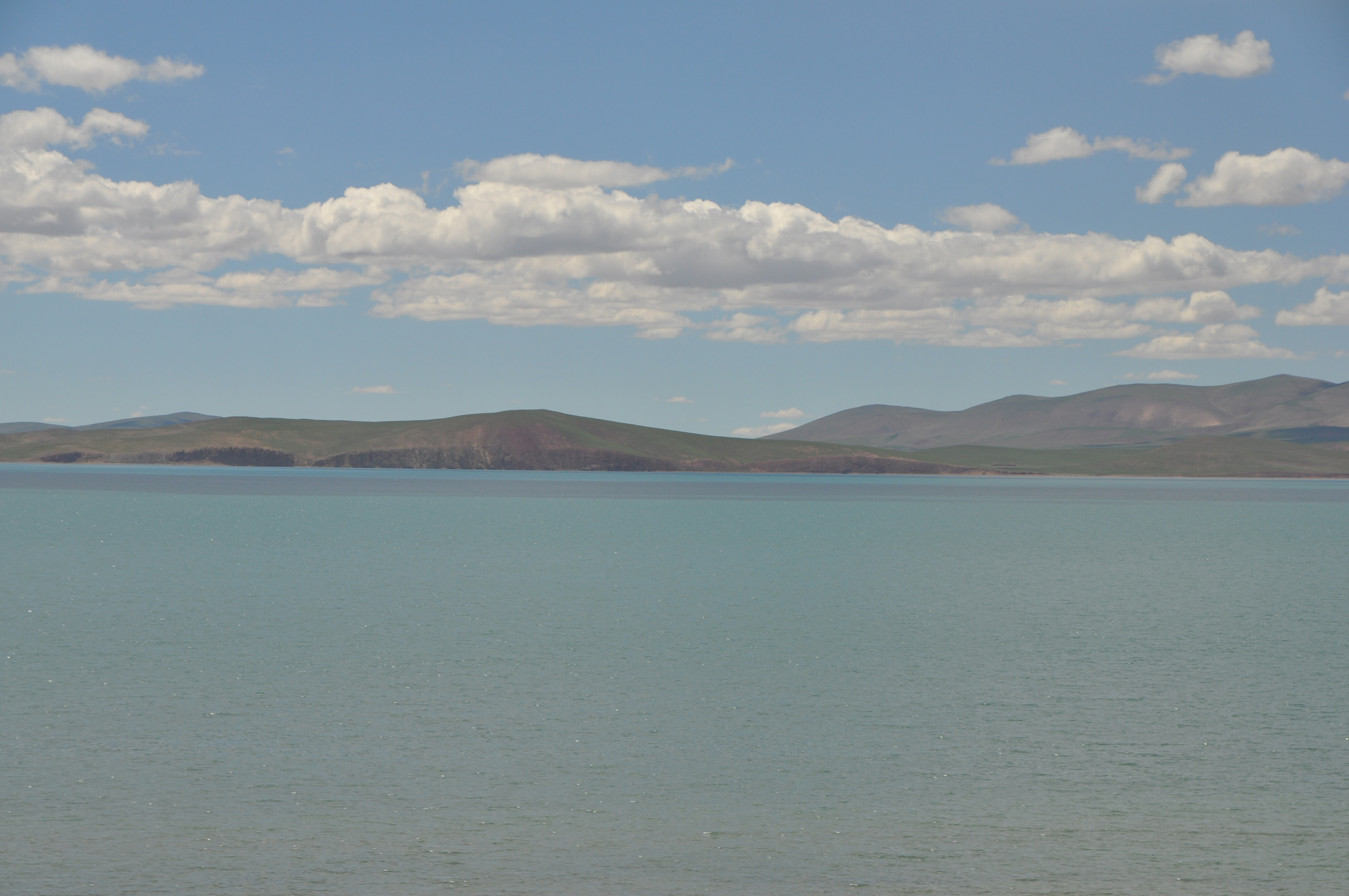
- Tsonag Lake, from the Qingzang Railway train window

- Location within Tibet
- Location: Amdo County, Nagqu, Tibet Autonomous Region
- Coordinates: 32°1′58″N 91°28′43″E
- Type: lake
- Surface area: 300 square kilometres (120 sq mi)
- Surface elevation: 4,594 metres (15,072 ft)

Cona, also Cuona Lake or Tsonag Lake (simplified Chinese: 错那湖; traditional Chinese: 錯那湖; pinyin: Cuònà Hú), is a major lake of northern Tibet Autonomous Region, China. It is located in Amdo County, Nagqu, west of the road between Nagqu Town and Pana Town. The lake is considered holy to the Tibetans especially in the Bon religion, as it is seen as the "soul lake" of the Razheng Living Buddha. The smaller Ganong Lake lies almost adjacent to the southeast.

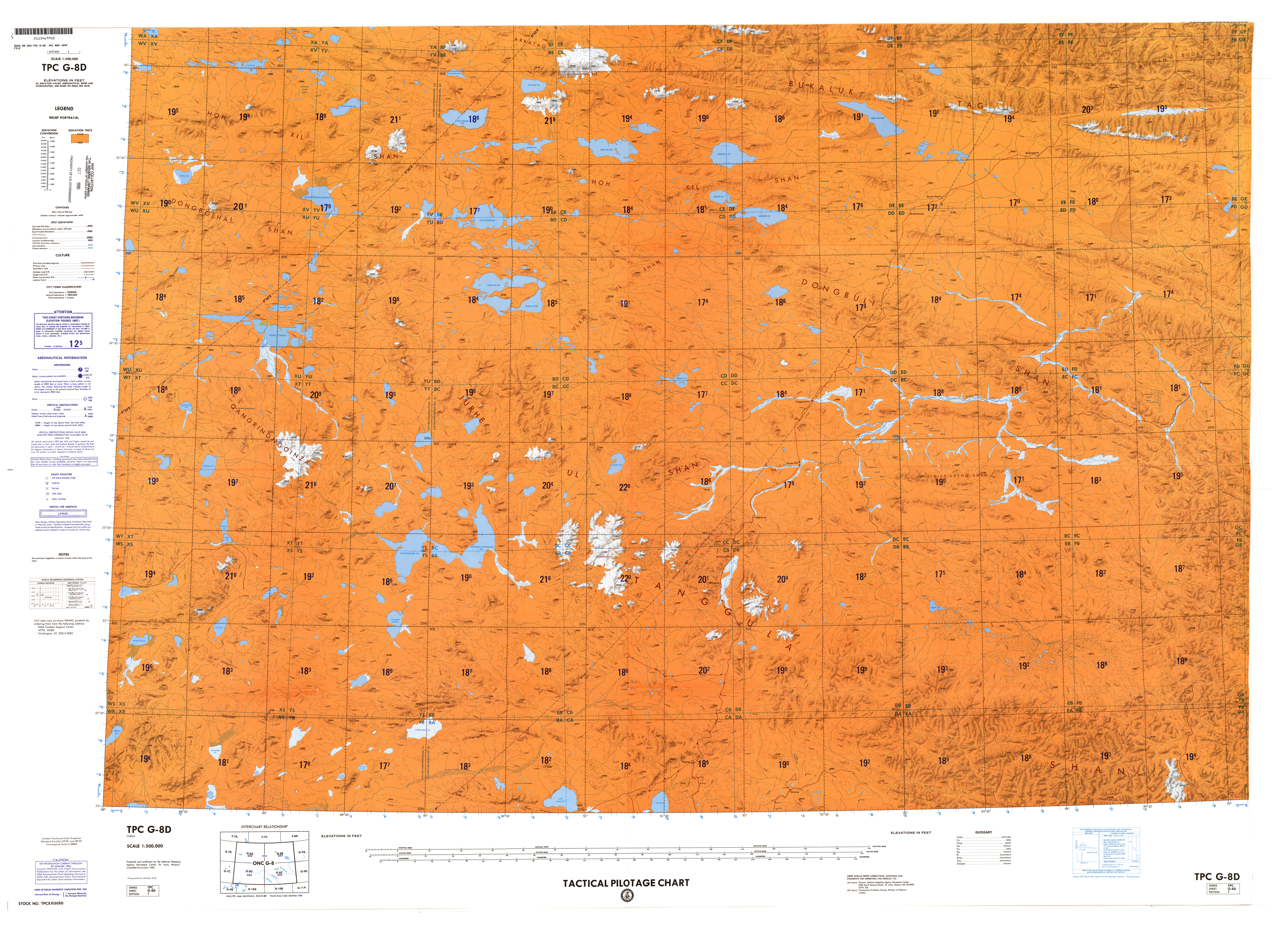
Map including Conag Lake

Its area is approximately 300 square kilometres (120 sq mi), and it is at 4,594 metres (15,072 ft) above sea level making it one of the world's higher freshwater lakes. The lake is the source of the Gyalmo Nagqu, the headwater of the Salween River.

Tsonag Lake can be observed on the right (west) as the train passes Cuonahu railway station on Qingzang Railway, going south toward Lhasa.

== See also ==
- Qingzang Railway
- Cuonahu railway station
