= Zigetangcuo Lake =

Lake in the North Tibetan Plateau

Tsige Dartso
- 兹格塘错 (Chinese); ཙི་གེ་དར་མཚོ (Standard Tibetan)
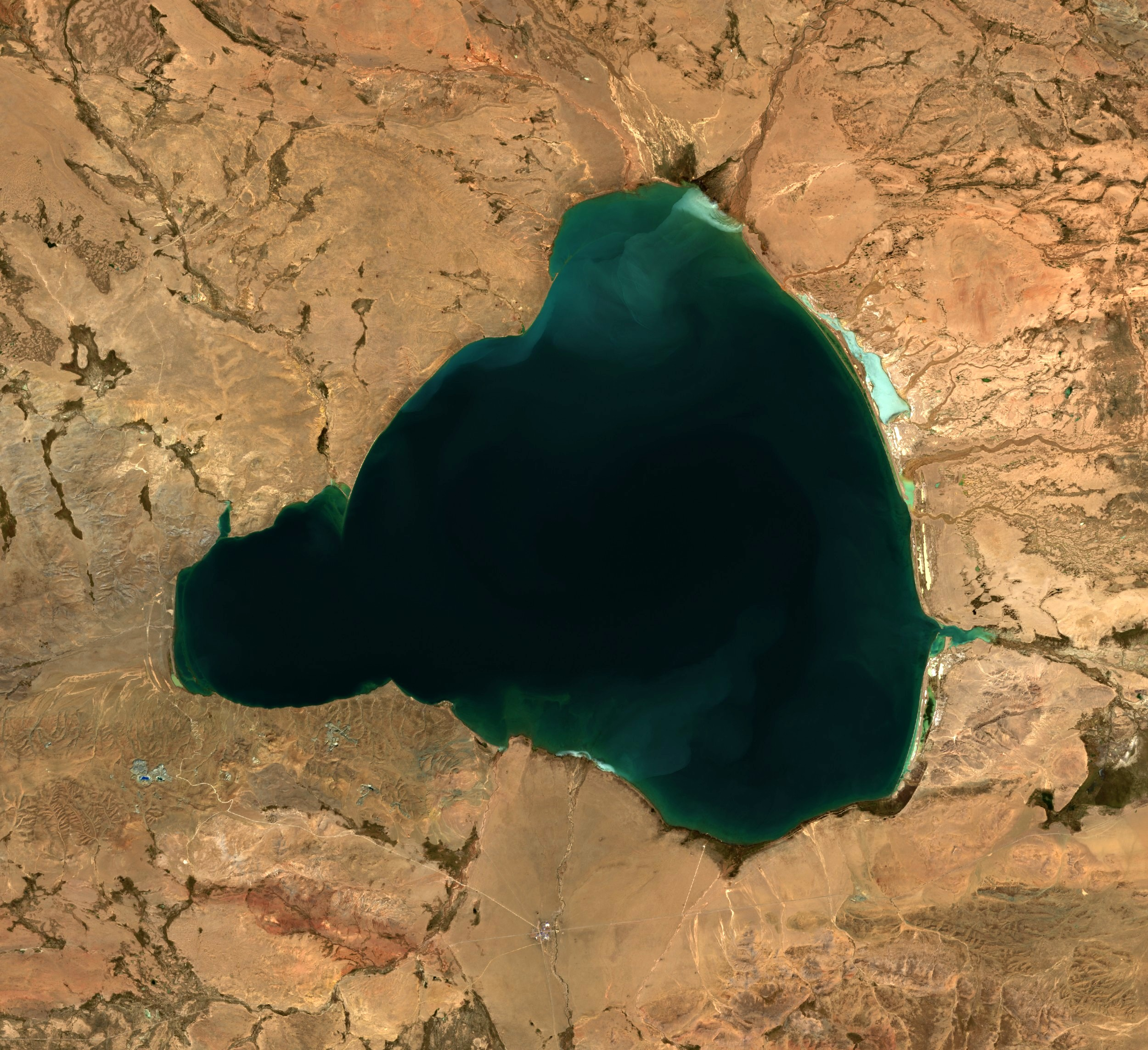
- Sentinel-2 image (2021)

- Location of Zigetangcuo Lake in the Tibet Autonomous Region of China.
- Location: Nagqu Prefecture, Tibet Autonomous Region
- Coordinates: 32°00′N 90°44′E
- Type: meromictic
- Basin countries: China
- Surface area: 187 km^{2} (72 sq mi)
- Surface elevation: 4,560 m (14,960 ft)

Tsige Dartso (Tibetan: ཙི་གེ་དར་མཚོ, Wylie: tsi ge dar mtsho, ZWPY: Tsige Dartso) or Zigetangcuo Lake (Chinese: 兹格塘错; pinyin: Zīgétáng cuò) is a crenogenic meromictic lake in the North Tibetan Plateau. It is located in Nagqu Prefecture, north of Dongqiao. It has an area of 187 square kilometers at an altitude of 4560 meters. It is the meromictic lake with the highest known altitude.
