= Xining–Chengdu high-speed railway =

Railway line in China

Overview
- Locale: China
- Termini: Xining; Chengdu East
- Stations: 29

Service
- Type: Higher-speed rail

Technical
- Line length: 863.5 km (536.6 mi)
- Number of tracks: 2
- Operating speed: 200 km/h (120 mph)

Xining–Chengdu high-speed railway (西宁至成都高速铁路), is a higher-speed railway line currently under construction in China. The line is 863.5 kilometres (536.6 miles) long and has a design speed of 200 kilometres per hour (120 mph).

== History ==
Construction of Haidong West to Huangshengguan section of the railway started on 29 October 2022.

== Stations ==
Station Name	Chinese	Metro transfers/connections
Xining	西宁	
Haidong West	海东西	
Hualong	化隆	
Jianzha	尖扎	
Tongren	同仁	
Ganjia	甘加	
Xiahe	夏河	
Hezuo	合作	
Luqu	碌曲	
Langmusi	郎木寺	
Huahu	花湖	
Axi	阿西	
Ruoergai	若尔盖	
Banyou	班佑	
Hongyuan	红原	
Huangshengguan	黄胜关	
Chuanzhusi	川主寺	
Songpan	松潘	
Zhenjiangguan	镇江关	
Taiping	太平	
Longtang	龙塘	
Maoxian	茂县	
Gaochuan	高川	
Anxian	安县	
Mianzhu South	绵竹南	
Shifang West	什邡西	
Sanxingdui	三星堆	
Qingbaijiang East	青白江东	
Chengdu East	成都东	2 7
