= Qinglong Township, Tibet =

Township in Baingoin County, Nagqu, Tibet, China

Coordinates: 31°10′N 90°38′E

Qinglung (ཕྱིང་ལུང་, Qinglong-xiang 青龙乡) is a township in Baingoin County, Tibet Autonomous Region, People's Republic of China.

== See also ==
- List of towns and villages in Tibet
