= Mentang =

Township in Nagqu, Tibet, China

Coordinates: 31°24′N 89°42′E

Mentang Raktsek (མན་ཐང་རགས་རྩེག་, Mendang-xiang 门当乡) is a township in Baingoin County, Tibet Autonomous Region, People's Republic of China.

The township is situated on an elevation of 4,617 metres (15,148 ft.) and rests in the south west part of China. Neighboring locations consist of Lhasa, Shannan, and Xigatse, which all remain in the southwest part of China.

== See also ==
- List of towns and villages in Tibet
