= Xênkyêr =

Xenkyer
- Location within Tibet
- Coordinates: 30°34′0″N 89°42′0″E
- Country: China
- Region: Tibet

Population
  - Total
  - Major Nationalities: Tibetan
  - Regional dialect: Tibetan language
- Time zone: +8

Xênkyêr(ཤི་འཁྱེར, Xinjixiang 新吉乡) is a township of Baingoin County, Tibet Autonomous Region, People's Republic of China.

== History ==
In 1960, Xinji Township was built. In 1970, it was changed to a commune. In 1980, the township was reformed again. In 1987, the original Xinji Township and Tuanjie Township were merged into the new Xinji Township.

== Administrative division ==
As of 2022, Xinji Township has jurisdiction over 9 administrative villages; Quqiu Village, Lubu Village, Nuodi Village, Lugan Village, Qusen Village, Zana Village, Guga Village, Qiangdu Village, and Qiangmei Village The Township People's Government is stationed in Nuodi Village.

== See also ==
- List of towns and villages in Tibet
