= Nyima Township, Baingoin =

Township in Baingoin County, Nagqu, Tibet, China

Coordinates: 31.06°N 91.04°E

Nyima (ཉི་མ་, Nima-xiang 尼玛乡) is a township of Baingoin County, Tibet Autonomous Region, People's Republic of China.

It has eight constituent villages: 吾前村, 杂空村, 达果村, 塞龙村, 下地村, 琼果村, 尼德村, 沙吉村.
