= Baingoin County =

Baingoin County 班戈县 • དཔལ་མགོན་རྫོང་། Bangor
- County
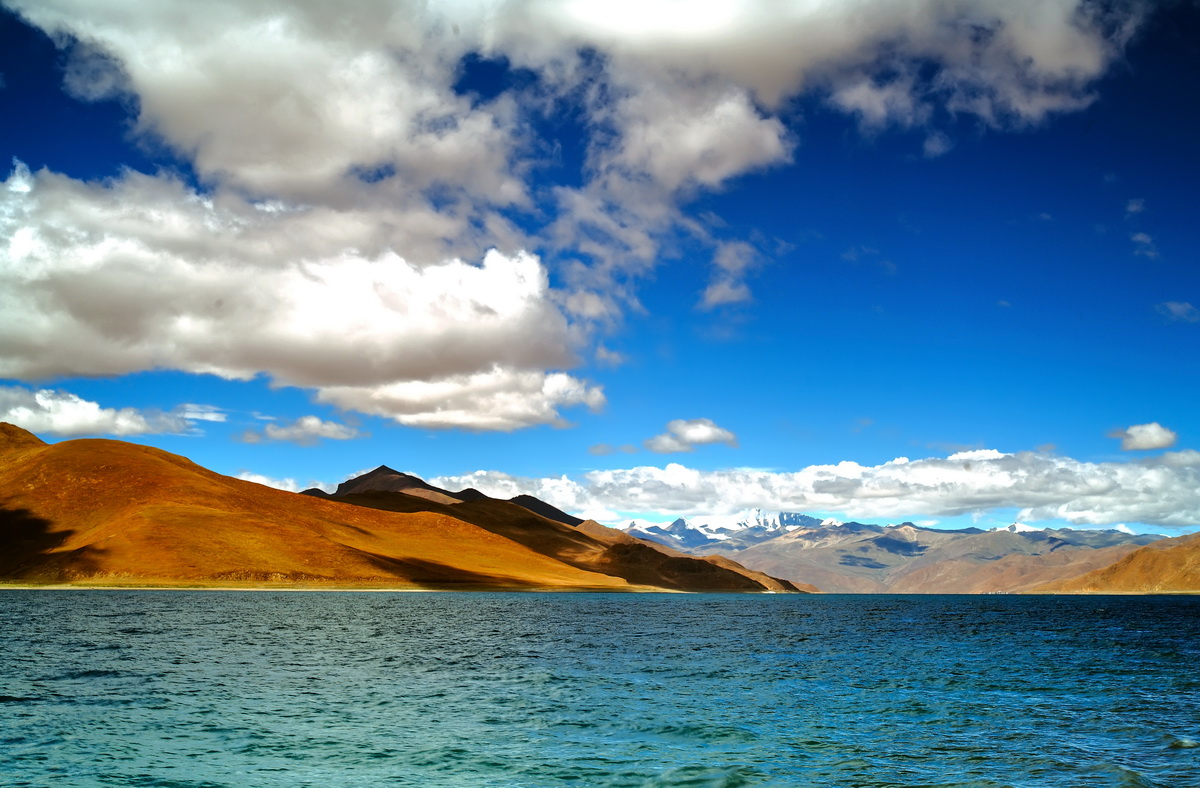
- Nam Tso

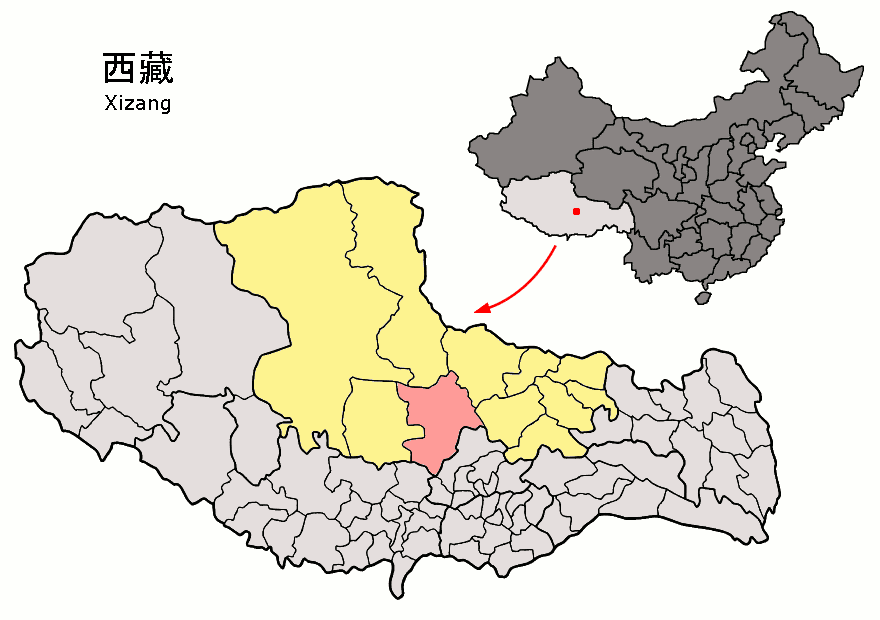
- Location of Baingoin County (red) in Nagqu City (yellow) and the Tibet Autonomous Region

- Location of the seat in the Tibet Autonomous Region Baingoin (China)
- Coordinates: 31°23′33″N 90°00′36″E
- Country: China
- Autonomous region: Tibet
- Prefecture-level city: Nagqu
- County seat: Phukpa

Area
  - Total: 28,383 km^{2} (10,959 sq mi)

Population (2020)
  - Total: 39,309
  - Density: 1.3849/km^{2} (3.5870/sq mi)
- Time zone: UTC+8 (China Standard)
- Website: www.xzbg.gov.cn

Baingoin County

Chinese name
- Simplified Chinese: 班戈县
- Traditional Chinese: 班戈縣
Transcriptions
Standard Mandarin
- Hanyu Pinyin: Bāngé Xiàn
Yue: Cantonese
- Jyutping: baan^{1}gwo^{1} jyun^{2}

Tibetan name
- Tibetan: དཔལ་མགོན་རྫོང་།
Transcriptions
- Wylie: dpal mgon rdzong
- Tibetan Pinyin: Baingoin Zong

Baingoin County (Tibetan: དཔལ་མགོན་རྫོང་།; Chinese: 班戈县), formerly Namru Dzong (Tibetan: གནམ་རུ་རྫོང), is a county within Nagqu of the Tibet Autonomous Region, China.

Baingoin County got the name from the Baingoin Co (Bangor Co) which is a lake in center of the county. The county lies between lakes Namtso and Siling.

== Administrative divisions ==
The county is divided into 4 towns and 6 townships:

Name	Chinese	Hanyu Pinyin	Tibetan	Wylie	location
Towns
Phukpa Town	普保镇	Pǔbǎo zhèn	ཕུག་པ་གྲོང་རྡལ།	phug pa grong rdal	31.4°N 90.0°E
Bella Town	北拉镇	Běilā zhèn	བལ་ལ་གྲོང་རྡལ།	bal la grong rdal	31.4°N 90.8°E
Dechen Town	德庆镇	Déqìng zhèn	བདེ་ཆེན་གྲོང་རྡལ།	sde chen grong rdal	30.5°N 90.1°E
Jakhyung Town	佳琼镇	Jiāqióng zhèn	བྱ་ཁྱུང་གྲོང་རྡལ།	bya khyung grong rdal	31.6°N 90.6°E
Townships
Nyima Township	尼玛乡	Nímǎ xiāng	ཉི་མ་ཤང་།	nyi ma shang	31.1°N 91.0°E
Boqê Township	保吉乡	Bǎojí xiāng	སྤོ་ཆེ་ཤང་།	spo che shang	31.0°N 90.2°E
Qinglung Township	青龙乡	Qīnglóng xiāng	ཕྱིང་ལུང་ཤང་།	phying lung shang	31.2°N 90.6°E
Machen Township	马前乡	Mǎqián xiāng	མ་ཆེན་ཤང་།	ma chen shang	31.6°N 90.2°E
Mentang Township (Mentang Raktsek)	门当乡	Méndāng xiāng	མན་ཐང་ཤང་།	man thang shang	31.4°N 89.7°E
Xênkyêr Township	新吉乡	Xīnjí xiāng	ཤི་འཁྱེར་ཤང་།	shi 'khyer shang	30.6°N 89.8°E

== Climate ==
Climate data for Baingoin, elevation 4,700 m (15,400 ft), (1991–2020 normals)
Month	Jan	Feb	Mar	Apr	May	Jun	Jul	Aug	Sep	Oct	Nov	Dec	Year
Record high °C (°F)	9.4 (48.9)	9.5 (49.1)	14.0 (57.2)	14.2 (57.6)	19.7 (67.5)	23.2 (73.8)	22.5 (72.5)	20.6 (69.1)	19.9 (67.8)	17.2 (63.0)	11.6 (52.9)	15.1 (59.2)	23.2 (73.8)
Mean daily maximum °C (°F)	−3.9 (25.0)	−2.0 (28.4)	1.6 (34.9)	5.8 (42.4)	10.1 (50.2)	14.6 (58.3)	15.2 (59.4)	14.4 (57.9)	12.6 (54.7)	6.8 (44.2)	1.3 (34.3)	−1.9 (28.6)	6.2 (43.2)
Daily mean °C (°F)	−10.0 (14.0)	−7.8 (18.0)	−4.3 (24.3)	−0.5 (31.1)	3.7 (38.7)	8.2 (46.8)	9.4 (48.9)	8.8 (47.8)	6.5 (43.7)	0.5 (32.9)	−5.1 (22.8)	−8.3 (17.1)	0.1 (32.2)
Mean daily minimum °C (°F)	−16.3 (2.7)	−13.7 (7.3)	−10.1 (13.8)	−6.3 (20.7)	−2.1 (28.2)	2.6 (36.7)	4.6 (40.3)	4.1 (39.4)	1.8 (35.2)	−4.7 (23.5)	−10.9 (12.4)	−14.8 (5.4)	−5.5 (22.1)
Record low °C (°F)	−42.9 (−45.2)	−37.6 (−35.7)	−30.5 (−22.9)	−19.6 (−3.3)	−15.2 (4.6)	−7.7 (18.1)	−6.6 (20.1)	−4.6 (23.7)	−9.2 (15.4)	−21.7 (−7.1)	−39.4 (−38.9)	−42.7 (−44.9)	−42.9 (−45.2)
Average precipitation mm (inches)	2.6 (0.10)	2.3 (0.09)	3.7 (0.15)	6.5 (0.26)	25.4 (1.00)	59.8 (2.35)	92.2 (3.63)	83.5 (3.29)	56.0 (2.20)	10.3 (0.41)	2.2 (0.09)	1.9 (0.07)	346.4 (13.64)
Average precipitation days (≥ 0.1 mm)	3.9	3.7	4.5	6.9	12.3	17.2	21.0	20.3	16.6	6.0	2.6	2.7	117.7
Average snowy days	6.1	6.0	8.2	10.9	16.3	7.9	0.8	1.3	7.4	8.7	4.4	4.7	82.7
Average relative humidity (%)	30	28	29	36	46	55	63	65	61	43	33	29	43
Mean monthly sunshine hours	227.3	210.3	241.3	246.9	262.2	239.3	202.7	195.2	220.2	261.5	247.5	240.7	2,795.1
Percentage possible sunshine	70	67	64	63	61	57	47	48	60	75	79	77	64
Source 1: China Meteorological Administration
Source 2: Météo Climat (extremes)
