= Nyainrong =

- Town

Tibetan transcription(s)

Chinese transcription(s)
- Location within Tibet
- Coordinates: 32°6′36″N 92°18′6″E
- Country: China
- Autonomous region: Tibet
- Prefecture: Nagqu Prefecture
- County: Nyainrong County
- Time zone: UTC+8 (CST)

Nyainrong is a small town and seat of Nyainrong County, Nagqu Prefecture, northern Tibet.
