= Boqê =

Town in Baingoin County, Tibet

Coordinates: 30°58′N 90°12′E

Baoji (also known as Boqê and Poche) (Tibetan: སྤོ་ཆེ; Chinese: 保吉乡; pinyin: Bǎojíxiāng) is a township in Baingoin County, Tibet Autonomous Region, People's Republic of China. It lies at an altitude of 4,785 metres (15,702 feet).

== See also ==
- List of towns and villages in Tibet Autonomous Region
