= Yurla (dish) =

Tibetan pastry

- Type: Pastry
- Place of origin: Tibet
- Main ingredients: Wheat flour, butter

In Tibetan cuisine, Yurla is a wheat pastry with butter, particularly common in Nyainrong County in northern Tibet.

== See also ==
- List of pastries
- List of Tibetan dishes
