= Nyainrong County =

Nyainrong County 聂荣县 • སྙན་རོང་རྫོང་།
- County
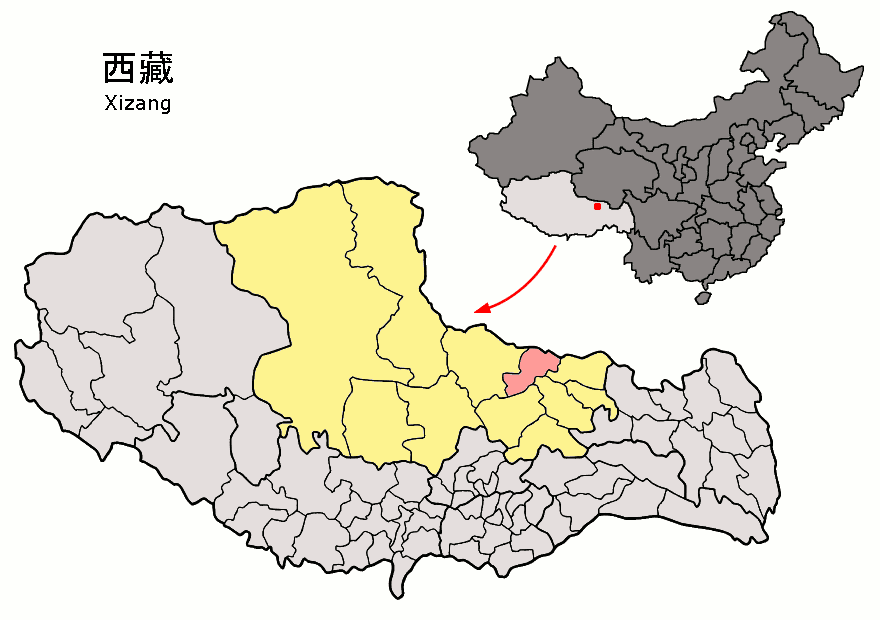
- Location of Nyainrong County (red) within Nagqu City (yellow) and the Tibet AR

- Location of the seat in the Tibet AR Nyainrong (China)
- Coordinates (Nyainrong government): 32°06′29″N 92°18′11″E
- Country: China
- Autonomous region: Tibet
- Prefecture-level city: Nagqu
- County seat: Nyainrong

Area
  - Total: 9,017 km^{2} (3,481 sq mi)
- Elevation: 4,700 m (15,400 ft)

Population (2020)
  - Total: 35,163
  - Density: 3.900/km^{2} (10.10/sq mi)
- Time zone: UTC+8 (China Standard)
- Postal code: 853500
- Area code: +(086)0896
- Website: www.xznr.gov.cn

Nyainrong County

Chinese name
- Simplified Chinese: 聂荣县
- Traditional Chinese: 聶榮縣
Transcriptions
Standard Mandarin
- Hanyu Pinyin: Nièróng Xiàn

Tibetan name
- Tibetan: སྙན་རོང་རྫོང་།
Transcriptions
- Wylie: snyan rong rdzong
- Tibetan Pinyin: Nyainrong Zong

Nyainrong County (Tibetan: སྙན་རོང་རྫོང་།; Chinese: 聂荣县) is a small county under the administration of the prefecture-level city of Nagqu, in the north of the Tibet Autonomous Region, China, bordering Qinghai province to the north. Yurla is a favourite of the people of the county.

== Administrative divisions ==
The county contains the following 1 town and 9 townships:

Name	Chinese	Hanyu Pinyin	Tibetan	Wylie
Town
Nyainrong Town	聂荣镇	Nièróng zhèn	གཉན་རོང་གྲོང་རྡལ།	snyan rong grong rdal
Townships
Nyima Township	尼玛乡	Nímǎ xiāng	ཉི་མ་ཤང་།	nyi ma shang
Serchen Township	色庆乡	Sèqìng xiāng	གསེར་ཆེན་ཤང་།	gser chen shang
Trolung Township	桑荣乡	Sāngróng xiāng	ཁྲོ་ལུང་ཤང་།	khrong lung shang
Shakchu Township	下曲乡	Xiàqǔ xiāng	ཤག་ཆུ་ཤང་།	shog chu shang
Bezhung Township	白雄乡	Báixióng xiāng	བེ་གཞུང་ཤང་།	be gzhung shang
Sokzhung Township	索雄乡	Suǒxióng xiāng	སོག་གཞུང་ཤང་།	sog gzhung shang
Damgyang Township (Damshung)	当木江乡	Dāngmùjiāng xiāng	འདམ་རྒྱང་ཤང་།	'dam rgyang shang
Chadam Township	查当乡	Chádāng xiāng	ཁྲ་འདམ་ཤང་།	khra 'dam shang
Yongchu Township	永曲乡	Yǒngqǔ xiāng	ཡོང་ཆུ་ཤང་།	yong chu shang
