= Amdo County =

Amdo County 安多县 • ཨ་མདོ་རྫོང་།
- County
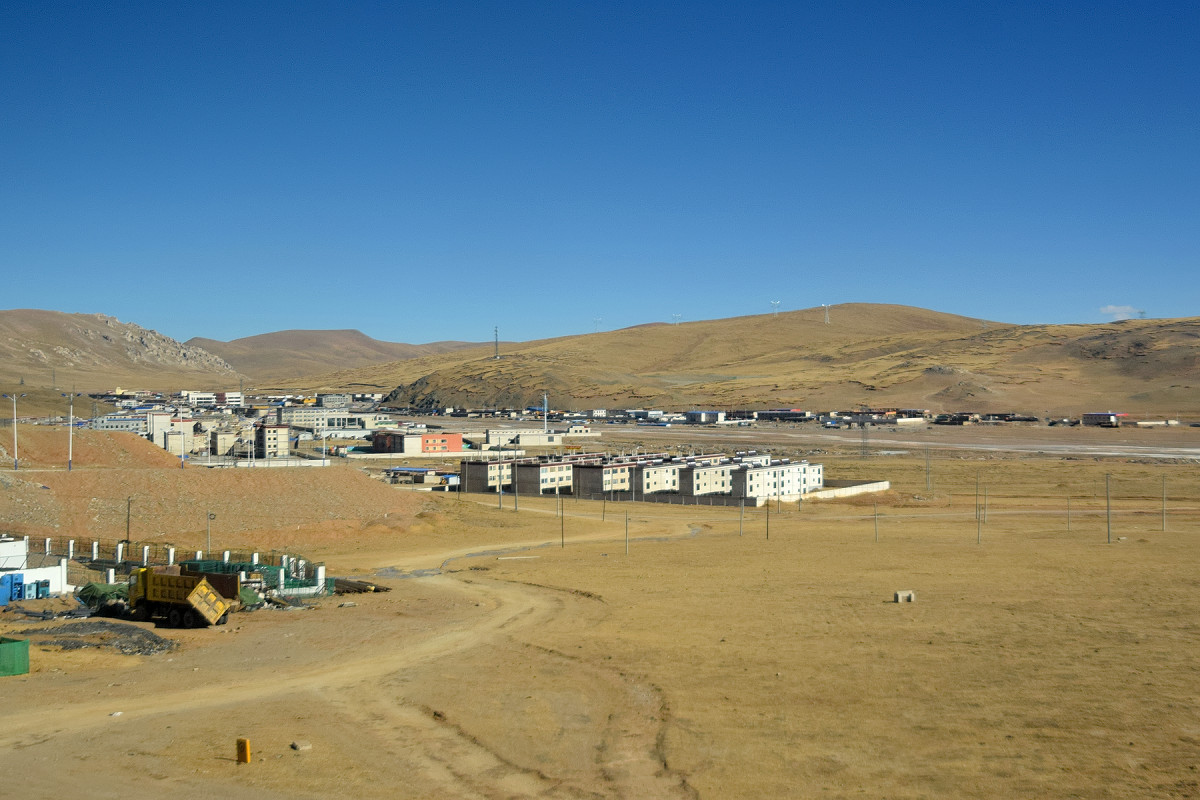

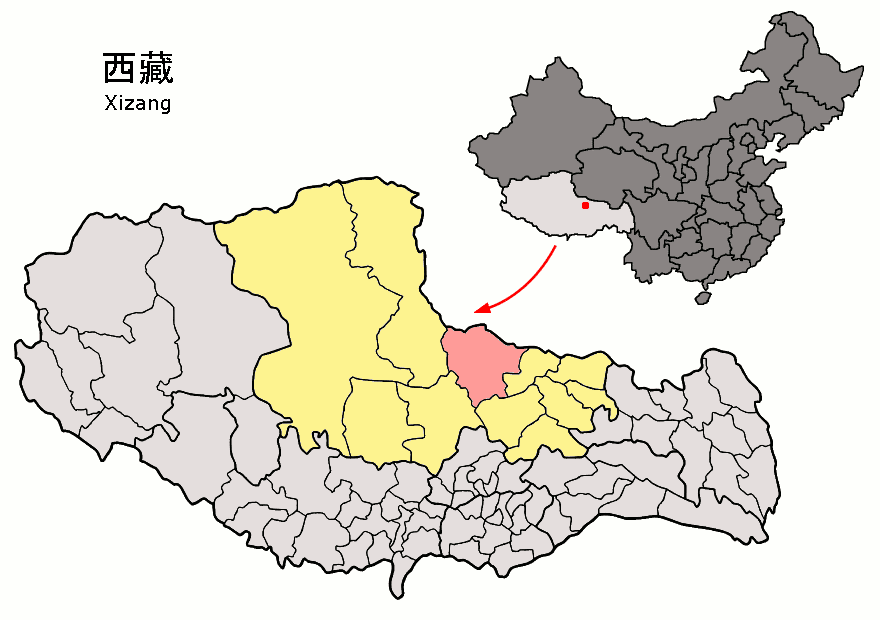
- Location of Amdo County within Tibet Autonomous Region

- Location of the seat in Tibet Autonomous Region Amdo County (China)
- Coordinates: 32°15′50″N 91°40′50″E
- Country: China
- Autonomous region: Tibet
- Prefecture-level city: Nagqu
- County seat: Pagnag

Area
  - Total: 43,410.85 km^{2} (16,761.02 sq mi)

Population (2020)
  - Total: 39,683
  - Density: 0.91413/km^{2} (2.3676/sq mi)
- Time zone: UTC+8 (China Standard)
- Website: www.xzad.gov.cn

Amdo County

Chinese name
- Simplified Chinese: 安多县
- Traditional Chinese: 安多縣
Transcriptions
Standard Mandarin
- Hanyu Pinyin: Ānduō Xiàn
Yue: Cantonese
- Jyutping: ngon^{1}do^{1} jyun^{2}

Tibetan name
- Tibetan: ཨ་མདོ་རྫོང་།
Transcriptions
- Wylie: a mdo rdzong
- Tibetan Pinyin: Amdo Zong

Amdo County (Tibetan: ཨ་མདོ་རྫོང་; Chinese: 安多县) is a county within Nagqu of the Tibet Autonomous Region of China. The county covers an area of 43,410.85 square kilometres and is dominated by mainly by Tibetan grassland. In 2000 it had a population of 32,843 .

Its capital is Amdo Town, north of Lhasa. It contains the Amdo railway station on the new railway from Golmud to Lhasa. There is a major rail depot 3 km (1.9 mi) west of the town. Cona Lake lies to the southwest of the town of Amdo.

== Administrative divisions ==
Amdo county contains the following 4 towns and 9 townships:

Name	Chinese	Hanyu Pinyin	Tibetan	Wylie
Towns
Pagnag Town	帕那镇	Pànà zhèn	བྲག་ནག་གྲོང་རྡལ།	brag nag grong rdal
Qangma Town	强玛镇	Qiángmǎ zhèn	བྱང་མ་གྲོང་རྡལ།	byang ma grong rdal
Zaring Town	扎仁镇	Zhārén zhèn	ཁྲ་རིང་གྲོང་རྡལ།	khra ring grong rdal
Yanshipin Town*	雁石坪镇	Yànshípíng zhèn	ཡན་ཤིས་ཕིན་གྲོང་རྡལ།	yan shis phin grong rdal
Townships
Töma Township*	多玛乡	Duōmǎ xiāng	སྟོད་མ་ཤང་།	stod ma shang
Marchu Township*	玛曲乡	Mǎqǔ xiāng	དམར་ཆུ་ཤང་།	dmar chu shang
Dardü Township	滩堆乡	Tānduī xiāng	དར་མདུད་ཤང་།	dar mdud shang
Bangmer Township	帮爱乡	Bāng'ài xiāng	སྦང་མེར་ཤང་།	sbang mer shang
Marrong Township*	玛荣乡	Mǎróng xiāng	དམར་རོང་ཤང་།	dmar rong shang
Zhachu Township (Sibnak Chenchungo)	扎曲乡	Zhāqǔ xiāng	བཀྲ་ཆུ་ཤང་།	bra chu shang
Sewu Township*	色务乡	Sèwù xiāng	སེའུ་ཤང་།	se'u shang
Coma Township	措玛乡	Cuòmǎ xiāng	མཚོ་དམར་ཤང་།	mtsho dmar shang
Gangnyi Township*	岗尼乡	Gǎngní xiāng	སྐང་གཉིས་ཤང་།	skang gnyis shang
* Although being administered by Amdo County, Yanshipin, Gangnyi, Marchu, Sewu, Marrong and Töma are partially or entirely located within the borders of Qinghai province.

== Climate ==
Climate data for Amdo, elevation 4,800 m (15,700 ft), (1991–2020 normals)
Month	Jan	Feb	Mar	Apr	May	Jun	Jul	Aug	Sep	Oct	Nov	Dec	Year
Mean daily maximum °C (°F)	−5.5 (22.1)	−2.8 (27.0)	1.3 (34.3)	5.5 (41.9)	9.4 (48.9)	13.3 (55.9)	14.4 (57.9)	14.0 (57.2)	11.6 (52.9)	5.9 (42.6)	0.1 (32.2)	−3.6 (25.5)	5.3 (41.5)
Daily mean °C (°F)	−13.6 (7.5)	−10.7 (12.7)	−6.5 (20.3)	−2.1 (28.2)	2.5 (36.5)	6.7 (44.1)	8.4 (47.1)	8.1 (46.6)	5.2 (41.4)	−1.2 (29.8)	−8.2 (17.2)	−12.3 (9.9)	−2.0 (28.4)
Mean daily minimum °C (°F)	−20.8 (−5.4)	−18.1 (−0.6)	−13.8 (7.2)	−8.6 (16.5)	−3.3 (26.1)	1.6 (34.9)	3.8 (38.8)	3.5 (38.3)	0.7 (33.3)	−6.4 (20.5)	−14.6 (5.7)	−19.6 (−3.3)	−8.0 (17.7)
Average precipitation mm (inches)	3.5 (0.14)	2.3 (0.09)	4.1 (0.16)	10.5 (0.41)	35.8 (1.41)	91.8 (3.61)	115.6 (4.55)	108.8 (4.28)	73.3 (2.89)	14.4 (0.57)	2.8 (0.11)	1.7 (0.07)	464.6 (18.29)
Average precipitation days (≥ 0.1 mm)	4.0	3.5	4.0	6.6	13.5	19.1	21.3	20.1	17.4	7.6	2.8	1.8	121.7
Average snowy days	5.8	6.2	8.1	10.1	17.0	9.2	1.7	1.8	9.2	10.6	5.1	3.5	88.3
Average relative humidity (%)	43	40	38	44	54	64	67	68	68	53	45	40	52
Mean monthly sunshine hours	231.6	215.1	242.0	246.7	258.9	231.3	218.3	214.7	218.4	256.8	248.3	244.5	2,826.6
Percentage possible sunshine	72	68	65	63	60	54	51	53	60	74	80	79	65
Source: China Meteorological Administration

== Transportation ==
Amdo railway station offers a train operated once every 2 days to Lhasa, Lanzhou and Xining respectively. National highway G109 also passes downtown Amdo county.

== Gallery ==
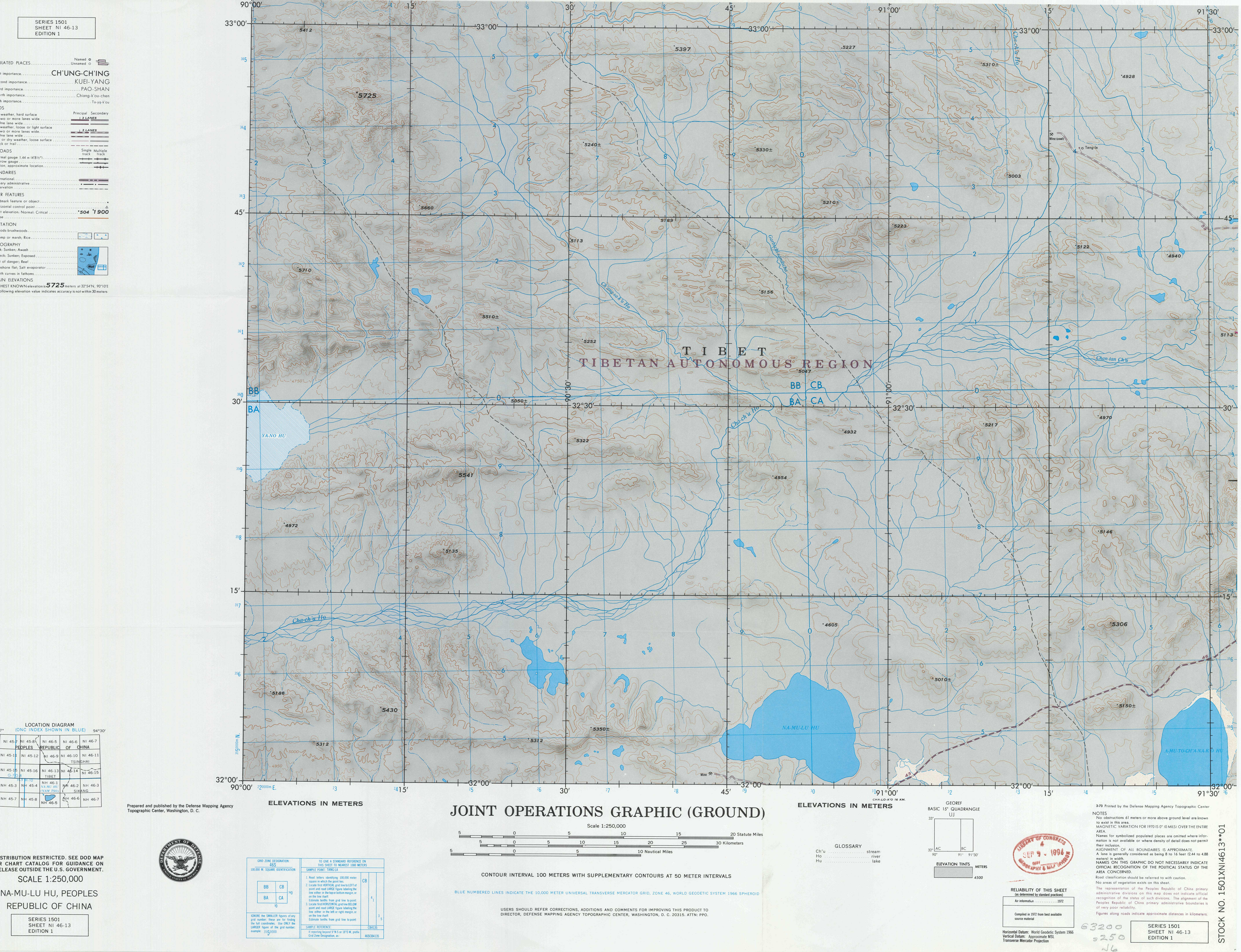

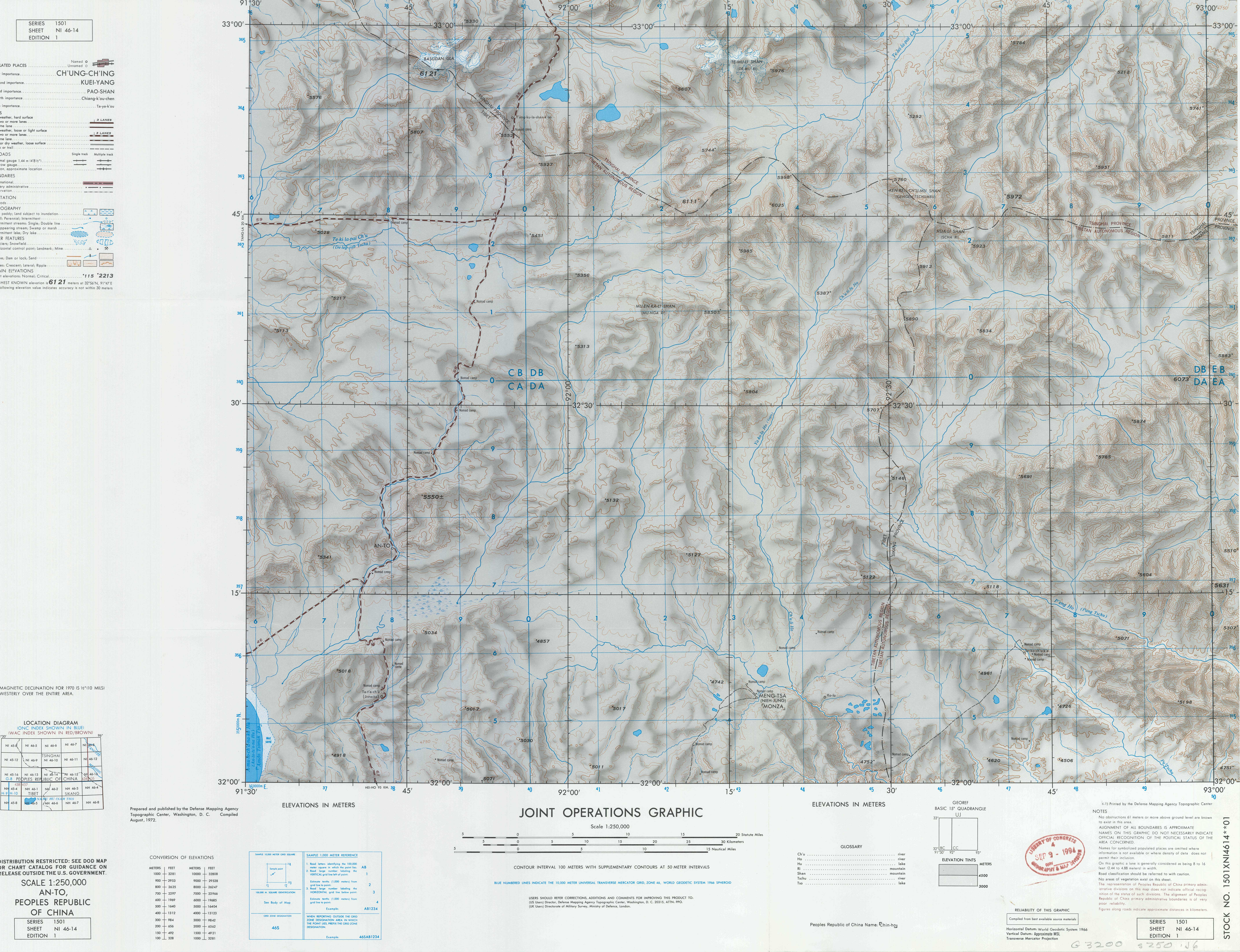
