= Xining railway station =

Railway station in Xining, China

Xining 西宁
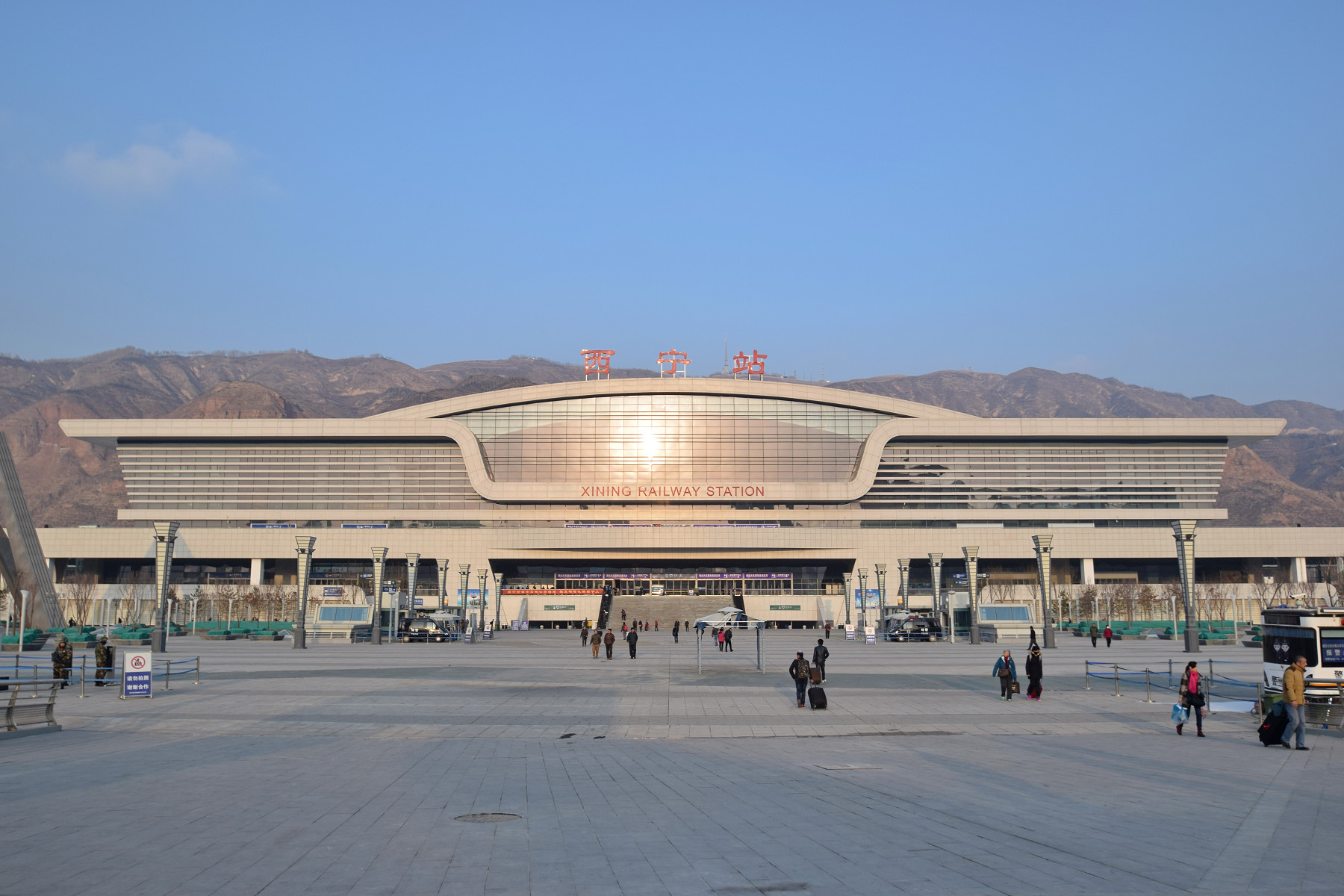
- Xining railway station

General information
- Location: Qilian Lu, Chengdong District, Xining, Qinghai; China
- Coordinates: 36°37′13″N 101°48′45″E
- Operated by: China Railway
- Lines: Lanzhou–Qinghai Railway; Qinghai–Tibet Railway; Lanzhou–Xinjiang High-Speed Railway; Xining–Chengdu high-speed railway (U/C)
- Platforms: 17 (8 island platforms, 1 side platform)
- Connections: Bus terminal

History
- Opened: 1959

Services
Preceding station	China Railway	Following station
Haidong towards Lanzhou	Lanzhou–Xinjiang railway	Menyuan towards Ürümqi South
Xining East towards Lanzhou	Lanzhou–Qinghai railway	Terminus
Terminus	Qinghai–Tibet railway	Xiaoqiao towards Lhasa
Location

Xining railway station (simplified Chinese: 西宁站; traditional Chinese: 西寧站; pinyin: Xīníng Zhàn) is the main railway station serving the city of Xining in Qinghai, China. It is the first station on the Qinghai–Tibet Railway which connects the city with Lhasa in Tibet.

== History ==
The station opened in 1959. It underwent a major expansion in time for the opening of the Lanzhou–Xinjiang High-Speed Railway in December 2014.

== Gallery ==
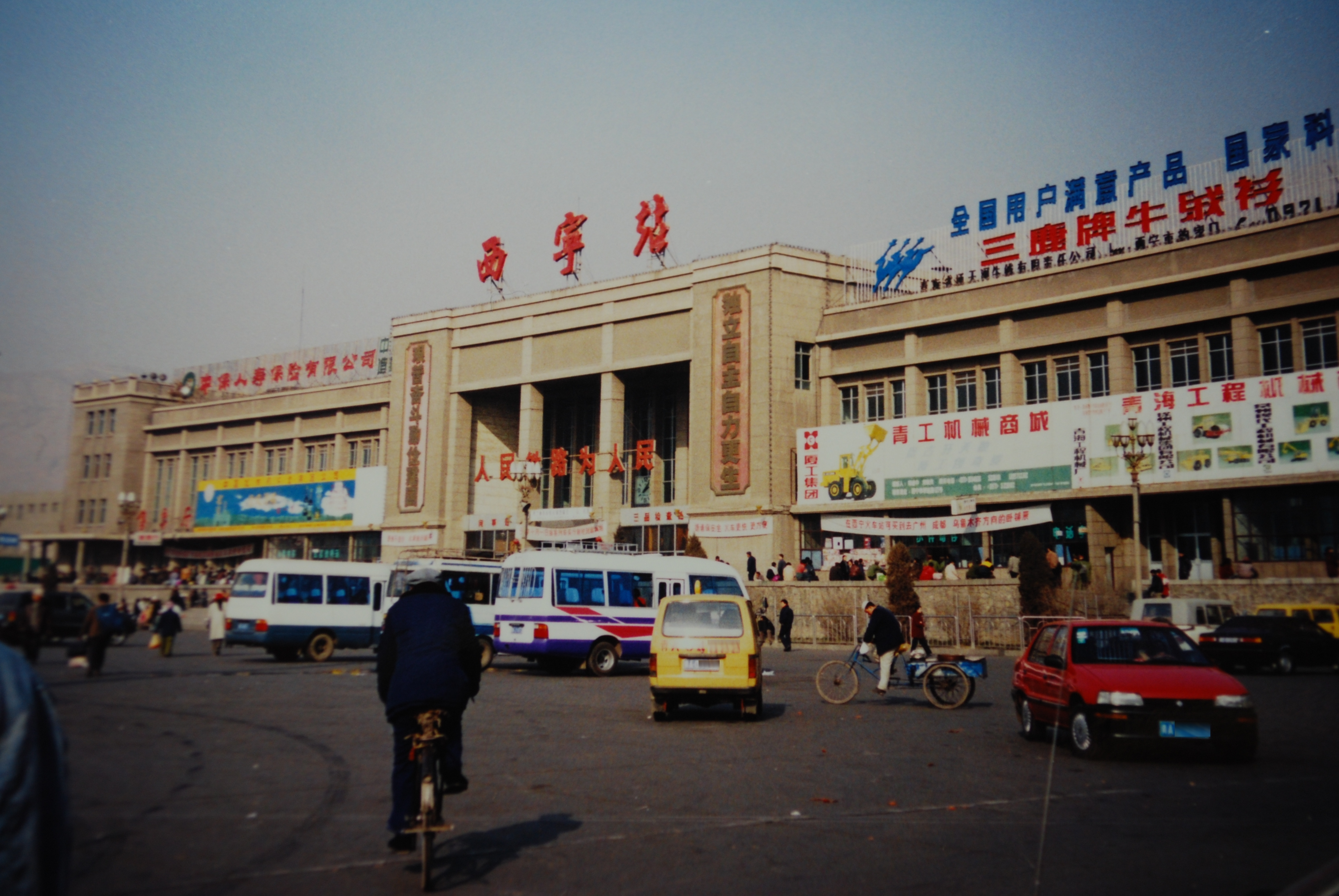
Old Xining station Exterior

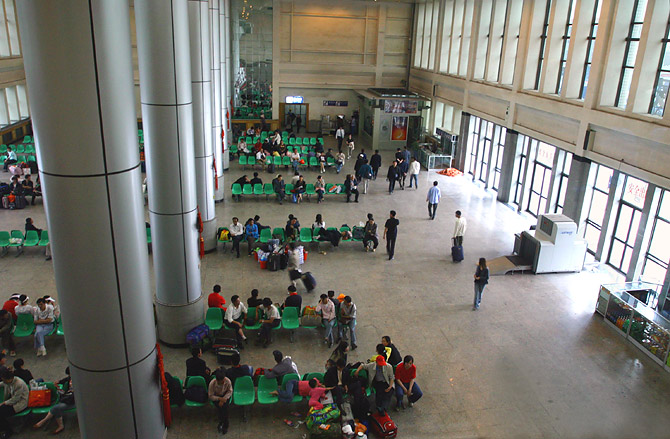
Interior waiting area

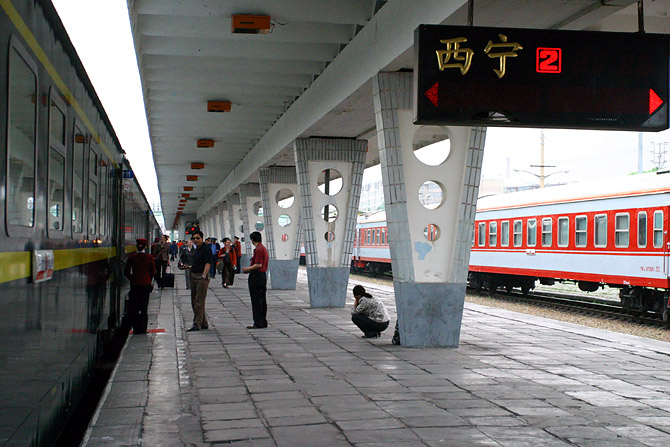
Railway platform

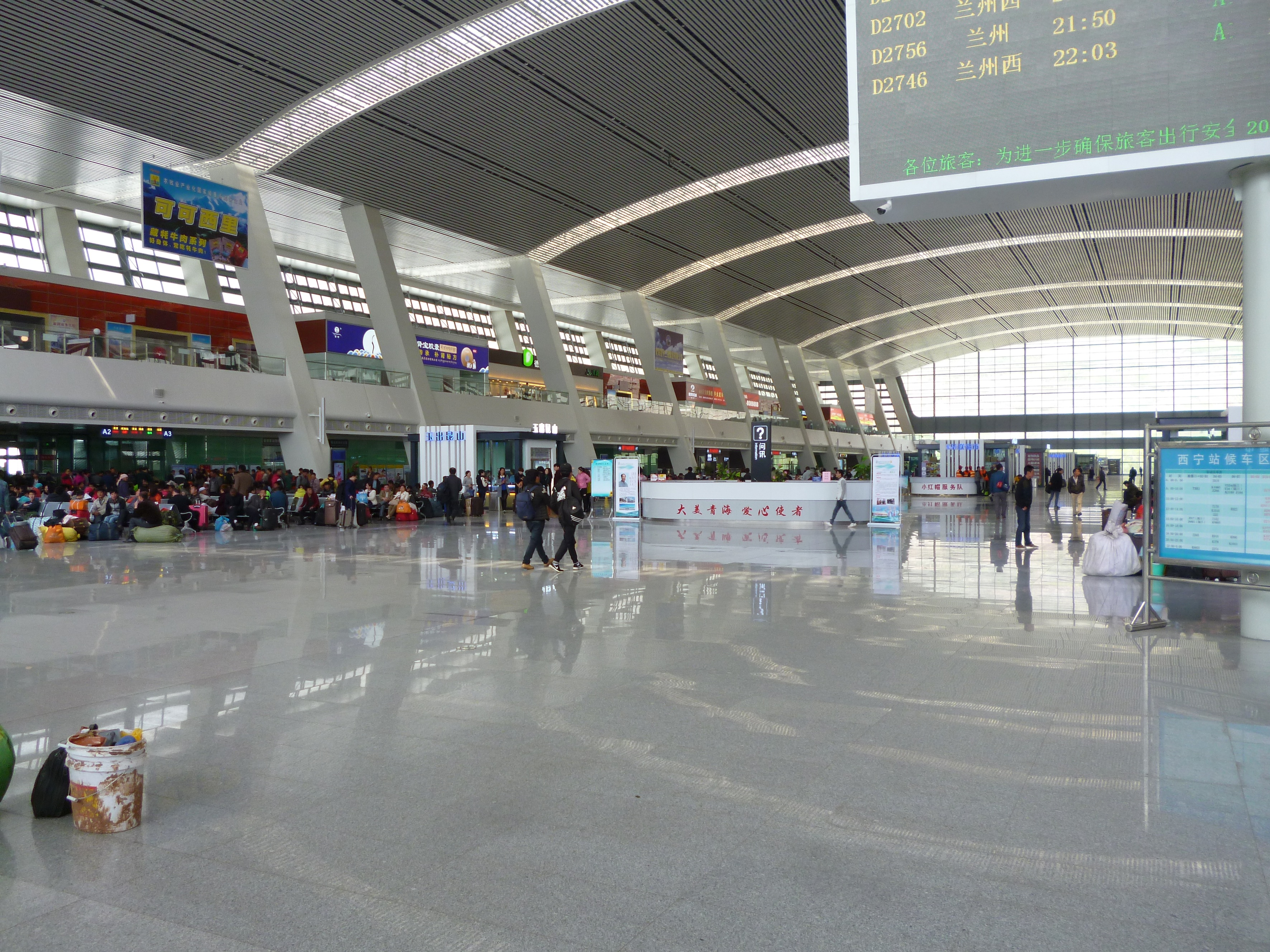
Interior of the rebuilt Xining Railway Station in May 2015

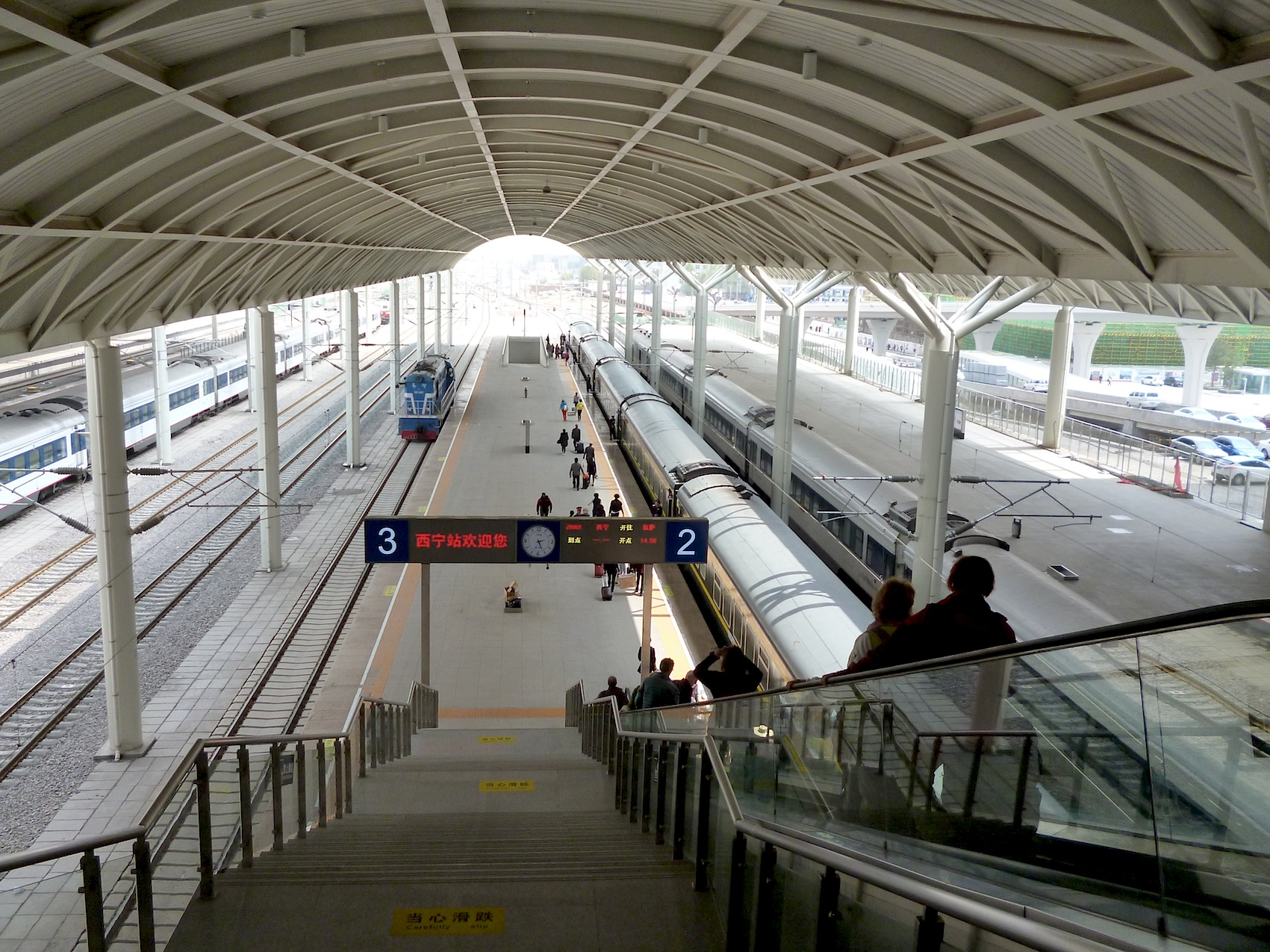
Platforms 2 and 3

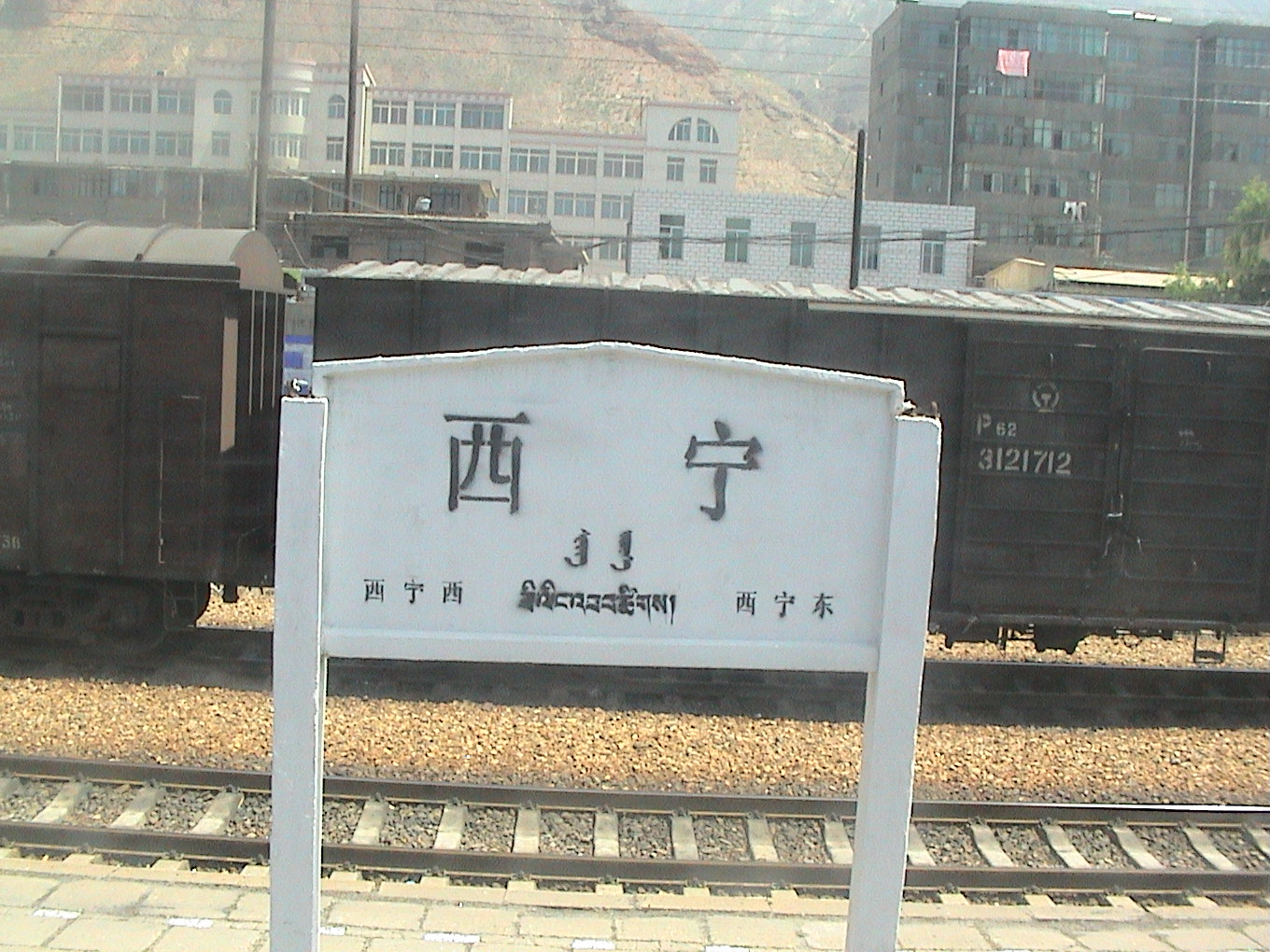
Station Sign

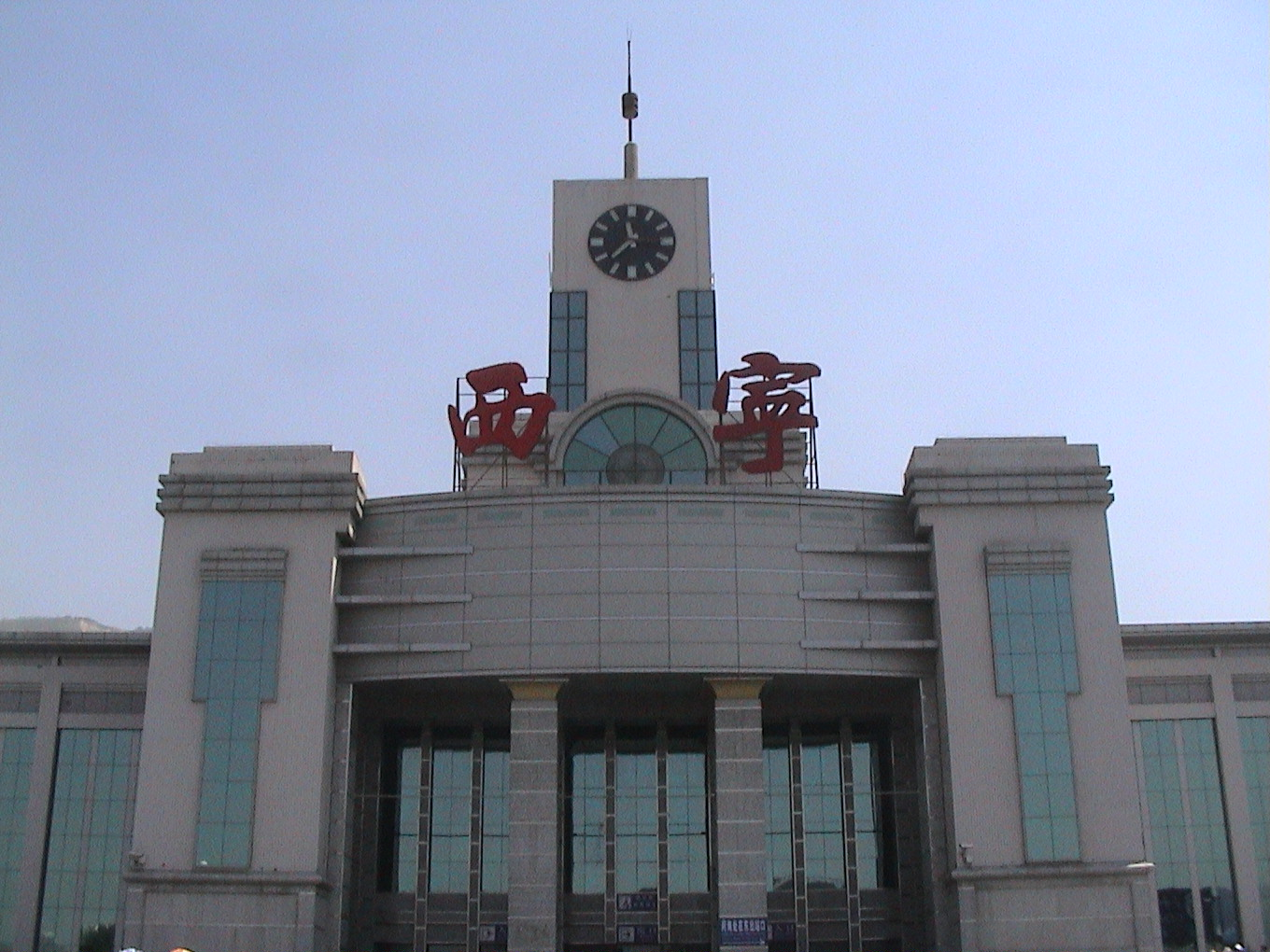
Station Building

== See also ==
- List of stations on Qinghai–Tibet railway
