= Pana, Tibet =

Pana
- Town
- Location within Tibet
- Coordinates: 32°15′45″N 91°40′42″E
- Country: China
- Autonomous region: Tibet
- Prefecture: Nagqu Prefecture
- County: Amdo County
- Elevation: 4,710 m (15,450 ft)

Population (2004)
  - Total: 2,700
  - Major Nationalities: Tibetan
  - Regional dialect: Tibetan language
- Time zone: +8

Pana, or Pagnag (Chinese: 帕那镇), also known as Anduo, or Amdo, is a town and the seat of Amdo County in the Nagqu Prefecture of the Tibet Autonomous Region, in China. It lies 464 kilometres north of Lhasa and 138 km north of Nagqu. As of 2004 its jurisdiction had a population of about 2700, 683 of which were living in the town of Pana. The principal economic activity is animal husbandry, pastoral yak, goat, sheep, and so on. Blueschist outcrops are found in the area. The villagers in recent times organized a railway protecting committee to select locals to monitor the Qinghai-Tibet Railway.

"Constructed on the southern side of the Dangla Mountains, Amdo is a Chinese-style town on the Qinghai-Tibet Highway. The road here leads off to the west, heading towards the Mt. Kailash area via the Changthang Plateau. Many of the buses from Golmud to Lhasa used to stay overnight here."

At an elevation of 4,710 metres (15,450 ft), Amdo is one of the highest year-round settlements in the world. It is now closed to tourists on the 1,130 km journey between Golmud and Lhasa. It is south of the Tanggula Shankou Pass (5,206 metres (17,080 ft)) on the border of Qinghai and Tibet, the highest pass between Lhasa and Golmud.

== Administrative divisions ==
The township-level division contains 42 villages and four village committees which are as follows:

- Pana Neighborhood (帕纳居委会)
- Zhaliejin Village (扎烈金村)
- Turuo Village (土若村)
- Jiage Kagang Village (甲格卡岗村)

== See also ==
- List of towns and villages in Tibet
