= Nagqu =

Nagqu 那曲市 ནག་ཆུ་གྲོང་ཁྱེར། Nagchu
- Prefecture-level city
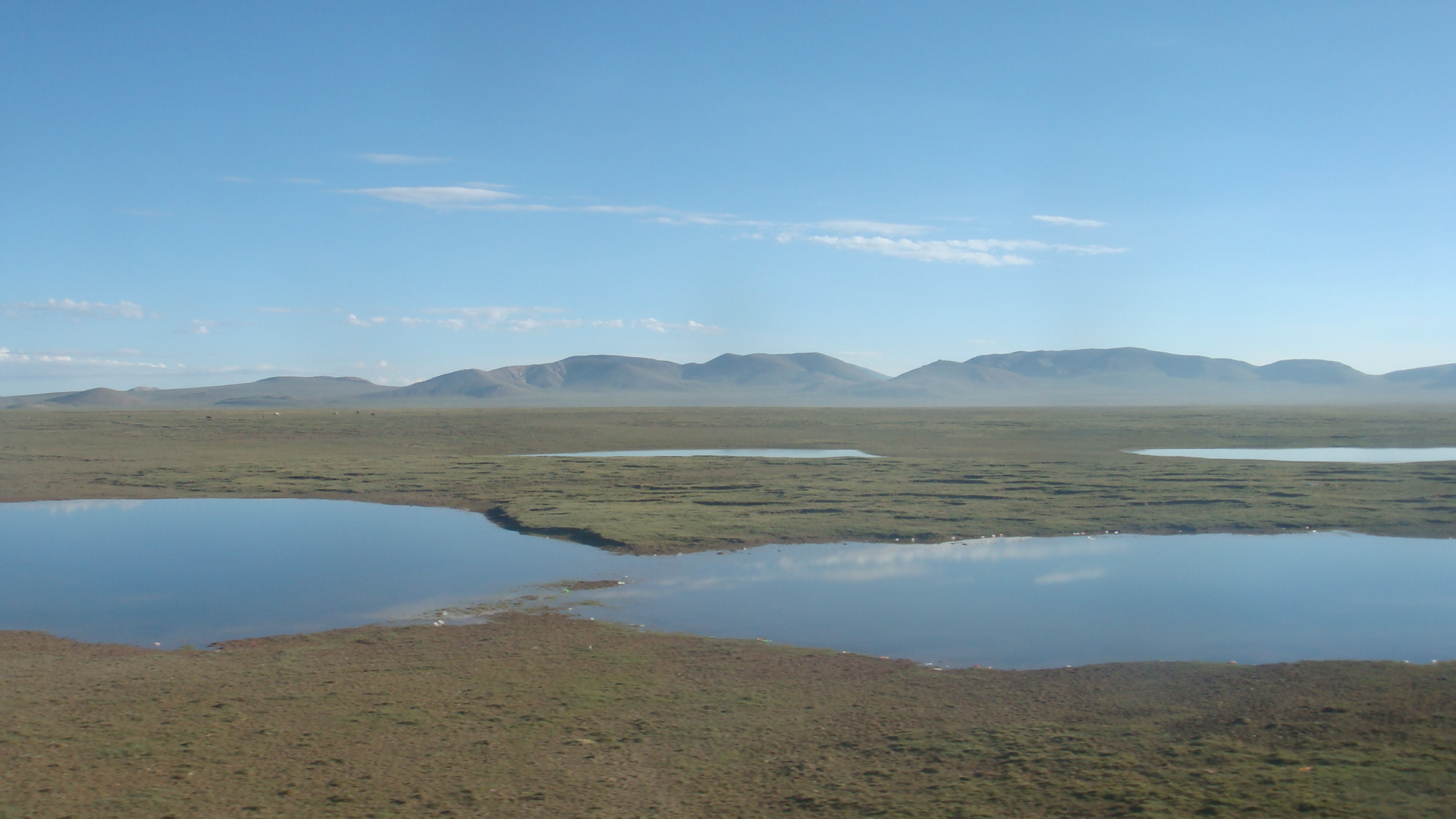
- Rural Nagqu

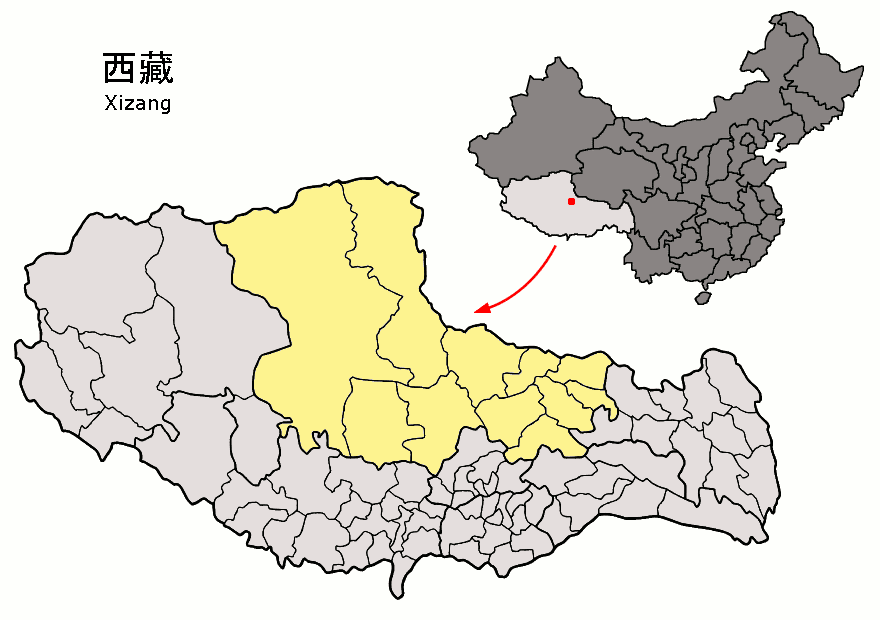
- Location of Nagqu City within China
- Coordinates (Nagqu municipal government): 31°28′34″N 92°03′04″E
- Country: China
- Autonomous region: Tibet
- County-level divisions: a district and 10 counties
- City seat: Seni District

Area
  - Total: 450,537 km^{2} (173,953 sq mi)

Population (2010)
  - Total: 462,381
  - Density: 1.02629/km^{2} (2.65808/sq mi)

GDP
  - Total: CN¥ 9.5 billion US$ 1.5 billion
  - Per capita: CN¥ 19,508; US$ 3,132
- Time zone: UTC+8 (China Standard)
- ISO 3166 code: CN-XZ-06
- Website: www.xznq.gov.cn

Nagqu

Chinese name
- Chinese: 那曲
- Hanyu Pinyin: Nàqū
Transcriptions
Standard Mandarin
- Hanyu Pinyin: Nàqū

Alternative Chinese name
- Chinese: 黑河
- Hanyu Pinyin: Hēihé
Transcriptions
Standard Mandarin
- Hanyu Pinyin: Hēihé

Tibetan name
- Tibetan: ནག་ཆུ།
Transcriptions
- Wylie: nag chu
- Tibetan Pinyin: Nagqu

Nagqu (also Naqu, Nakchu, or Nagchu; Tibetan: ནག་ཆུ།, Wylie: Nag-chu, ZWPY: Nagqu; Chinese: 那曲; lit. 'black river') is a prefecture-level city in the north of the Tibet Autonomous Region. On May 7, 2018, the former Nagqu Prefecture was officially declared the sixth prefecture-level city in Tibet after Lhasa, Shigatse, Chamdo, Nyingchi and Shannan. The regional area, covering an area of 450,537 km^{2} (173,953 sq mi), is bordered by Bayingolin and Hotan Prefectures of Xinjiang to the north, Haixi, Yushu Prefectures of Qinghai and Chamdo to the east, Nyingchi, Lhasa and Shigatse to the south, Ngari Prefecture to the west. As of the 2010 census, it had a population of 462,381. Since its official establishment in 2018, it is the largest prefecture-level city by area in the world, being slightly larger than Sweden. According to the population sampling survey, the resident population of the city by the end of 2024 will be 514,300.

Nagqu contains 89 townships, 25 towns, and 1,283 villages. The main city of Nagqu is along the China National Highway 109, 330 kilometres (210 mi) northeast of Lhasa. Amdo, Nyainrong and Xainza are other towns of note. Extremely rich in water resources, with 81% of Tibet's lakes, covering a total area of over 30,000 square kilometres (12,000 sq mi), it contains lakes such as Namtso, Siling Lake and rivers such as Dangqu.

Every August (the sixth month in the Tibetan calendar), Nagqu hosts the Kyagqen Horse Race, a major event locally attracting tens of thousands of herdsmen to participate in horseracing and archery contests.

== Etymology ==
Nagqu literally means "black river" in Tibetan and comes from the Nagqu River, which is the upper-main stream of the Salween River running through the area. The Chinese name for Nagqu was once Heihe (Chinese: 黑河), a direct translation of the Tibetan name's literal meaning. During the Ming and Qing dynasties, it was known as Hala Wusu, a transliteration of "black river" in Mongolian. In modern times, Nagqu (the area around Nagqu Town) is called Wu'erguxiong (吾尔古雄) or Seruxiangba (色如襄巴).

== History ==
Nagqu appeared clearly in the earliest historical materials; it was part of the ancient Zhangzhung and it was called Yangtong (羊同) in Chinese historical records. In Tibetan historical records, the place was called "Zhuodai" (卓岱), meaning "nomadic tribe", and the inhabitants here were called "Zhuoba" (卓巴), meaning "nomads"; or "Qiangba" (羌巴), meaning "northerner"; or "Changri", it means the northern tribe. In the era of the ascendancy of Zhangzhung, as its inhabitants divided their territory into the inner, outer and middle three parts. The modern Nagqu roughly is the territories of middle Zhangzhung and outer Zhangzhung. The dzong architecture of Dangnuoqiong was the center of middle Zhangzhung, it was located round the lake of Tangra Yumco in the southwest of Nagqu. As the Zhangzhung Regime was weakened, its territory shrank to the west.

The earliest mosque was built in the 14th century. During the Song dynasty, Nagqu was called one of the Four Northern Tribes (北方四部落). In 1269, the Mongolian soldiers began to garrison in the northern Tibet, and later the "39 Tribes of Hor" (Standard Tibetan: ཧོར, romanized: hor, Chinese: 霍尔) formed Mongolian forces in northern Tibet. In 1731, the Qing Government placed the territory of 39 Tribes under the direct jurisdiction of the Amban.

In 1751, Kanxiang Dzong (坎襄宗) in Nagqu was formed to the direct rule of the Kashag Government, and part of the area was under the jurisdiction of Panchen. Around the Xinhai Revolution, the government of the Kashag Government relegated the region of 39 Tribes to its rule and forcibly took over the Panchen Lama. In 1916, the "Hor Director" (霍尔总管) was established. In 1942, the prefecture of Changchub Chikyab (Standard Tibetan: བྱང་ཆུབ་སྤྱི་ཁྱབ་, romanized: byang chub spyi khyab, Chinese: 绛曲基巧) was formed.

In 1951, the seat of Changchub Chikyab Prefecture was Nagqu (Heihe) Town, the prefecture administered the pasture land to the northern Lhasa and 6 dzongs in Heihe area, the Conference Hall of Panchen Chamber (班禅堪布会议厅) administered Damusajia Dzong (达木萨迦宗). The prefecture of Changchub Chikyab had jurisdiction over 14 dzongs in 1954.

The Preparatory Committee of Tibet Autonomous Region set up Chikyab Office (基巧办事处) in Nagqu in October 1956, The prefecture of Changchub Chikyab was renamed to Heihe in 1959, the prefecture of Heihe was renamed to Nagqu in January 1960, its seat was Heihe County (modern Seni District).

The former Nagqu Prefecture was approved for prefecture-level city status on October 2, 2017, by the State Council, and it was officially established on May 7, 2018.

== Geography ==
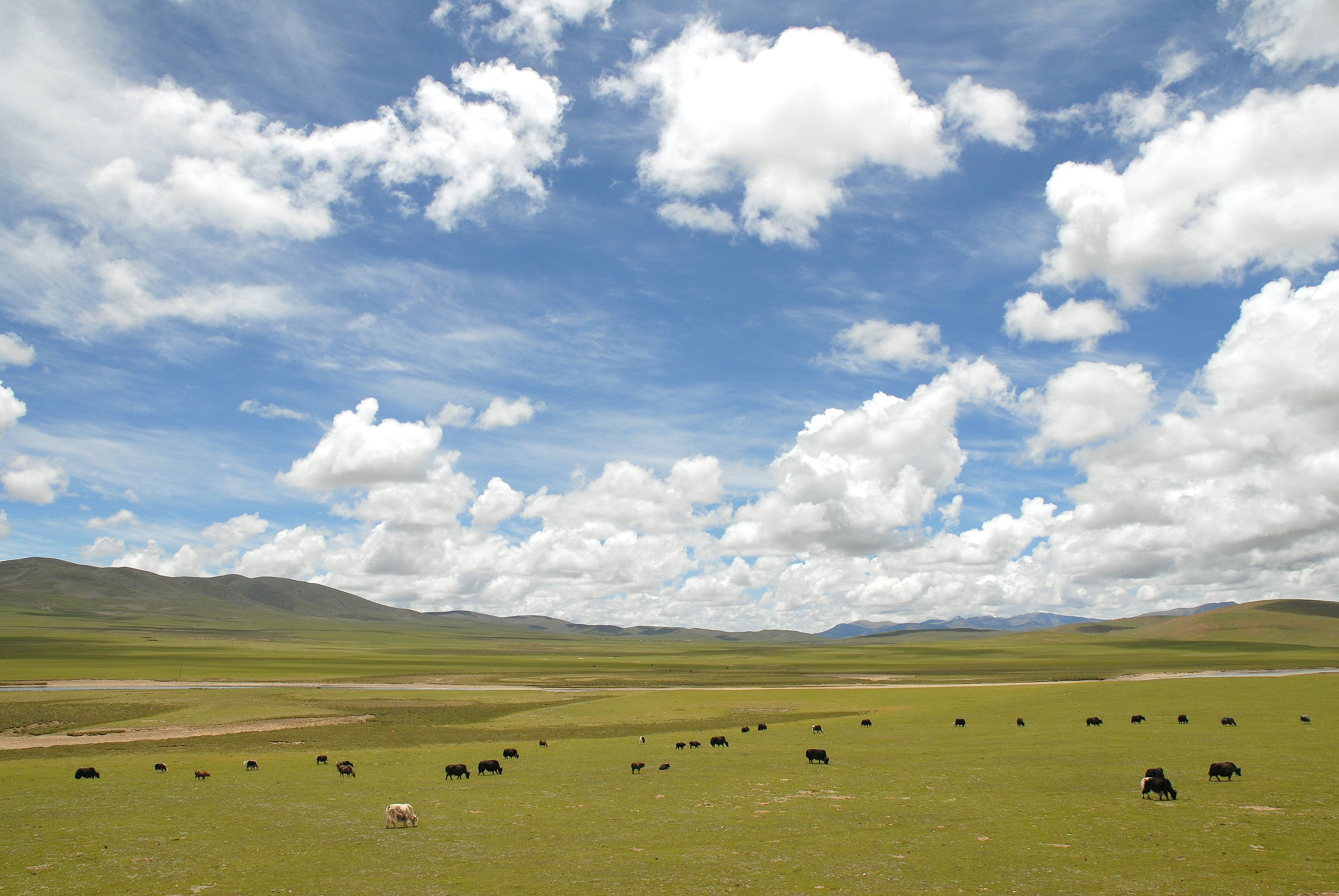
Rural Nagqu

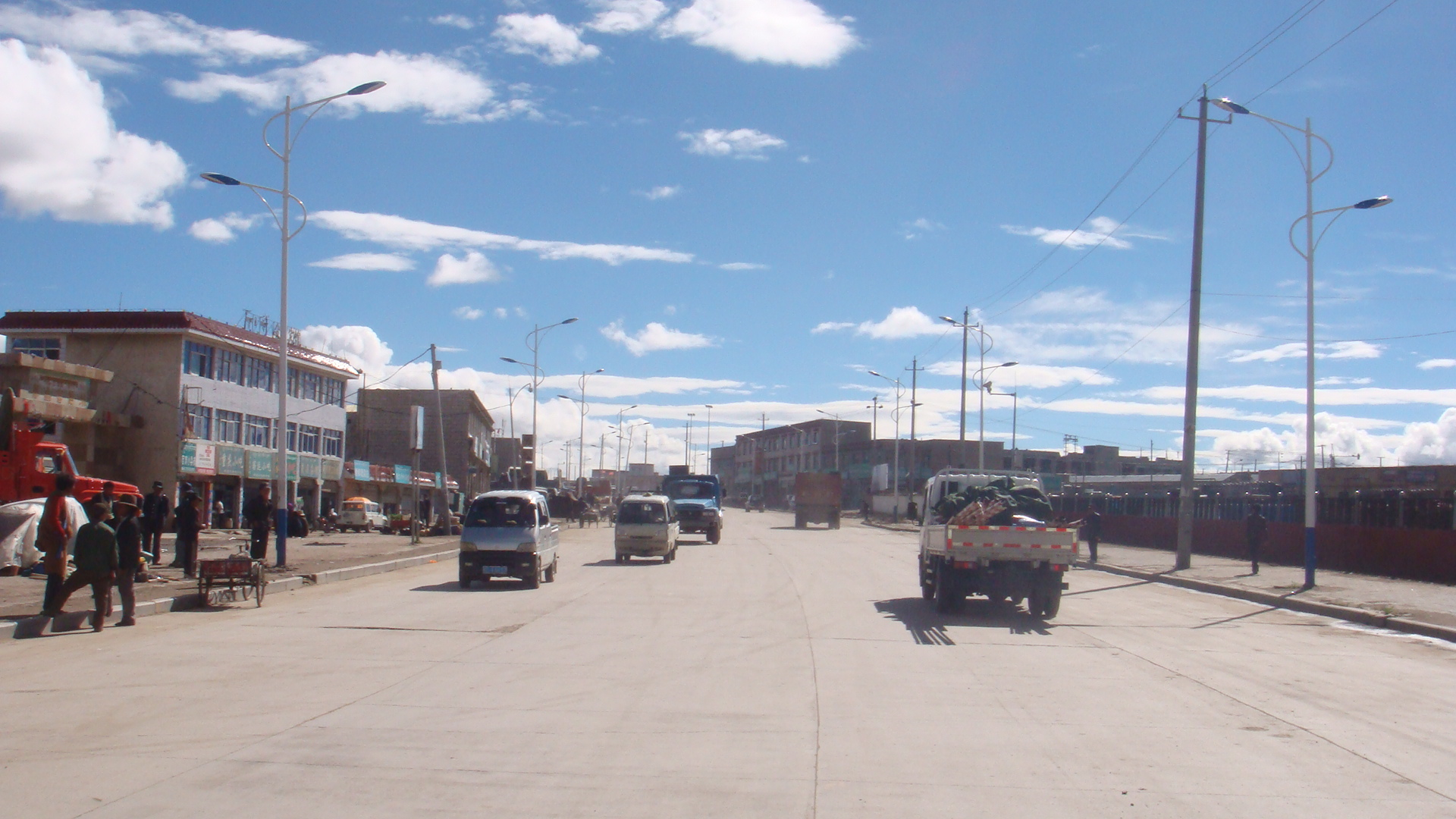
Nagqu Town

Nagqu is located in the northeast of Tibet. Nagqu Town is 330 kilometres (210 mi) by the China National Highway 109 northeast of Lhasa. Nagqu is bordered by Bayingolin and Hotan Prefectures of Xinjiang to the north, Haixi, Yushu Prefectures of Qinghai and Chamdo to the east, Nyingchi, Lhasa and Shigatse to the south, and Ngari Prefecture to the west. It covers an area of 450,537 km^{2} (173,953 sq mi).) It lies on the southern slope of Tanggula Mountains, on the north side of Nyenchen Tanglha Mountains, and on the eastern end of the Changtang Plateau. The average altitude is more than 4,500 meters (14,800 ft) above sea level. Principal towns in the region include Nagqu Town, Amdo, Nyainrong and Xainza.

Nagqu is extremely rich in water resources, with a total surface water resources of about 54 cubic kilometres (13 cu mi), groundwater resources of about 25.1 cubic kilometres (6.0 cu mi) and a further 8.8 cubic kilometres (2.1 cu mi) in glacial ice storage. The region contains 81% of Tibet's lakes, covering a total area of over 30,000 square kilometres (12,000 sq mi). There are 11 lakes with an area of over 100 square kilometres (39 sq mi) and 121 lakes with an area of more than 5 square kilometres (1.9 sq mi). Notable lakes include Namtso, spanning Nagqu's Baingoin County and neighboring Lhasa prefecture-level city's Damxung County with a surface area of 1,920 km^{2} (740 sq mi), and Siling Lake (Qilin) spanning Baingoin and Xainza counties, which at 1,865 square kilometres (720 sq mi) is the second largest saltwater lake in the northern Tibetan Plateau. Dorsoidong Co and Chibzhang Co, over 300 kilometres (190 mi) northwest of Nagqu Town covered a lake area of 1,012 square kilometres (391 sq mi) as of 2018. The principal rivers of Nagqu are the Dangqu, Zhajia Zangbo, Jiagang Zangbu, Suoqu, Xiaqu, Benqu, Ba Qingqu, and Yiqu with hundreds more throughout the region. Purugangri Glacier is located about 560 kilometres (350 mi) from Nagqu town within Qiangtang Nature Reserve, at 6,000 to 6,800 metres above sea level. Covering an area of 423 square kilometres (163 sq mi), it has been confirmed to be the world's third largest.

=== Climate ===
Nagqu is a natural disaster-prone region, being affected by monsoon climate, plate geology movements, plus complex terrain and other disaster-causing factors. The annual average temperature is −2.1 °C (28.2 °F), while the coldest temperatures can reach −40 °C (−40 °F). Overall it classifies as a dry-winter subalpine climate (Dwc) bordering on a cool semi-arid climate (BSk), with comfortable, humid summers and long, frigid, dry, windy winters. The differences between day and night are severe. It is not uncommon to have nights with temperatures below freezing after days with temperatures of 25 °C (77 °F) or days with temperatures above freezing in winter after night temperatures of −25 °C (−13 °F). Annual sunshine totals more than 2,886 hours. Nagqu town had an average annual rainfall of 477.1 mm (18.78 in) between 1956 and 2010. The southeastern part of the prefecture is wetter, with annual precipitation exceeding 580 mm (23 in). while the northwestern part is driest with an average annual precipitation below 440 mm (17 in). The effects of global warming increasingly pose a problem in the region, with record highs in 2019.

Climate data for Nagqu (Seni District), elevation 4,507 m (14,787 ft), (1991–2020 normals, extremes 1954–present)
Month	Jan	Feb	Mar	Apr	May	Jun	Jul	Aug	Sep	Oct	Nov	Dec	Year
Record high °C (°F)	11.0 (51.8)	12.3 (54.1)	16.1 (61.0)	19.4 (66.9)	21.3 (70.3)	24.2 (75.6)	24.1 (75.4)	22.0 (71.6)	22.2 (72.0)	18.1 (64.6)	12.8 (55.0)	11.8 (53.2)	24.2 (75.6)
Mean daily maximum °C (°F)	−2.4 (27.7)	−0.1 (31.8)	3.4 (38.1)	7.4 (45.3)	11.5 (52.7)	15.3 (59.5)	16.3 (61.3)	16.2 (61.2)	13.8 (56.8)	8.3 (46.9)	2.7 (36.9)	−0.4 (31.3)	7.7 (45.8)
Daily mean °C (°F)	−11.3 (11.7)	−8.5 (16.7)	−4.5 (23.9)	−0.2 (31.6)	4.2 (39.6)	8.4 (47.1)	10.0 (50.0)	9.5 (49.1)	6.7 (44.1)	0.8 (33.4)	−6.0 (21.2)	−9.9 (14.2)	−0.1 (31.9)
Mean daily minimum °C (°F)	−19.1 (−2.4)	−16.3 (2.7)	−11.9 (10.6)	−7.1 (19.2)	−2.0 (28.4)	2.9 (37.2)	5.0 (41.0)	4.6 (40.3)	1.7 (35.1)	−4.9 (23.2)	−12.7 (9.1)	−17.8 (0.0)	−6.5 (20.4)
Record low °C (°F)	−41.2 (−42.2)	−34.5 (−30.1)	−27.3 (−17.1)	−22.1 (−7.8)	−15.9 (3.4)	−8.8 (16.2)	−6.8 (19.8)	−6.1 (21.0)	−12.4 (9.7)	−23.6 (−10.5)	−31.7 (−25.1)	−35.3 (−31.5)	−41.2 (−42.2)
Average precipitation mm (inches)	5.2 (0.20)	3.2 (0.13)	7.5 (0.30)	11.9 (0.47)	40.9 (1.61)	90.2 (3.55)	111.0 (4.37)	100.9 (3.97)	71.7 (2.82)	22.0 (0.87)	3.5 (0.14)	2.0 (0.08)	470 (18.51)
Average precipitation days (≥ 0.1 mm)	4.2	3.4	4.8	7.2	14.9	20.6	20.9	19.9	18.8	8.1	3.1	1.9	127.8
Average snowy days	5.9	6.4	8.6	12.6	18.8	6.7	0.3	0.7	6.1	11.8	5.1	3.7	86.7
Average relative humidity (%)	41	36	37	45	55	63	67	67	68	56	47	40	52
Mean monthly sunshine hours	213.7	198.7	222.6	221.0	238.0	216.6	208.0	205.5	209.5	243.6	240.4	232.9	2,650.5
Percentage possible sunshine	66	63	59	57	56	51	48	51	57	70	77	75	61
Source 1: China Meteorological Administration
Source 2: Weather China extremes

== Administrative divisions ==
The Naqu City People's Government administrative headquarters is located at No. 3, Zhejiang West Road in the main town. It has 89 townships, 25 towns, and 1283 villages under its jurisdiction.

Map
Name	Simplified Chinese	Hanyu Pinyin	Tibetan	Wylie	Population (2010 census)	Area (km^{2})	Density (/km^{2})
Seni District	色尼区	Sèní Qū	གསེར་རྙེད་ཆུས།	gser rnyed chus	108,781	16,195	6.71
Lhari County	嘉黎县	Jiālí Xiàn	ལྷ་རི་རྫོང་།	lha ri rdzong	32,356	13,056	2.47
Biru County	比如县	Bǐrú Xiàn	འབྲི་རུ་རྫོང་།	'bri ru rdzong	60,179	11,680	5.15
Nyainrong County	聂荣县	Nièróng Xiàn	གཉན་རོང་རྫོང་།	gnyan rong rdzong	32,376	9,017	3.59
Amdo County	安多县	Ānduō Xiàn	ཨ་མདོ་རྫོང་།	a mdo rdzong	37,802	43,411	0.87
Xainza County	申扎县	Shēnzhā Xiàn	ཤན་རྩ་རྫོང་།	shan rtsa rdzong	20,285	25,546	0.79
Sog County	索县	Suǒ Xiàn	སོག་རྫོང་།	sog rdzong	43,621	5,744	7.59
Baingoin County	班戈县	Bāngē Xiàn	དཔལ་མགོན་རྫོང་།	dpal mgon rdzong	36,842	28,383	1.29
Baqên County	巴青县	Bāqīng Xiàn	སྦྲ་ཆེན་རྫོང་།	sbra chen rdzong	48,284	10,326	4.67
Nyima County	尼玛县	Nímǎ Xiàn	ཉི་མ་རྫོང་།	nyi ma rdzong	29,856	72,499	0.41
Shuanghu County	双湖县	Shuānghú Xiàn	མཚོ་གཉིས་་རྫོང་།	mtsho gnyis rdzong	11,999	116,637	0.10

== Economy ==
By 2009, 55 different minerals had been discovered in the region, with the largest mineral reserves being iron, chromium, gold, antimony, lead, zinc, copper, boron, lithium, rock salt and gypsum. There are significant reserves of oil, natural gas, oil shale and others, though Nagqu had long been severely backwards in energy production and usage to the point that at one stage only Nagqu Town had a 2 MW diesel power plant. Geothermal energy production began investigation in 1984. Nagqu geothermal field lies 2.5 kilometres (1.6 mi) away from Nagqu Town, and covers an area of 4.5 kilometres (2.8 mi). Jiagang Hydropower Station in Xainza County was built in the 1990s and as of 2008 serves about 20,000 nomadic households across the county. In June 2019, Jinqiao Hydropower Station, the first hydropower station to be built with a rock-fill concrete gravity dam in Tibet, was inaugurated in Lhari County, serving some 30,000 local farmers and herdsmen in an area previously without electricity. The station and dam reportedly cost 1.4 billion yuan (about 202.7 million U.S. dollars) and has an annual power generation capacity of 357 million kilowatt-hours.

With Nagqu being one of China's five biggest pastures, and possibly the highest in the world at 4,500 metres (14,800 ft) above sea level, most counties rely on animal husbandry, and few counties are semi-agricultural and semi-animal husbandry areas. As of 2017, the regional GDP in Nagqu was 11,982 million yuan (1,775 million US dollars), completed fixed assets investment 18,549 million yuan (2,747 million US dollars), urban and rural residents per capita disposable income reached 31,252 yuan (4,629 US dollars), 9,792 yuan (1,450 US dollars), total retail sales of social consumer goods 2,127 million yuan (315 million US dollars), tax revenue exceeded 1,000 million yuan (148 million US dollars). Agriculture and animal husbandry accounted for 1.923 billion yuan. By 2015, the manufacturing industry was expected to be valued at 1.852 billion yuan, an increase of 23.4%. Production of medicines and Tibetan carpets have significantly increased in recent times. As of 2015 there were 5 scientific research institutions and 11 agricultural and animal husbandry science and technology-related institutions, employing 5,856 professional and technical personnel.

== Culture ==
Nagqu contains a number of Tibetan Buddhist monasteries. Shodain Monastery (also known as "Shodain Yarba" or "Shadain"), with around 350 lamas, is one of the most significant, and is governed by Sera Monastery in Lhasa. The monastery was established in 1884 and originally belonged to the Nyingma sect before the Geru sect. The 13th Dalai Lama lived at the monastery for over a month in 1908 during his return journey from Beijing. He inaugurated the Grand Summons Ceremony to be held annually on January 4 in the Tibetan calendar. The Changmo dance, also known as Je Changmo or Jusong Changmo Qin (Changmo means dance or hop, is common practice at Shodain during August. The middle roof of the monastery contains a golden law wheel surrounded by two golden sheep, alikened to that of Jokhang Monastery in Lhasa. Tsanden Monastery (also Zanden or Sanden) in Sog County was built in 1668 under the orders of Drepung Monastery. It covers an area of 25,975 square meters and with its white palace and red palace resembles the Potala Palace from a distance. The monastery contains numerous statues of Buddhas, murals, scriptures and works of art. Badan Bonner temple, founded by Shichong Garmahan is in the village of Sechang Village in Sog County, and contains an oratory and traditional Tibetan bleaching room. Zhajun Monastery in the southeast of Baingoin County contains a scripture hall, Buddha hall and Sengshe and is dedicated primarily to Shakyamuni.

Every August (June in the Tibetan calendar), Nagqu hosts the Kyagqen Horse Race, a major event locally, attracting tens of thousands of herdsmen who arrive in Nagqu on their horses and with goods. They set up camp in tents in the southern part of the main town and participate in horse racing, horsemanship and archery contests on August 10. Hats, mostly made from lamb skins and artificial leather and an "antenna-like stripe of fabric at the top" are worn by women during the festival.

In Baingoin County, the Qiduo Cave Paintings are significant, with one cave containing over 200 images of animals, characters and symbols.

== Wildlife ==
Nagqu contains a high biodiversity of wildlife. There are wild goats, stone sheep, kiangs, Tibetan blue bears, Tibetan foxes, Himalayan wolves, scorpions, and birds such as Tibetan finch, brown-backed crow, pheasant, vulture, wild ducks, swans, black-necked cranes, and red-crowned cranes. As of 2018 seven wildlife sanctuaries have been established in Nagqu. The 400,000 hectare Siling Co National Nature Reserve (also Selincuo Reserve or Xainza Nature Reserve) around Siling Lake was established in 1993 and contains significant populations of black-necked cranes and some 120 species of birds in total. The Yalong Scenic Area, covering an area of 1,580 square kilometres (610 sq mi) was established in 1988 and is located in the middle reaches of the Yarlung Zangbo River in the vicinity of Zedang Town.

Fritillaria grow on alpine bushes and alpine meadows at an altitude of 4000–5000 meters, and is valued in Chinese herbal medicine for its ability to loosen mucus on the lungs and cure pulmonary-related ailments. Cordyceps sinensis is also valued for its effect on the lungs and kidneys, and is eaten as a delicacy in soups in restaurants in countries such as Singapore. Snow Lotus and Musk, known for its central nervous system stimulating effect, are also grown. Due to the region being too cold for trees to grow, the Chinese government are considering using solar power to introduce new forested areas to Nagqu, though it is not believed to be economically sustainable.

== Transport ==
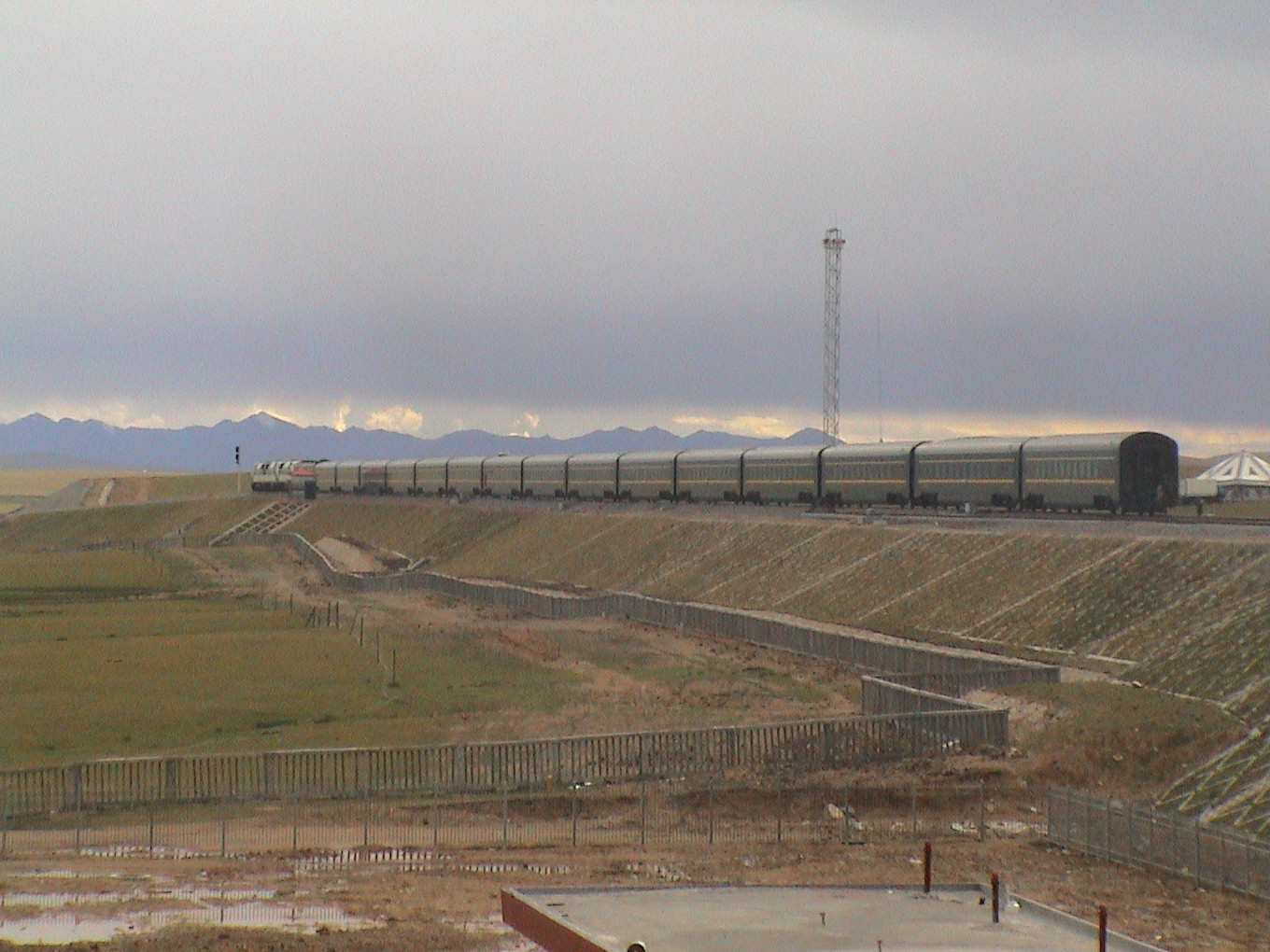
The Qinghai–Tibet railway in Nagqu

In 2015, 129 transportation projects were constructed, with a projected investment of 6.29 billion yuan, though only 2.422 billion yuan was completed. Nagqu Dagring Airport will be the world's highest altitude airport once constructed at 4,436 m (14,554 ft) above sea level. Main lines of communication includes the Qinghai-Tibet Railway, the G 109 National Highway, the Nagqu–Chamdo (那曲-昌都公路), and the Nagqu–Shiquanhe (那曲-狮泉河公路) highways.

== Notable people ==
- Jamyang Sherab (加央西热, 1957–2004), member of the Chinese Communist Party, deputy secretary of the Nagqu Culture Bureau, and secretary general and executive vice chairman of the Tibet Autonomous Region. A member of the Sixth National Committee of the Chinese Writers Association, he published poetry and several novels, one of which won the 1994 Tibetan Literature newcomer's award.
- Shabdrung Rinpoche (1997–present in Lhari County), Buddhist monk, recognized as the reincarnation of the 22nd Shabdrung Living Buddha. In 2011 he opened the Tibet College of Buddhism in Lhasa.
- Tsewang Norbu
