= Chang Tang Nature Reserve =

Nature reserve in Tibet, China

Chang Tang National Nature Reserve
- Interactive map of Chang Tang National Nature Reserve
- Location: China: Amdo County, Nagqu Prefecture; Nyima County, Nagqu Prefecture; Shuanghu County, Nagqu Prefecture; Rutog County, Ngari Prefecture; Gêrzê County, Ngari Prefecture; Gê'gyai County, Ngari Prefecture
- Coordinates: 34°N 88°E
- Area: 334,000 km^{2} (128,958 mi^{2})
- Established: 1993

Chang Tang National Nature Reserve (Chinese: 羌塘国家级自然保护区) lies in the northern Tibetan Plateau. It is the third-largest land nature reserve in the world, after the Northeast Greenland National Park and Kavango-Zambezi Transfrontier Conservation Area, with an area of over 334,000 km^{2} (129,000 mi^{2}), making it bigger than 183 countries. Administratively, it lies in Nagqu and Ngari prefectures. With the more recently established adjoining reserves listed below there is now a total of 496,000 km^{2} (191,507 sq. miles) of connected Nature Reserves, which represents an area almost as large as Spain and bigger than 197 other countries.

== History ==
With assistance from the internationally renowned animal behaviourist and naturalist, George Schaller, the Chang Tang Nature Reserve was originally established by the government of Tibet Autonomous Region in 1993 to protect its fragile ecosystem. The reserve spans the vast and sparsely inhabited northern Tibetan Changtang plateau. The reserve had since been expanded over time. It was upgraded to a "National Protected Area" in April 2000 by the Chinese Government. It is currently listed as an IUCN Category: VI - Managed Resource Protected Area.

== Geography ==
The Changtang (Tibetan for "Northern plain") is a massive high-altitude plateau stretching from Ladakh in India, across northern Tibet into Qinghai Province, and north into the Nanshan mountains of Xinjiang Province. The Chang Tang Nature Reserve includes most of the Chinese portion of the plateau.

As the highest nature reserve in the world, the Chang Tang has an average altitude over 4,800 metres (16,000 feet) with "high rolling hills, and plains interspersed by mountains over 20,000 feet [6,000 metres] high." It is extremely cold in winter with temperatures dropping to minus 40 degrees at night. Travel is easier in the winter because summer can be very wet and vehicles get bogged easily.

New reserves bordering the Chang Tang Nature Reserve have been added in recent years:

- The "Mid-Kunlun Reserve" is directly to the north of the Changtang Nature Reserve. It 32,000 km^{2}. and was established in 2001. It also borders the "Arjin Shan (or "Altun Tagh") Reserve" on its east.
- The "Xianza Reserve" Nature Reserve in the Tibet Autonomous Region is 40,000 km^{2}, and is directly to the south of the Chang Tang Nature Reserve. It was established in 1993 and contains the Siling Lake.
- The "Arjin Shan (or "Altun Tagh") Reserve," 45,000 sq. km in the Xinjiang Autonomous Region, was established in 1983, is to the northeast of the Chang Tang Nature Reserve.
- The "Kekexili (aka "Kokoxili" or "Hoh Xil") National Reserve" in Qinghai Province, is 45,000 km^{2}, and was established in 1995. It borders the "Mid-Kunlun Reserve" to the south (and is to the east of the Chang Tang Nature Reserve).

In addition, there are two more proposed reserves on the borders of the Chang Tang Nature Reserve: to the south of the Kekexili Reserve, and to the west of the Mid-Kunlun Reserve. If these proposed new reserves are established, the vast majority of the range of the Chiru, and almost all the spring migration routes of the female Chiru will be protected.

== Population ==
It is home to only a few Tibetan nomads and various park staff hired to prevent poaching.

== Flora and fauna ==
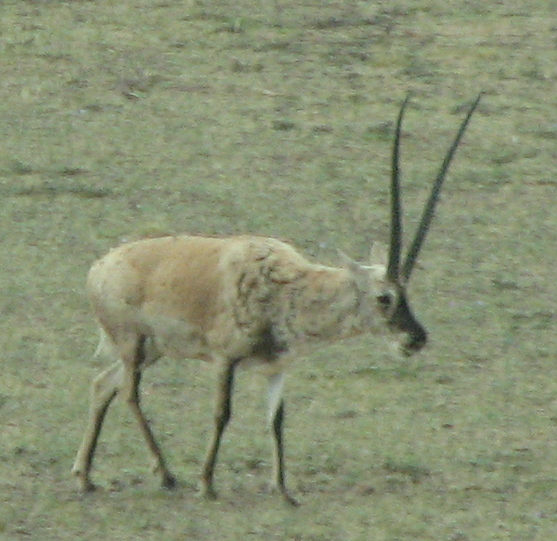
Tibetan antelope or Chiru (Pantholops hodgsonii) on the Changtang plateau

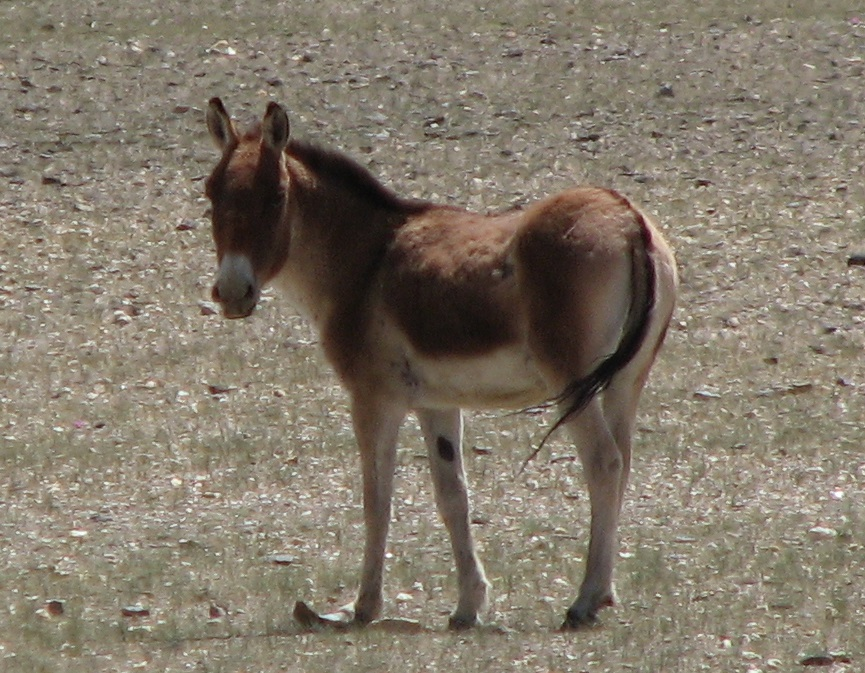
Kiang (Tibetan wild ass) on the Chang Tang plateau

Here are some of the last remaining herds of wild ungulates: Wild yak (Bos mutus), Tibetan wild ass or kiang (Equus kiang), Himalayan blue sheep or Bharal (Pseudois nayaur), Argali (Ovis ammon), Tibetan gazelle (Procapra picticaudata) and Tibetan antelope or chiru (Pantholops hodgsonii). Chiru wool is considered the finest known, and is smuggled, especially to Kashmir, India where it is woven into shahtoosh shawls. Predators include snow leopards (Panthera uncia or Uncia uncia), Tibetan wolves (Canis lupus filchneri), Turkestan lynx (Lynx lynx isabellinus) and Tibetan blue bears (Ursus arctos pruinosus). At the bottom end of the food chain are large numbers of pika (Ochotona spp.).

The vegetation is open shrubland and grasslands mainly dominated by Stipa grasses and Kobresia species ("bog sedges").

== See also ==
- Protected areas of China
