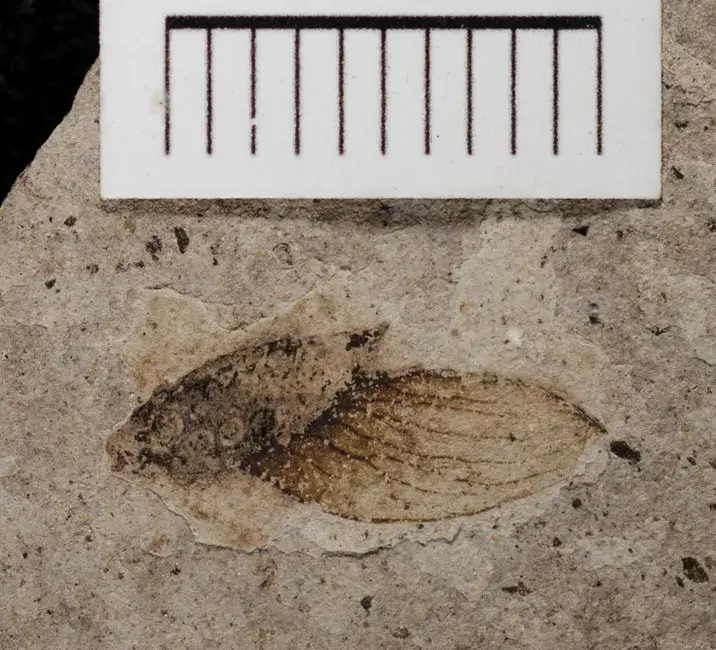
- Cedrelospermum nervosum

Scientific classification
- Kingdom: Plantae
- Clade: Tracheophytes
- Clade: Angiosperms
- Clade: Eudicots
- Clade: Rosids
- Order: Rosales
- Family: Ulmaceae
- Genus: †Cedrelospermum; G.Saporta, 1889

= Cedrelospermum =

Cedrelospermum Temporal range: Eocene–Oligocene

Extinct species of flowering plant

Cedrelospermum is an extinct genus of plants in the family Ulmaceae. Its fossils have been found in the early Eocene to early Oligocene strata in North America, in the middle Eocene to middle Miocene strata in Europe, and in the middle Eocene of Bangor in Tibet, the late Eocene of Nyima, the late Oligocene of Shuanghu, and the late Eocene of Maguan in Yunnan in Asia.

The fruits of the genus Cedrelospermum are oval to triangular, with a membranous wing on one side. Some species have only one wing; others have two separate wings, a primary wing and a secondary wing.

== Species ==
The following Cedrelospermum species have been described:

- †Cedrelospermum aquense Saporta, 1889
- †Cedrelospermum asiaticum Jia et al., 2015
- †Cedrelospermum leptospermum Manchester, 1987
- †Cedrelospermum lineatum (Lesq.) Manchester, 1987
- †Cedrelospermum manchesteri Magall.-Puebla, Cev.-Ferriz, 1994
- †Cedrelospermum nervosum Newberry, 1883
- †Cedrelospermum stiriacum (Ettingsh.) Kovar-Eder, Z. Kvaček, 2004
- †Cedrelospermum tibeticum LB Jia, T. Su & ZK Zhou, 2019
