= Changtang =

Subregion of the Tibetan Plateau

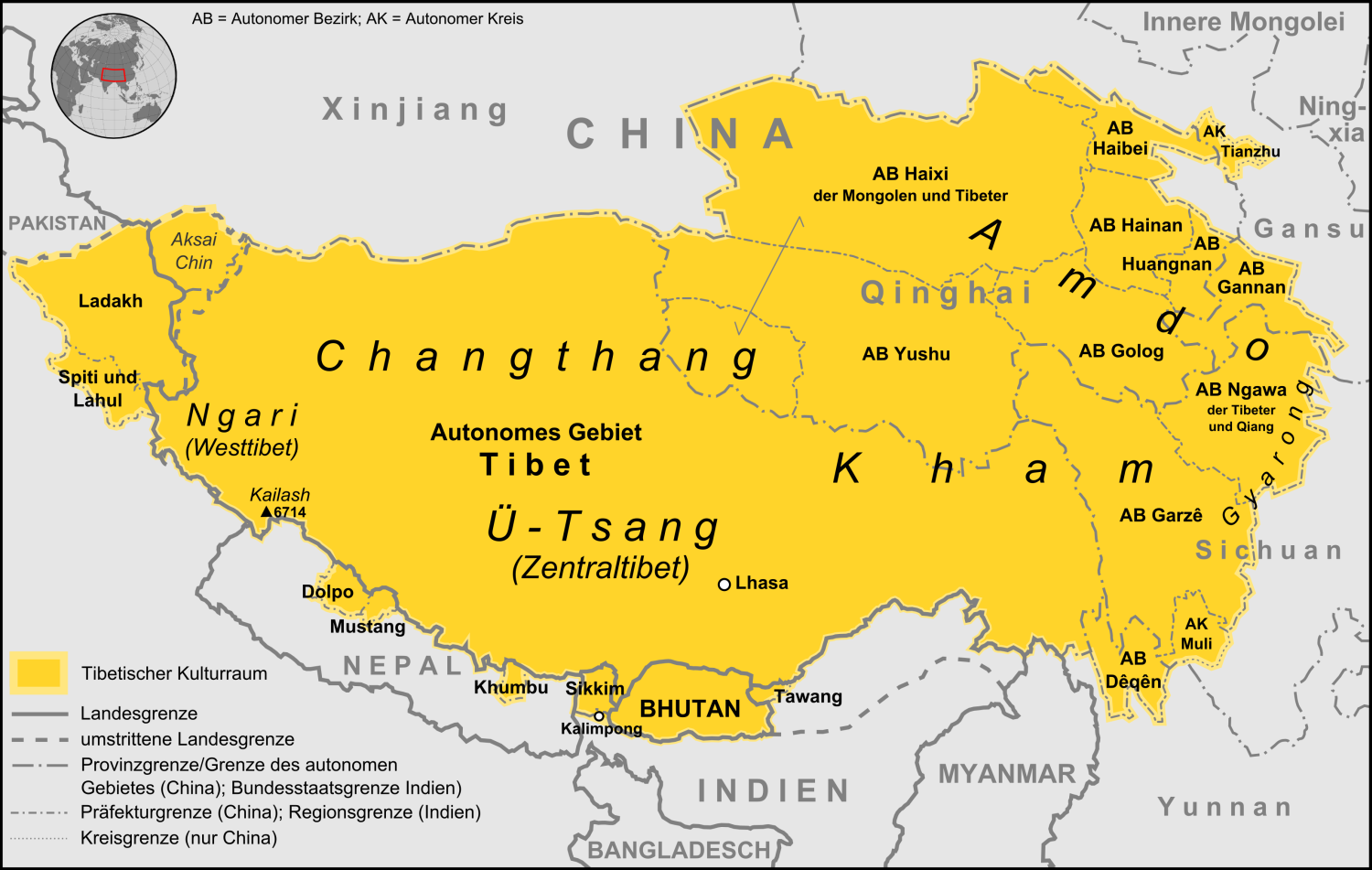
- Changtang within the Tibetan cultural sphere

Chinese name
- Chinese: 羌塘
Transcriptions
Standard Mandarin
- Hanyu Pinyin: Qiāngtáng
- Wade–Giles: Chi'ang^{1}-t'ang^{2}

Alternative Chinese name
- Chinese: 藏北高原
- Literal meaning: North Tibet plateau
Transcriptions
Standard Mandarin
- Hanyu Pinyin: Zàng Běi Gāoyuán
- Wade–Giles: Tsang^{4} Pei^{3} Kao^{1}-yüan^{4}

Tibetan name
- Tibetan: བྱང་ཐང་།
Transcriptions
- Wylie: byang thang
- Tibetan Pinyin: Qangtang

Changtang (alternatively spelled Changthang or Qangtang), also known as the Northern Tibetan Plateau, is a part of the high altitude Tibetan Plateau with highlands and lakes. It extends from western and northern Tibet into the southern edges of Xinjiang as well as Changthang district in southeastern Ladakh of India. From eastern Ladakh, Changtang stretches approximately 1,600 kilometres (990 mi) east into Tibet as far as Qinghai. The Changtang region is home to the Changpa, a nomadic Tibetan people.

== Geography ==
=== Physical geography ===
Satellite picture of Changtang

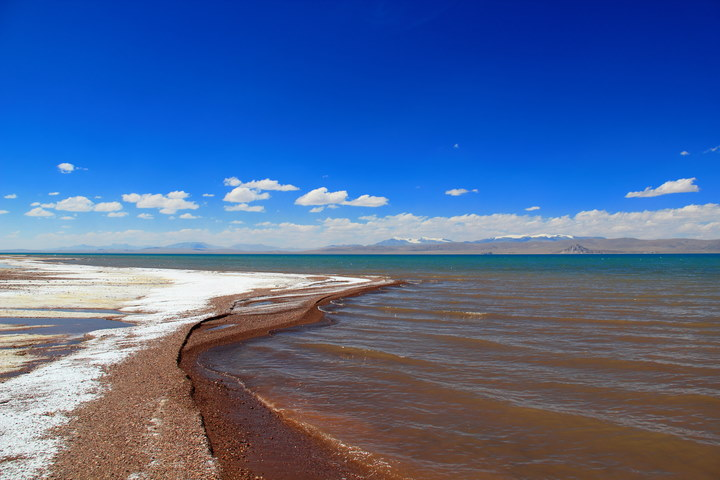
Dagze Lake in Shuanghu County

Changtang, meaning "northern [high] plain" in Tibetan, is a mostly endorheic region in the northern part of the Tibetan Plateau. The region is enclosed by the Kunlun Mountains, the Karakoram Mountains, the Transhimalayas, and the Tanggula Mountains, with a total area of about 700,000 km^{2} (270,000 sq mi) and an average elevation of over 4,500 m (14,800 ft). The region consists of many basins containing lakes or lacustrine plains separated by mountains and hills. The surface is mainly made up of sedimentary rocks from the Paleozoic and the Mesozoic. Changtang is also home to the most extensive permafrost among mid- and low-latitude regions of the northern hemisphere.

=== Climate ===
The climate of Changtang is cold and arid. The summers are warm but short, and thunderstorms can occur at any time of year, often accompanied with hail. Meanwhile, the winters are cold and Arctic-like despite the latitude, primarily due to the high elevation. In northern Changtang, the daily minimum temperature is almost always below 0 °C (32 °F), and the mean temperature of July, the warmest month, is below 6 °C (43 °F). Annual precipitation is around 100 mm (3.9 in), mainly in the form of snow, graupel and hail. In southern Changtang, the mean temperature of the warmest month is 6–10 °C (43–50 °F) and annual precipitation is 100–300 mm (3.9–11.8 in). The mean temperature of January, the coldest month, ranges between −20 °C (−4 °F) and −15 °C (5 °F), reaching as low as −25 °C (−13 °F) in some places. The western part of Changtang receives very little precipitation but is warmer than the rest of the plateau. As a result, it is home to the highest snow line of the northern hemisphere at 6,200 m (20,300 ft).

== History ==
Traces of human activity dating to 40,000–30,000 years ago have been discovered in Changtang. Neolithic rock paintings dating to 4,000 to 10,000 years ago discovered in Rongma, Nyima County depict humans, domestic animals, as well as scenes of hunting and animal husbandry. The high density of archaeological findings in areas that are inhospitable today indicates that Changtang may have hosted a flourishing civilization in the past.

Recorded history in Changtang began with the Zhangzhung Kingdom. Changtang was part of Outer Zhangzhung and Middle Zhangzhung, two of the three divisions of the polity. Dangs-ra khyung-rdzong, an important center of the state, was located on the shore of the Lake Tangra Yumco, in southwestern Changtang. Zhangzhung culture was represented by many rock paintings found in Rutog County, which depict Bön sacrifices, shamanic activities, trade caravans, and hunting or grazing scenes. Tibetan records called the inhabitants of the region Drokpa ("nomads"), or Changpa ("northerners"). The Sumpa people took over eastern Changtang in the 7th century. Changtang was subsequently ruled by the Tibetan Empire, and after its fall, part of the plateau was controlled by the Guge Kingdom.

Traditionally, the northern limit of grazing lay between 33° N and 34° N. The core of Changtang to the north was considered no man's land outside of the Tibetan government's control, only visited by salt miners, bandits (both Tibetans and Kazakhs) and a small number of hunters. Changtang historically provided much of the salt consumed in Central Tibet. Salt was mined from Changtang's many salt lakes by miners, most of whom young men from Xainza and Baingoin, and carried to Lhasa and Shigatse on the backs of sheep. This form of transportation existed for more than a thousand years until it was replaced in the 1990s by vehicles.

=== Settlement of Nyima and Shuanghu ===
Formerly uninhabited land, Nyima and Shuanghu in the center of Changtang were only settled in the 1970s. At the time, Xainza County in southern Changtang started to be affected by overgrazing. In 1971, Lobsang Tenzin (洛桑丹珍), the mayor of Xainza, explored Changtang with local nomads to locate land suitable for grazing. In 1974, more than 5,000 members of the Naktsang tribe of Xainza moved north to what is now Nyima. In 1976, more than 2,000 Xainza nomads reached Tsonyi (Shuanghu) after a month-long trek. Nyima County and Shuanghu County were established in 1993 and 2013, respectively. Plans to further develop Shuanghu were abandoned in 1994 due to wildlife conservation concerns.

In 2019, the Tibet Autonomous Region relocated inhabitants from 3 townships in northern Shuanghu to Gonggar County, Shannan in an effort to address the extreme living conditions and altitude-related diseases in Shuanghu. In 2022, the relocation was extended to 4 more townships in the southern part of the county.

== People ==
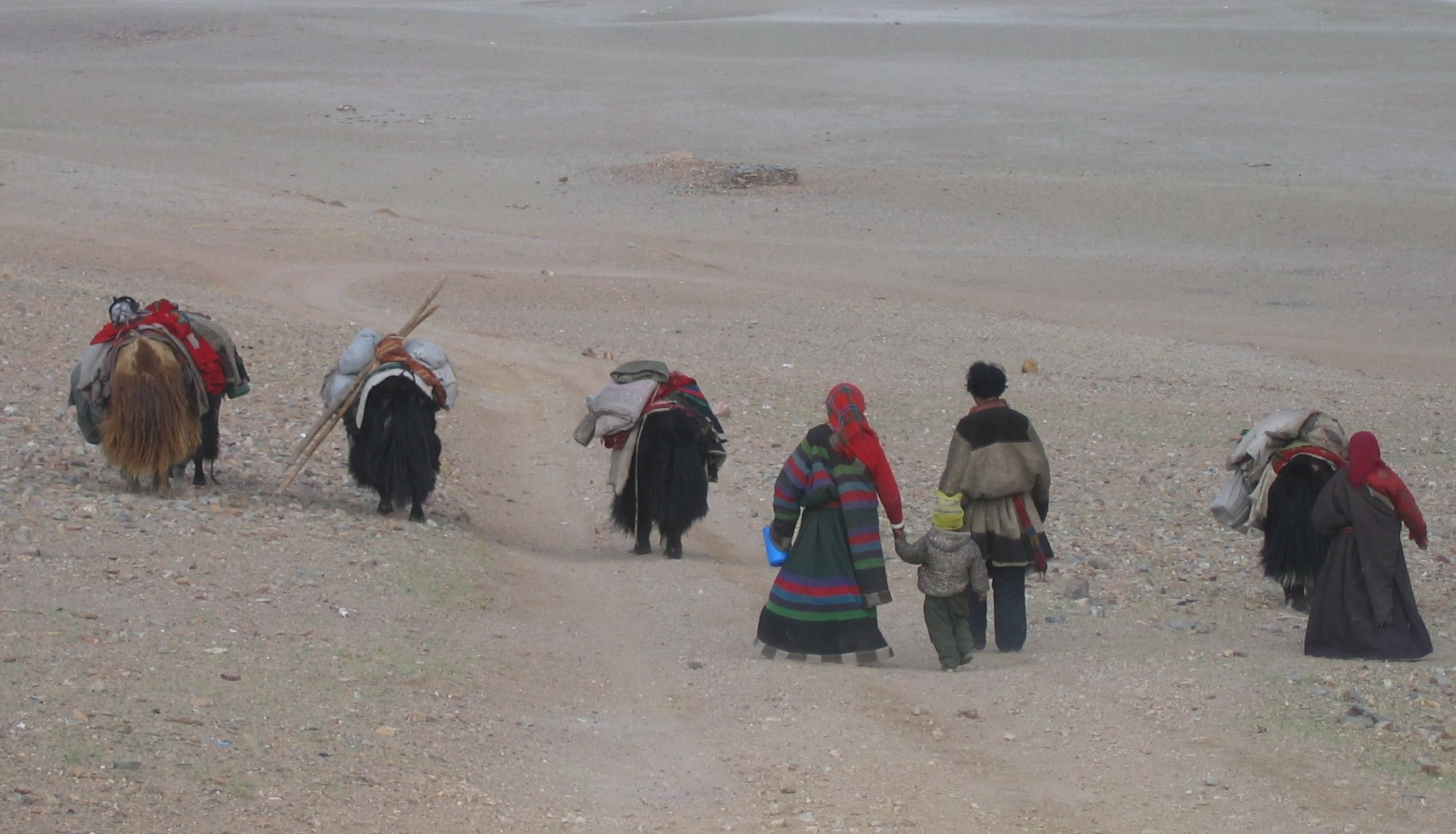
Changpa nomadic people in Tibet

The people of the Changtang plateau are nomadic pastoralists. They are known as "Changpa", for "northerners", or "Drokpa" for "nomads" in Tibetan. As of 1989 there were half a million nomads living in Changtang. Unlike many other nomadic groups, the Changpa are not under pressure from settled farmers as the vast majority of land they inhabit is too inhospitable for farming.

The economy of the region is based around the livestock of the Changpa, and the most important resource is the plants the animals graze on. The transhumance of the Changpa over one year limits the impact that their animals have on the grazing lands, the grasses of which are dead for eight to nine months of the year and provide poor fodder during that time. Unlike many other nomadic pastoralists, the Changpa do not move from one climatic region to another; this allows them to move shorter distances in many cases, ranging between 10–40 miles. Migratory routes are established and followed year after year, staying in the same encampments each year, often in camps that have stone walls for corrals and for sheltering the tents. Wealthier nomads may have buildings for storage and living in for the part of the year they spend at that encampment.

In addition to changing pastures, there are numerous other techniques developed by the Changpa to even out the periods of surpluses and shortages. Dairy products are converted into less perishable forms (like butter and cheese) during the summer when the livestock are producing high amounts of milk. Animals are slaughtered early in the winter, after fattening up in the summer and while the weather is conducive to storage.

Trade has played an important role for the Changpa as they are not able to produce all the goods they consume. Salt, meat, live animals, wool, and unprocessed cashmere are traded for basics such as grain, cooking pots, and other metal implements, as well as more modern goods.

== Chang Tang Nature Reserve ==
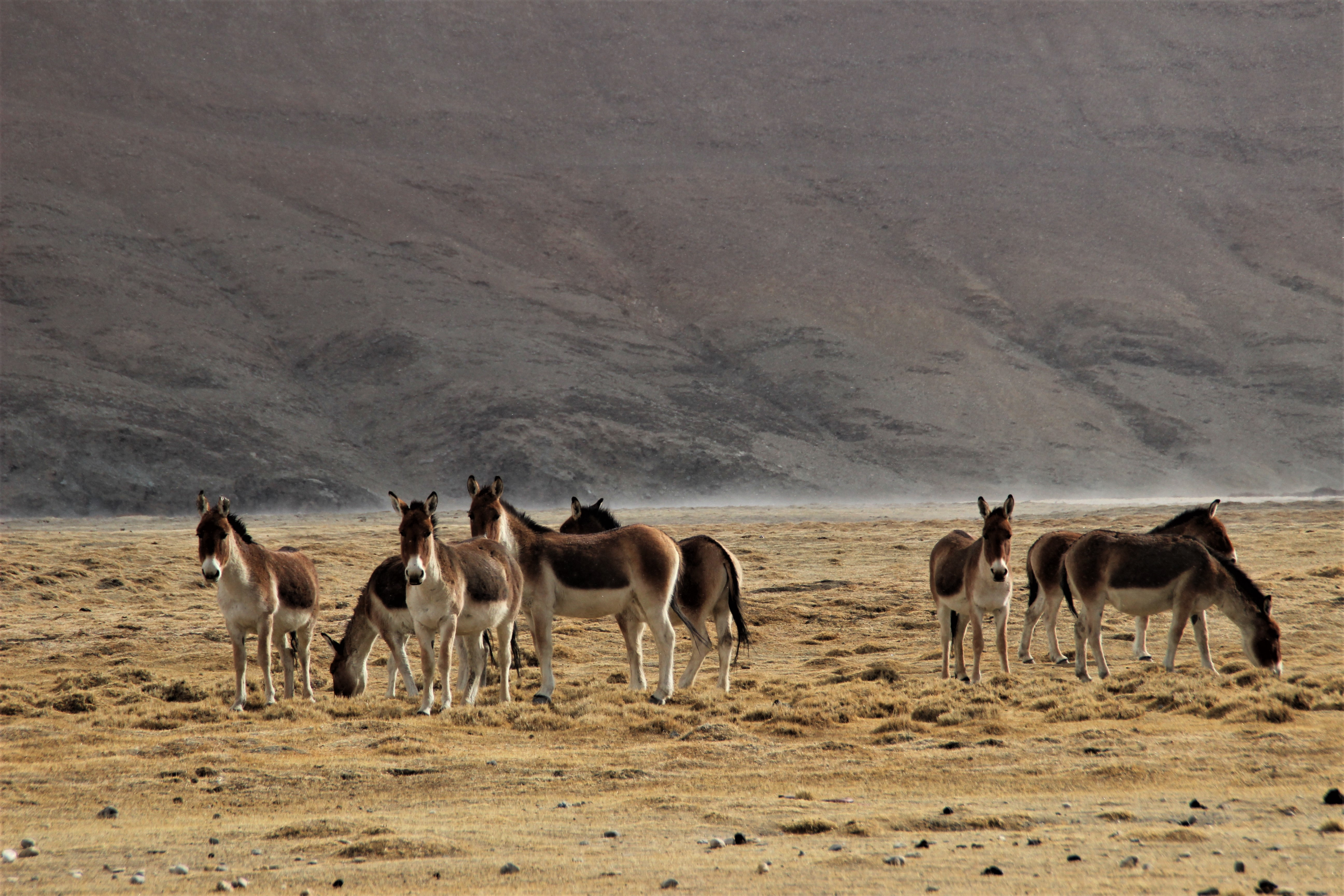
Kiang (Tibetan wild asses) in Changtang

Most of Tibetan Changtang is protected nature reserves, the largest of which is the Chang Tang Nature Reserve, the second-largest land nature reserve in the world, after the Northeast Greenland National Park. The reserve has an area of 298,000 square kilometres (115,000 sq mi) with an average elevation of over 5,000 metres (16,000 ft). Administratively, it spans six counties in the Nagqu and Ngari prefectures of northern Tibet. The Chang Tang Nature Reserve protects the alpine desert ecosystem of the plateau and 36 protected animal species. More than 200,000 Tibetan antelopes, 10,000 wild yaks, and 90,000 Tibetan wild asses can be found in the reserve, along with snow leopards, black-necked cranes, Tibetan foxes, Siberian ibex, blue sheep, and Himalayan vultures. A national park is being planned in Changtang.

== Ladakhi Changtang ==
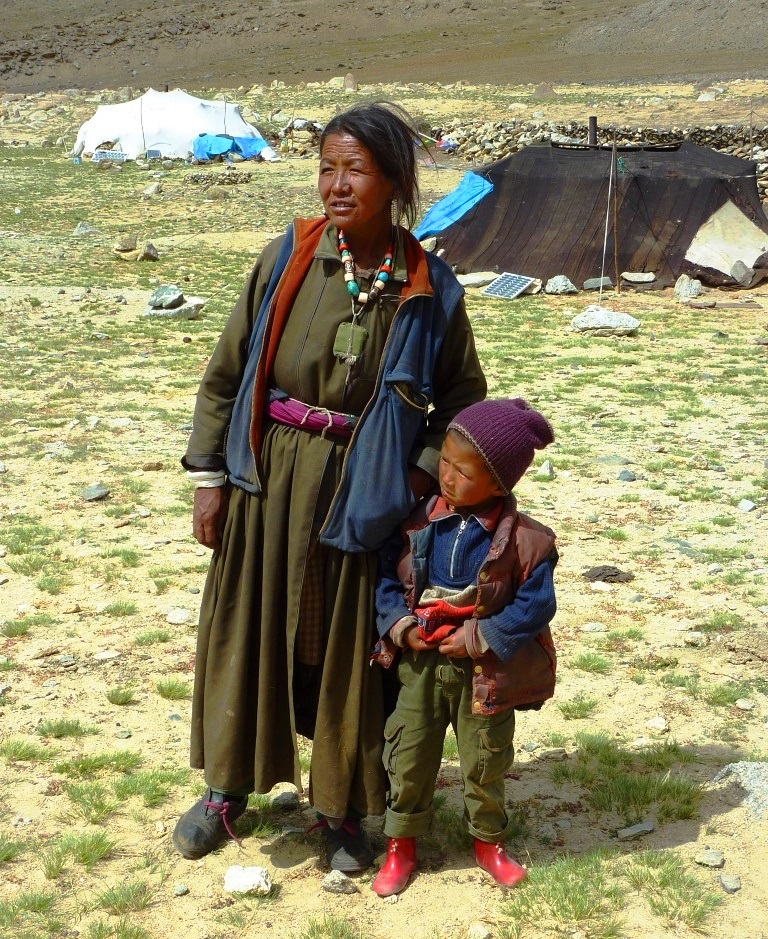
Nomad mother and son. Changtang, Ladakh

Only a small part of Changtang crosses the border into Ladakh in India. It is, however, on a historically important route for travellers journeying from Ladakh to Lhasa, and now has many different characteristics due to being part of India. As in the rest of Ladakh, Changtang has been experiencing many socio-economical developments since the late 20th century.

=== Hamlets ===
Ladakhi Changtang has 41 villages and hamlets inhabited by about 8,000 people. These settlements are scattered across the high-altitude plateau with an average elevation of 4,700 metres (15,400 ft). The temperature in the region varies from −5 to −35 °C (23 to −31 °F) in winter and up to a maximum of 30 °C (86 °F) in summer. Large areas of Changtang are semi-arid with very little vegetation growth. Agricultural lands and pastures are confined to limited areas along the riverbanks. The average snowfall is less than 10 mm (0.39 in) occurring usually during the months of December, January and February. Unusual and excess snowfall as happened in March 2013, can be fatal to the livestock of the nomads. Sometimes, goats and sheep cannot get access to the grass for grazing for period up to 15 days. This constitutes the most critical part of the year for the nomads.

=== Changthang Wildlife Sanctuary ===
The Changthang Wildlife Sanctuary (or the Changthang Cold Desert Wildlife Sanctuary) is a high altitude wildlife sanctuary located in the Ladakhi adjunct of the Changtang plateau in Ladakh. It is important as one of the few places in India with a population of the kiang or Tibetan wild ass, as well as the rare black-necked crane. The sanctuary is home to many rare species of flora and fauna, with natural grasslands and more than 200 species of wild plants. The village of Karzok is 4,560 metres (14,960 ft) above sea level is situated on the northwest bank of Tsomoriri and is claimed to be the world's highest year-round inhabited village.

The altitude of the sanctuary varies from 4,300 to 5,800 metres (14,000 to 19,000 ft), and the topography is formed of deep gorges and vast plateaus. There are around 11 lakes and 10 marshes, and the area is surrounded by three large lakes, the Tsomoriri, the Tsokar Lake and the Pangong Tso. Tso Moriri is among the highest lakes of its size in the world, 120 km^{2} (46 sq mi) with a maximum depth of 40 m (130 ft) and situated at an elevation of 4,525 m (14,846 ft). Tso Moriri is a Ramsar site. Pangong Tso, spanning Ladakh and Tibet's Rutog County, is situated at an elevation of around 4,240 m (13,910 ft) and is 134 km^{2} (52 sq mi). The water in Ladakh is salty, in Tibet less so. The Indus River flows through the sanctuary, dividing it into two parts.

The cold desert of this wildlife sanctuary is sparse but the marginal conditions have resulted in species with some remarkable characteristics. Seven rare and endangered plants which some believe have medicinal properties were discovered here by C.P. Kala. Three of these species are listed as vulnerable and one as endangered on the IUCN Red List (Arnebia euchroma, Geranium sibiricum, Lancea tibetica, Lloydia serotina, and Ephedra gerardiana).

The Changthangi (Pashmina goat) is famous for its ultra fine Cashmere wool. Pashmina in Persian means 'made from wool' and in Kashmiri it translates to 'soft gold'. This breed of goat inhabits the Changtang plateau and therefrom gets its name. Pashmina shawls are hand spun in Kashmir and Nepal.

== See also ==
- Changthangi, breed of goat
- Hoh Xil, plateau in Tibet
- Hemis National Park
- Karakorum Wildlife Sanctuary
- Tourism in Ladakh
