= Tangra Yumco =

Salt lake in Tibet

Tangra Yumco (Dang Reyongcuo)
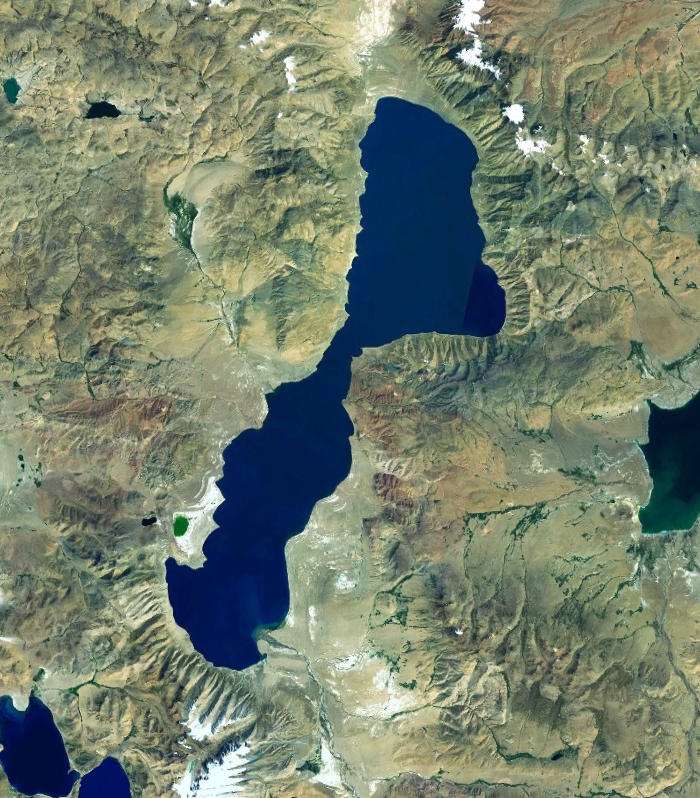
- Satellite Image of Tangra Yumco

- Location within Tibet
- Coordinates: 31°00′N 86°34′E
- Type: Endorheic, Saline, Permanent, Natural
- Primary inflows: Daguo Zangbu, Buzhai Zangbu
- Catchment area: 8,219.7 km^{2} (3,173.6 sq mi)
- Basin countries: China
- Max. length: 71.7 km (45 mi)
- Max. width: 19.4 km (12 mi)
- Surface area: 835.8 km^{2} (300 sq mi)
- Surface elevation: 4,528 m (14,856 ft)

Tangra Yumco (Tibetan: དྭངས་རྭ་གཡུ་མཚོ, Wylie: dwangs rwa g.yu mtsho, Chinese: 当惹雍错; pinyin: dāng rě yōng cuò) is a salt lake in Tibet, China. It is in the southwest of Nyima County. Tangra Yumco is 835.8 square kilometres (322.7 sq mi), with a drainage area of 8,219.7 square kilometres (3,173.6 sq mi), an elevation of 4,528 metres (14,856 ft), length 71.7 kilometres (44.6 mi) and mean width 11.65 kilometres (7.24 mi) (maximum width 19.4 metres [64 ft]). It is the holy lake of the Bön believers.

== Climate ==
Climate data for Tangra Yumco
Month	Jan	Feb	Mar	Apr	May	Jun	Jul	Aug	Sep	Oct	Nov	Dec	Year
Mean daily maximum °C (°F)	−2.3 (27.9)	−0.6 (30.9)	2.3 (36.1)	6.8 (44.2)	10.9 (51.6)	15.6 (60.1)	15.4 (59.7)	14.3 (57.7)	12.5 (54.5)	7.5 (45.5)	1.8 (35.2)	−0.8 (30.6)	7.0 (44.5)
Daily mean °C (°F)	−10.3 (13.5)	−8.4 (16.9)	−5.0 (23.0)	−0.7 (30.7)	3.3 (37.9)	8.2 (46.8)	9.4 (48.9)	8.7 (47.7)	6.2 (43.2)	0.1 (32.2)	−5.8 (21.6)	−8.9 (16.0)	−0.3 (31.5)
Mean daily minimum °C (°F)	−18.2 (−0.8)	−16.2 (2.8)	−12.3 (9.9)	−8.2 (17.2)	−4.3 (24.3)	0.9 (33.6)	3.4 (38.1)	3.1 (37.6)	0.0 (32.0)	−7.2 (19.0)	−13.4 (7.9)	−16.9 (1.6)	−7.4 (18.6)
Average precipitation mm (inches)	4 (0.2)	3 (0.1)	5 (0.2)	5 (0.2)	7 (0.3)	21 (0.8)	66 (2.6)	72 (2.8)	27 (1.1)	7 (0.3)	1 (0.0)	3 (0.1)	221 (8.7)
Source: Climate-Data.org
