= Shahtoosh =

Indian wool obtained from chiru fur

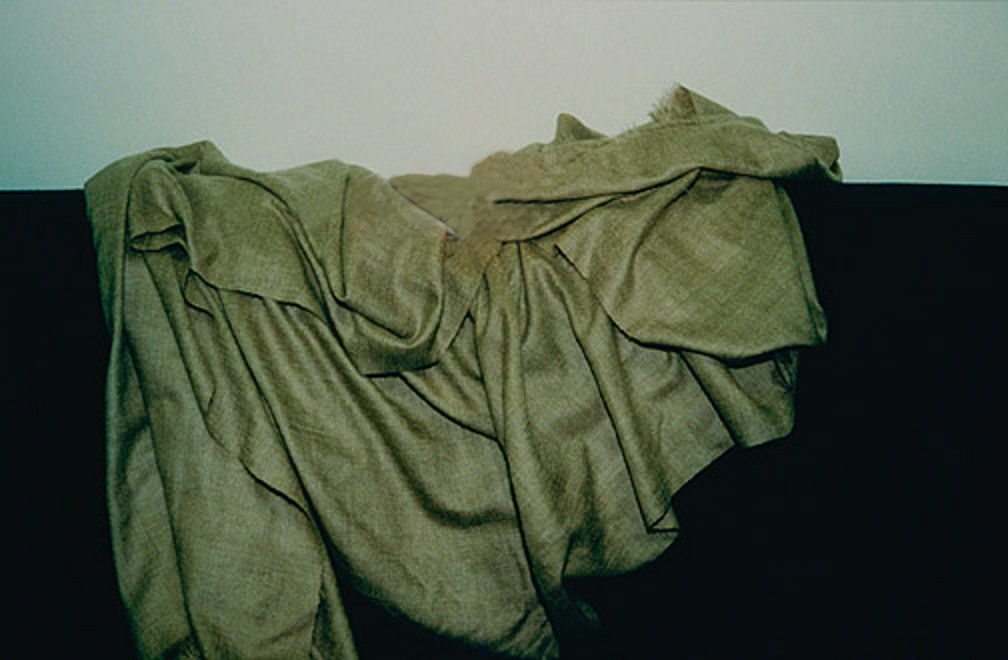
Shahtoosh shawl

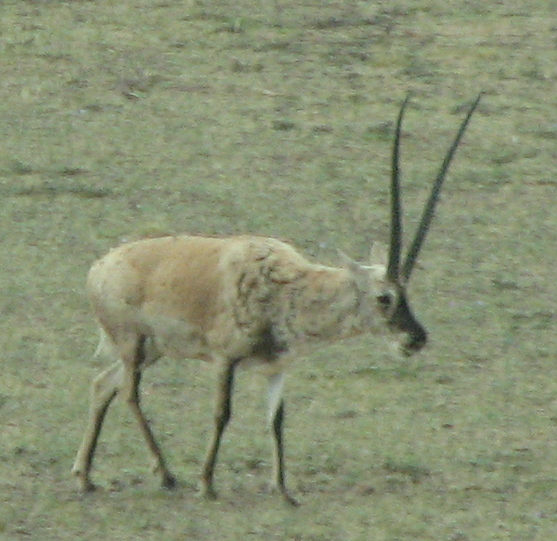
Shahtoosh is made from the fur of the wild chiru

Shahtoosh (/ˌʃɑːˈtuːʃ/; from Persian شاهتوش 'wool king') is an Indian wool obtained from fur of the chiru, a Tibetan antelope.

The chiru is a wild animal, and cannot be commercially shorn, so it is killed for its fleece to be harvested. Due to the severe decline of the chiru population by 90% in the second half of the 20th century, it was internationally classified as a critically endangered species until 2016. Since 2016, it has been classified as a near threatened species, due to species conservation programs and partial recovery of population size. Although the production, sale, and acquisition of shahtoosh has been illegal under CITES since 1979, the wool is mostly used to make luxury scarves and shawls. On the black market, shahtoosh shawls fetch prices ranging from $5,000 to $20,000.

Under sixteenth century Mughal emperor Akbar the Great, the imperial wardrobe began to utilize Tus or Shahtoosh on a large scale. It was the costliest, warmest and most delicate shawl. It was soft enough to pass through a finger ring. Its natural colours were black, white and red. It is said that Akbar once gave orders for the white to be dyed into red, but the shawl did not take the colour of the dye. People began to use it simply in its natural colours.

== Properties ==
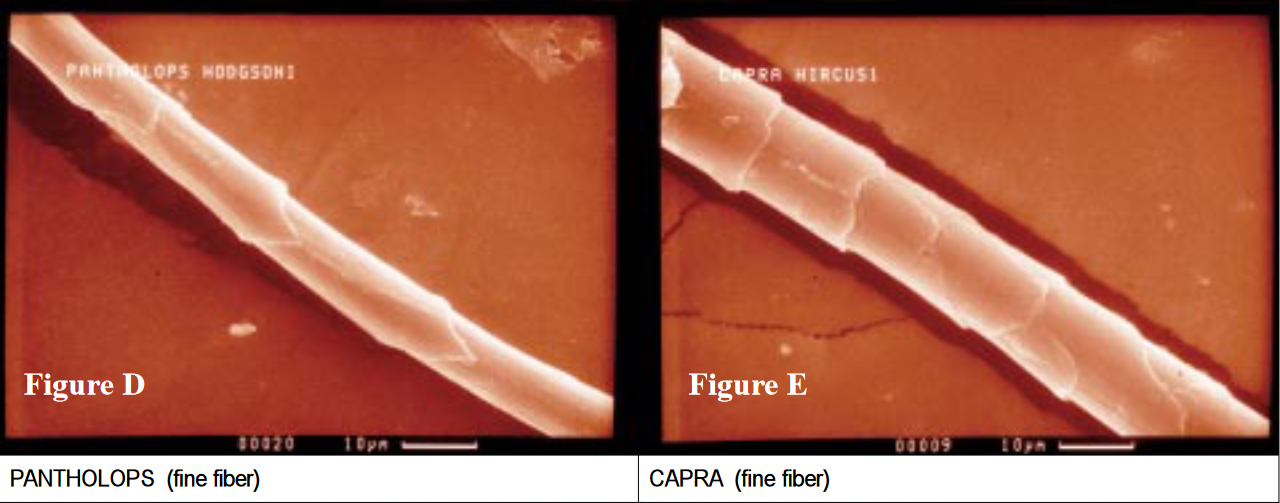
Chiru down hair (left) and cashmere down hair (right) comparison via scanning electron microscope

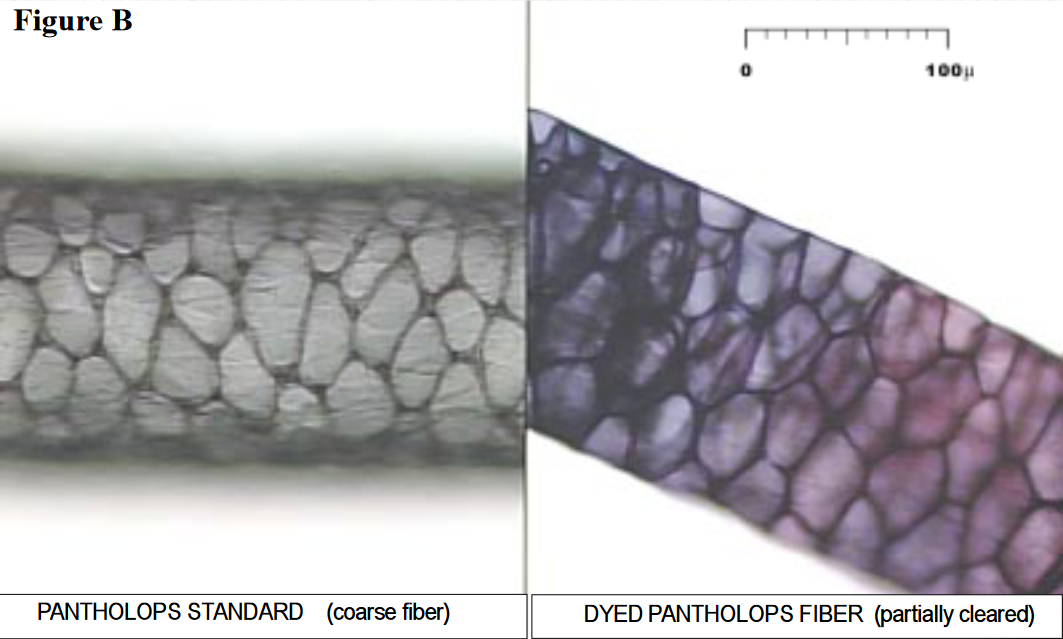
Chiru guard hair comparison undyed and dyed via light microscope

The average fiber diameter of the down hair is 11.45 microns with a standard deviation of 1.78 microns and a coefficient of variation of 15.55%, and a span from 6.25 to 16.25 microns. Because of the small fiber diameter, the down hair of the chirus is the finest of all animal hairs. The down hair is wavy and mosaic scaled with a scale spacing of 5.3 scales per 100 microns. The scale width tapers in the upward direction of the hair to the next scale ring. At the scale edge, the hair is thicker, making the fiber diameter uneven along the length of the hair. The hair of the chirus is beige to gray, and white on the belly. Only 12-14 % of the down hair is white and more expensive. The lighter the hair color, the lighter the shades that can be dyed.

The guard hairs are separated from the down hair by sorting. However, due to the fineness and low tensile strength of the fiber, sorting can only be done manually and incompletely, resulting in guard hairs in scarves. Due to tiny air bubbles in the hair, the guard hairs of shahtoosh show a pattern like laid stone slabs under a light microscope. This allows shahtoosh to be distinguished from cashmere wool products under a light microscope, where guard hairs of cashmere wool look like dark stripes with light-colored edges.

== Use ==
The animals live wild on the Tibetan Plateau, in the Changtang region, Tibet, Xinjiang, and Qinghai. In spite of being under species protection, they are killed for the illegal production of textiles in order to obtain the particularly fine warming wool hair of the undercoat. Each chiru produces only about 125-150 grams of the raw wool, requiring three to five animals to make a scarf. A population of about one million in the 1950s dropped drastically to an estimated 45,000 in 1998, then, following species protection, rose to 75,000 by 2000, then doubled to about 150,000 animals by 2009. The wool is shipped from the Tibetan Changtang area to Kashmir, where it is processed into scarves in the Srinagar area. In 2003, it was estimated that over 14,000 people were directly or indirectly involved in the production of shahtoosh shawls. Efforts are underway in India to domesticate some chirus so that shorn shahtoosh can be legally used.

Shahtoosh wool is spun and woven, either in rectangular plain weave or diamond-shaped plain weave (called chashme bulbul 'eye of the nightingale' or 'diamond weave'). Along with thinly woven shawls made from other wools, shahtoosh shawls can be pulled through a finger ring due to the small diameter of the fibers (resulting in the 'ring test' for fineness). By admixing pashmina wool, shahtoosh can be embroidered more extensively. Blended fabrics of shahtoosh and pashmina are designated differently according to the proportions: Shurah Dani = 100% Shahtoosh, Bah Dani = 75% Shahtoosh and 25% Pashmina, Aeth Dani = 50% Shahtoosh (as warp) and 50% Pashmina (as weft). Shawls for women are often 2 m × 1 m in size and weigh circa 100 g, while shawls for men are often 3 m × 1.5 m (called doshala).

== Law enforcement ==
An investigation on a 1994 charity event in New York by the United States Fish and Wildlife Service led to the subpoenaing of celebrities who purchased shahtoosh scarves, as well as the first criminal cases for the sale of this material in the US. In April 2000, British authorities fined a London-based trading company for the illegal possession of 138 scarves. Between 2010 and 2018, a total of 295 scarves were confiscated in Switzerland, corresponding to an average of 33 scarves per year. Despite some successful arrests of illegal trafficking rings, a large number of petty criminals get away with it, as it is usually claimed to be pashmina or similar legal fabrics. A clear clarification that can be used in court is only obtained after a laboratory examination (DNA test), or measurement under a scanning electron microscope.

== See also ==
- Kekexili: Mountain Patrol - a film based on the Wild Yak Brigade of the 1990s that sought to limit poaching for shahtoosh
