= Domar (Shuanghu) =

Domar རྡོ་དམར་ Duoma
- Township
- Location within Tibet
- Coordinates: 32°22′59″N 89°8′38″E
- Country: China
- Region: Tibet
- Prefecture: Nagqu Prefecture
- County: Shuanghu County
- Elevation: 4,695 m (15,404 ft)

Population (2004)
  - Total: 1,488
  - Major Nationalities: Tibetan
  - Regional dialect: Tibetan language
- Time zone: +8

Domar (Tibetan: རྡོ་དམར་, Wylie: rdo dmar, THL: do mar), Duoma or Duomaxiang (Chinese: 多玛乡; pinyin: Duō mǎ xiāng) is a village and township-level division of Shuanghu County in the Nagqu Prefecture of the Tibet Autonomous Region, in China. It is located roughly 140 kilometres (87 mi) west of Amdo Town and roughly 50 kilometres (31 mi) north of Siling Co, near the western bank of a lake at the foot of the Tanggula Mountains. As of 2004 it had a population of 1,488 people.

The principal economic activity is animal husbandry, with pastoral yak, goat and sheep. The township is very rich in fish and mineral resources, and as many as 30 kinds of mineral which are found there, including coal, iron, chromium, iron, copper, zinc, antimony, molybdenum, gold dust, rock gold, borax, platinum, silver, rock crystal, jade, mica, salt, oil, etc.

== Administrative divisions ==
The township-level division contains the following villages:

- Zhongluma Village (仲鲁玛村)
- Guogen Caqu Village (果根擦曲村)
- Sanawo Village (萨那沃村)
- Lajia Luma Village (拉加鲁玛村)
- Gakama Village (嘠喀玛村)

== See also ==
- List of towns and villages in Tibet
