= Hoh Xil =

Plateau in China

Qinghai Hoh Xil
UNESCO World Heritage Site
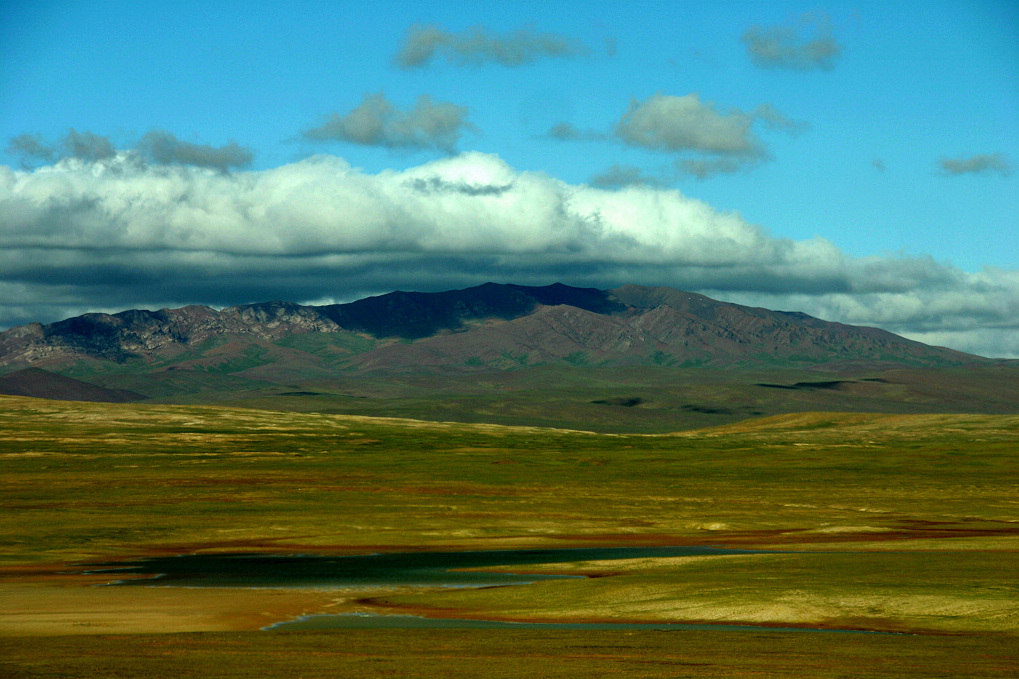
- Hoh Xil in August

- Location within Qinghai
- Location: Qinghai
- Criteria: Natural: (vii)(x)
- Reference: 1540
- Inscription: 2017 (41st Session)
- Area: 3,735,632 ha (9,230,950 acres)
- Buffer zone: 2,290,904 ha (5,660,950 acres)
- Coordinates: 35°22′49″N 92°26′21″E

Hoh Xil

Chinese name
- Simplified Chinese: 可可西里
- Traditional Chinese: 可可西里
- Literal meaning: Blue ridge (in Mongolic)
Transcriptions
Standard Mandarin
- Hanyu Pinyin: Kěkěxīlǐ
- Wade–Giles: K'e^{3}k'e^{3}hsi^{1}li^{3}
- IPA: [kʰɤ̀kʰɤ̀ɕílì]

Tibetan-origin name
- Simplified Chinese: 阿卿贡嘉
- Traditional Chinese: 阿卿貢嘉
- Literal meaning: Lord of ten thousand mountains
Transcriptions
Standard Mandarin
- Hanyu Pinyin: Āqīnggòngjiā
- Wade–Giles: A^{1}ch'ing^{1}kung^{4}chia^{1}
- IPA: [átɕʰíŋkʊ̂ŋtɕjá]

Tibetan name
- Tibetan: ཧོ་ཧོ་ཞི་ལི ཨ་ཆེན་གངས་རྒྱབ
Transcriptions
- Wylie: ho ho zhi li a chen gangs rgyab
- THL: Hohozhili; Achenganggyap
- Tibetan Pinyin: Hohoxili; Aqênganggyab
- Lhasa IPA: [ho˥˥.ˌho.ɕi˩˨.ˈli a˥˥.ˌt͡ɕʰẽː.kaŋ˩˧˨.ˈɟʌ(p̚)ˀ]

Mongolian name
- Mongolian Cyrillic: Хөх шил
- Mongolian script: ᠬᠥᠬᠡ ᠰᠢᠯᠢ
Transcriptions
- SASM/GNC: Köke sil

Hoh Xil or Kekexili (Mongolian for "Blue Ridge", also Aqênganggyai for "Lord of Ten Thousand Mountains") is an isolated region in the northeastern part of Qinghai-Tibet Plateau. On July 7, 2017, the Hoh Xil in Qinghai was listed among the UNESCO World Heritage Sites as "the largest and highest plateau in the world".

== Geography ==
The region covers 83,000 square kilometres at an average elevation of 4,800 metres above sea level, stretches in the east–west direction between the Tanggula and Kunlun mountain chains in the border areas of southwest China's Tibet Autonomous Region, northwest China's Qinghai Province and China's Xinjiang Uyghur Autonomous Region. The southeastern part of the Hoh Xil, drained by the Chumar River (楚瑪爾河), is one of the major headwater sources of the Yangtze River. The rest of the region is endorheic, with drainage to numerous isolated lakes; this area is sometimes described by hydrologists as the "Hoh Xil lake district". 45,000 square kilometres of the Hoh Xil region, at an average elevation of 4,600 metres, were designated a national nature reserve in 1995. The UNESCO World Heritage Site is encompassed of the western half of Zhidoi County and western part of Qumarlêb County in Qinghai. Bukadaban Feng is considered part of Hoh Xil.

== Geology ==
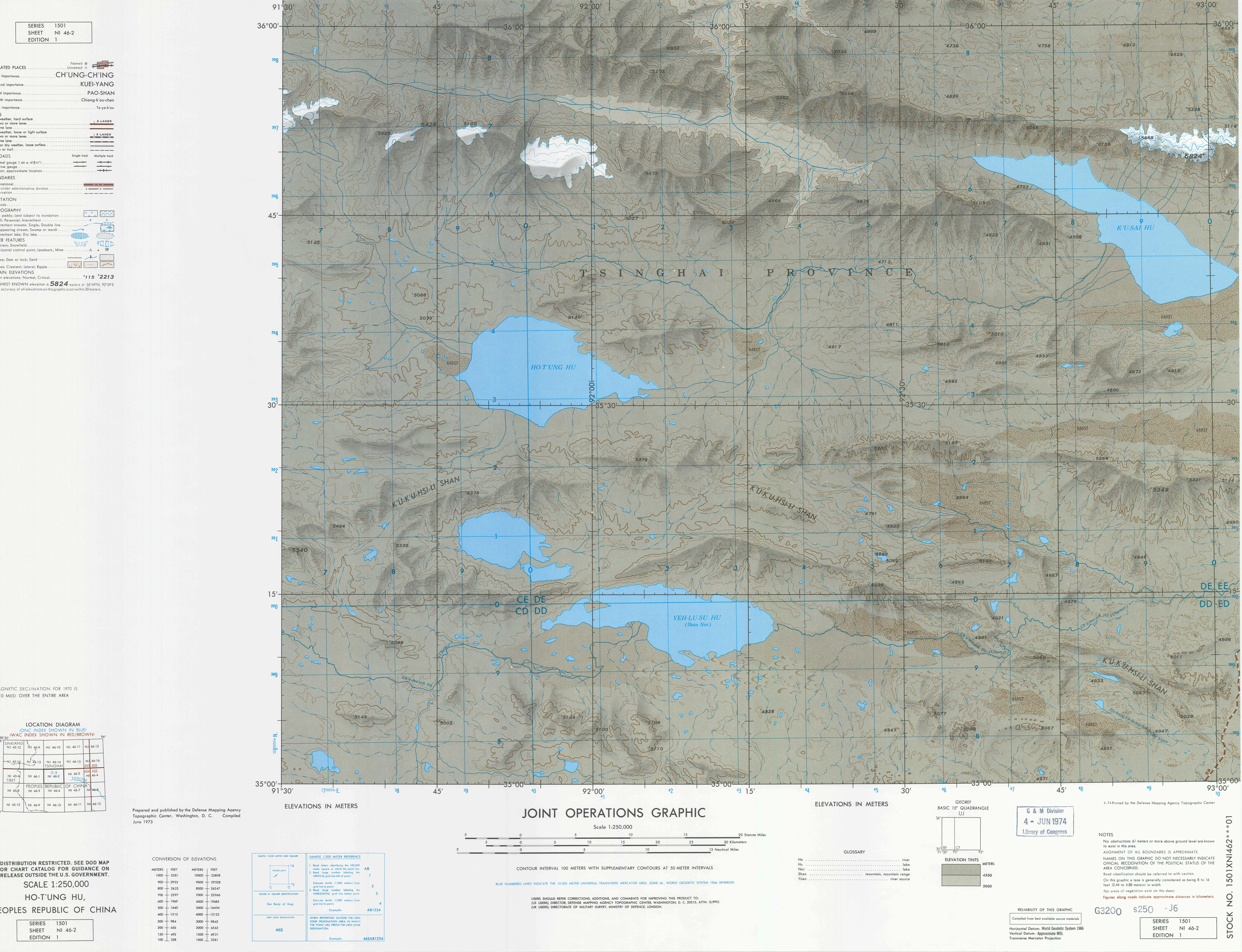

Hoh Xil is volcanic. The surrounding Northern Tibet volcanic field contains a number of late-Cenozoic volcanoes. Several Hawaiian-style volcanoes are present in this area. Bamaoqiongzong covers an area of 300 km^{2} and contains a perfectly preserved edifice NE of the summit and a lava flow that overlies Quaternary lake deposits . The Bamaoqiongzong area contains peralkaline phonolitic and foiditic rocks. Yongbohu contains five dacitic, trachyandesitic and andesitic vents. Qiangbaqian covers a broad area along the southern border of the Kunlun mountain range. A cone in the Kekexili caldera, once thought to be observed in eruption on a satellite photo in 1973, is now considered not to have been historically active.Synonyms & Subfeatures

== Wildlife ==
Despite the harsh climate, Hoh Xil is home to more than 230 species of wild animals, 20 of which are under Chinese state protection, including the wild yak, wild donkey, white-lip deer, brown bear and the endangered Tibetan antelope or chiru. The abundant plateau pika, a small burrowing rodent, is the main food of the region's brown bears; the bears also feed on the yak and antelope. The hitherto little-known region, as well as the struggling Tibetan antelope, or chiru, became household names in China upon the release of the film Kekexili: Mountain Patrol in 2004. Zhuonai Lake (卓乃湖) in Hoh Xil is known as a gathering place for the Tibetan antelope.

== Transportation ==
The Qingzang Railway and China National Highway 109 run along the eastern boundary of the reserve. The Fenghuoshan Tunnel, presently the world's highest railway tunnel (1338 m long, with entrances located at an elevation of 4905 metres above sea level), was constructed in the area.

== See also ==
- Changtang
