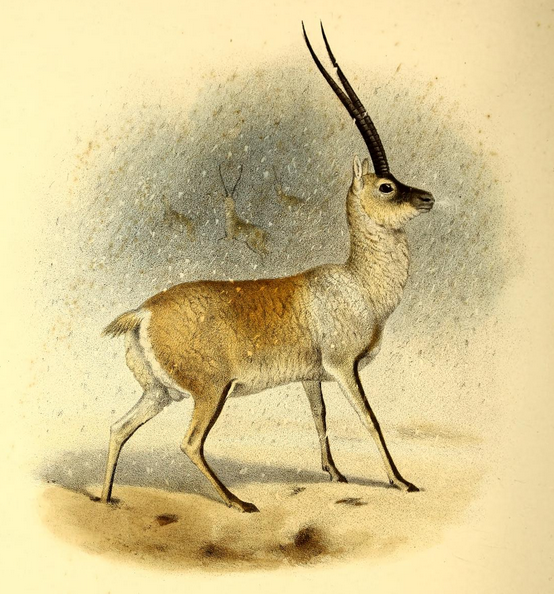

Conservation status
- Near Threatened (IUCN 3.1)
- CITES Appendix I

Scientific classification
- Kingdom: Animalia
- Phylum: Chordata
- Class: Mammalia
- Order: Artiodactyla
- Family: Bovidae
- Subfamily: Caprinae
- Tribe: Pantholopini
- Genus: Pantholops; Hodgson, 1834
- Species: P. hodgsonii

Binomial name
- Pantholops hodgsonii (Abel, 1826)
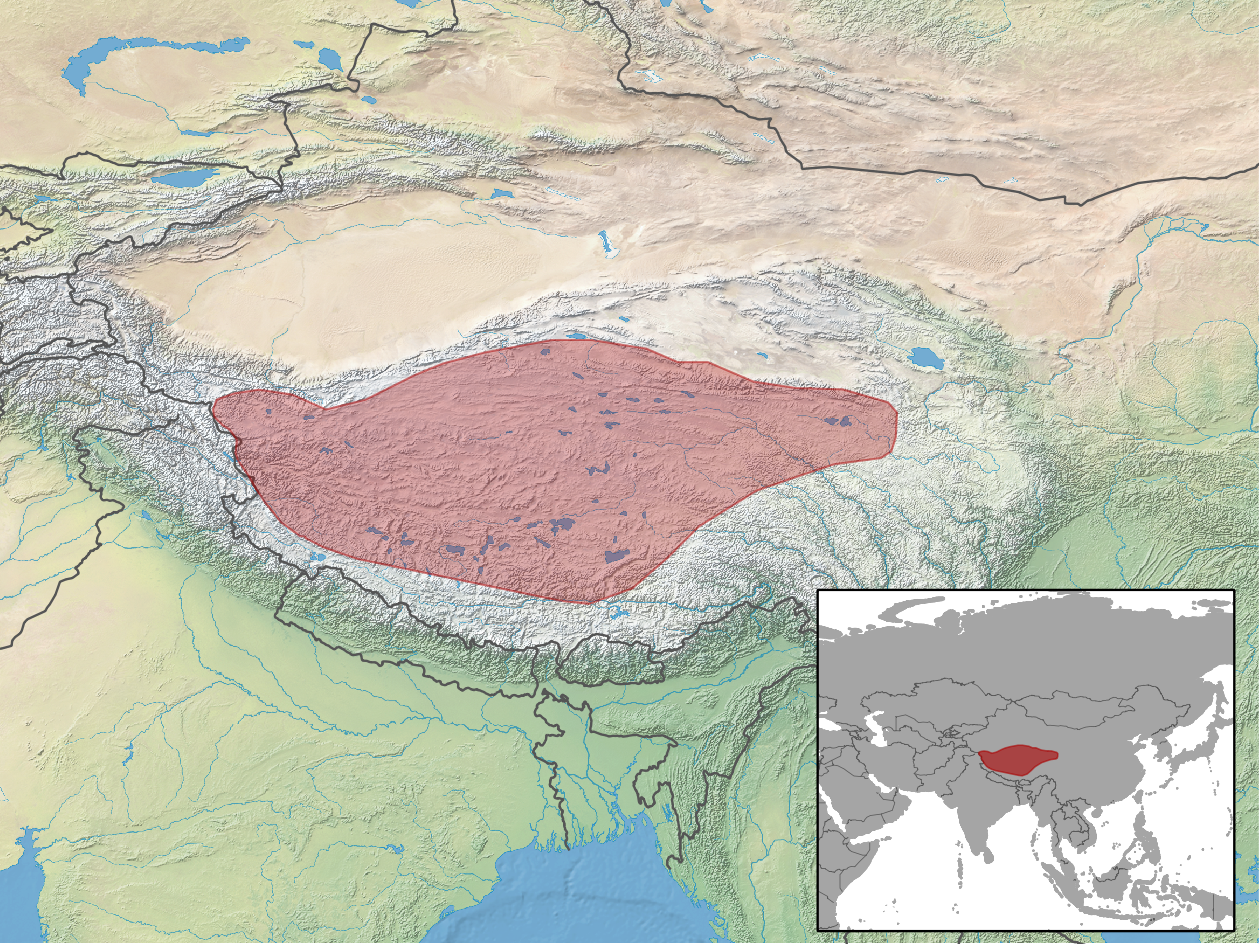

= Tibetan antelope =

Species of mammal

The Tibetan antelope or chiru (Pantholops hodgsonii) (Tibetan: གཙོད་, Wylie: gtsod, pronounced [tsǿ]; Chinese: 藏羚羊; pinyin: zànglíngyáng) is a medium-sized bovid native to the northeastern Tibetan Plateau. Most of the population lives within the Chinese border, while some are scattered across India and Bhutan in the high-altitude plains, hill plateau, and montane valley. Fewer than 150,000 mature individuals are left in the wild, but the population is currently thought to be increasing.

In the 1980s and 1990s, they had become endangered due to massive illegal poaching. They are hunted for their extremely soft, light, and warm underfur, which is usually obtained after death. This underfur, known as shahtoosh (a Persian word meaning "king of fine wools"), is used to weave luxury shawls. Shahtoosh shawls were traditionally given as wedding gifts in India, and it takes the underfur of three to five adult antelopes to make one shawl. Despite strict controls on the trade of shahtoosh products and CITES listing, there is still demand for these luxury items. Within India, shawls are worth $1,000–$5,000; internationally, the price can reach as high as $20,000. In 1997, the Chinese government established the Hoh Xil National Nature Reserve (also known as Kekexili) solely to protect the Tibetan antelope population.

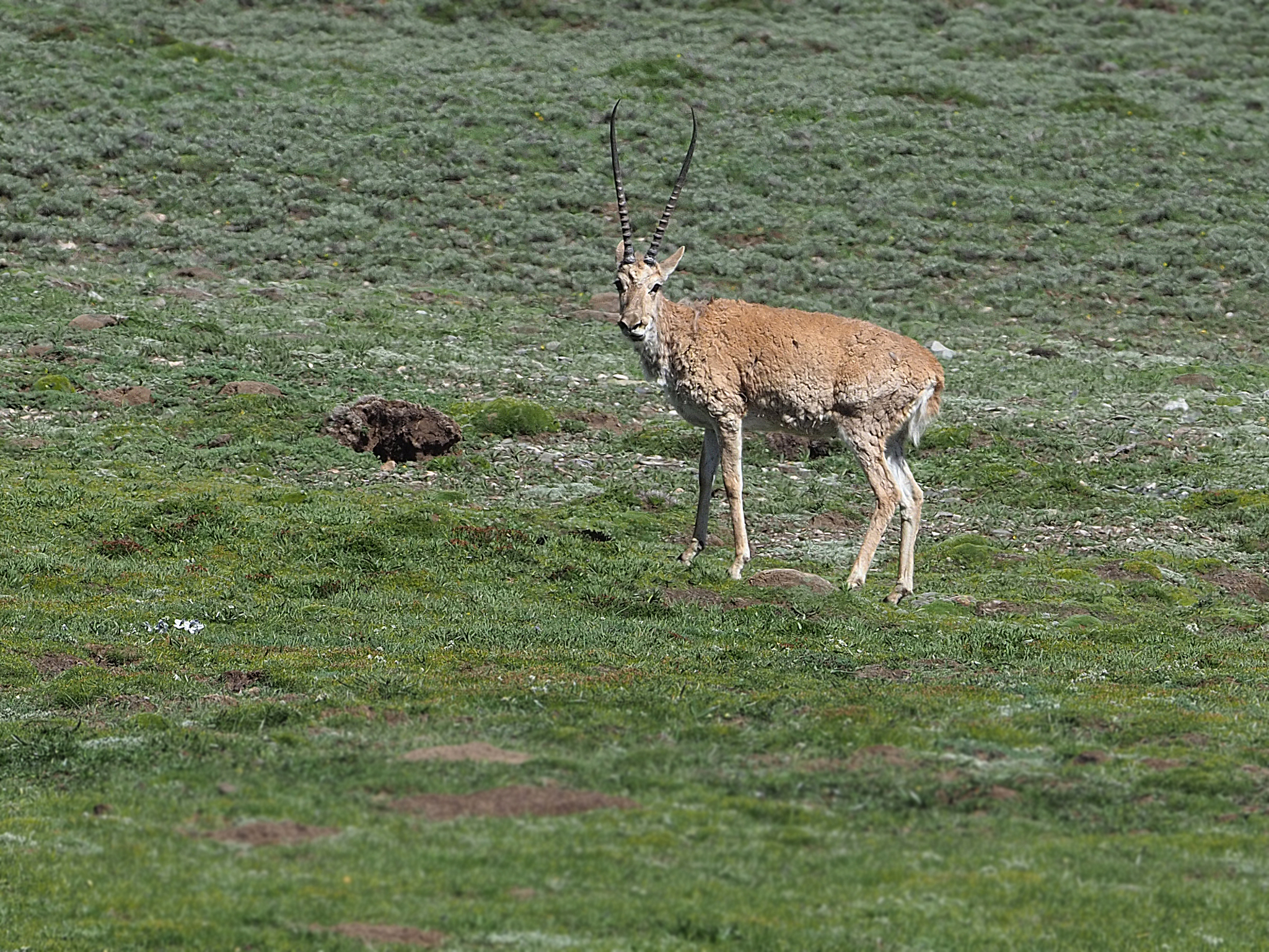
Chiru in Qinghai, China

== Classification ==
The Tibetan antelope is the sole species in the genus Pantholops, named after the Greek for "all antelope". It was formerly classified in the then-subfamily Antilopinae (now thought to be the tribe Antilopini), but morphological and molecular evidence led to it being placed in its own subfamily, Pantholopinae, closely allied to goat-antelopes of the then-subfamily Caprinae. However, this has been disputed, and most authorities now consider the Tibetan antelope to be a true member of the Caprinae, or the tribe Caprini. Phylogenetic evidence indicates that Pantholops is the most basal member of the Caprinae / Caprini, and belongs to its own tribe or subtribe, Pantholopini or Pantholopina.

Although the genus Pantholops is currently monotypic, a fossil species, P. hundesiensis, is known from the Pleistocene of Tibet. It was slightly smaller than the living species, with a narrower skull. In addition, the fossil genus Qurliqnoria, from the Miocene of China, is thought to be an early member of the Pantholopini, which diverged from the goat-antelopes around this time.

== Description ==
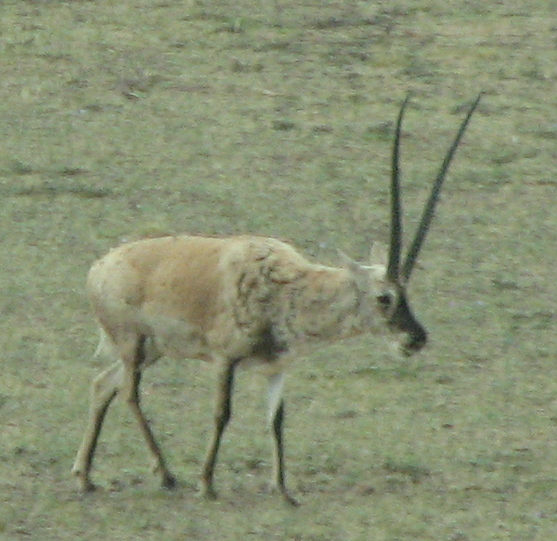
Tibetan antelope in the Changtang Nature Reserve

The Tibetan antelope is a medium-sized antelope, with a shoulder height of about 83 cm (32 1/2 in) in males, and 74 cm (29 in) in females. Males are significantly larger than females, weighing about 39 kg (86 lb), compared with 26 kg (57 lb), and can also be readily distinguished by the presence of horns and by black stripes on the legs, both of which the females lack. The coat is pale fawn to reddish-brown, with a whitish belly, and is particularly thick and woolly. The face is almost black in colour, with prominent nasal swellings that have a paler colour in males. In general, the colouration of males becomes more intense during the annual rut, with the coat becoming much paler, almost white, contrasting with the darker patterns on the face and legs.

The males have long, curved-back horns that typically measure 54 to 60 cm (21 to 24 in) in length. The horns are slender, with ring-like ridges on their lower portions and smooth, pointed, tips. Although the horns are relatively uniform in length, there is some variation in their exact shape, so the distance between the tips can be quite variable, ranging from 19 to 46 cm (7 1/2 to 18 in). Unlike caprines, the horns do not grow throughout life. The ears are short and pointed, and the tail is also relatively short, at around 13 cm (5 in) in length.

The fur of Tibetan antelopes is distinctive, and consists of long guard hairs and a silky undercoat of shorter fibres. The individual guard hairs are thicker than those of other goats, with unusually thin walls, and have a unique pattern of cuticular scales, said to resemble the shape of a benzene ring.

== Distribution and habitat ==
Endemic to the Tibetan Plateau, the Tibetan antelope inhabits open alpine and cold steppe environments between 3,250 and 5,500 m (10,660 and 18,040 ft) elevation. They prefer flat, open terrain, with sparse vegetation cover. They are found almost entirely in China, where they inhabit Tibet, southern Xinjiang, and western Qinghai; a few are also found across the border in Ladakh, India. The westernmost population of Tibetan antelope is in Depsang Plains, where they are found at altitudes of up to 5500 m. Today, the majority are found within the Chang Tang Nature Reserve of northern Tibet. The first specimens to be described, in 1826, were from Nepal; the species has apparently since been extirpated from the region. No subspecies are recognised. Zhuonai Lake (卓乃湖) in Hoh Xil is known as a calving ground for the Tibetan antelope.

A special adaptation of the species to its high-altitude habitat is the retention of the fetal version of hemoglobin even in adult animals, which provides higher oxygen affinity. The Tibetan antelope is the only species of mammal where this adaptation has been documented.

== Behaviour ==
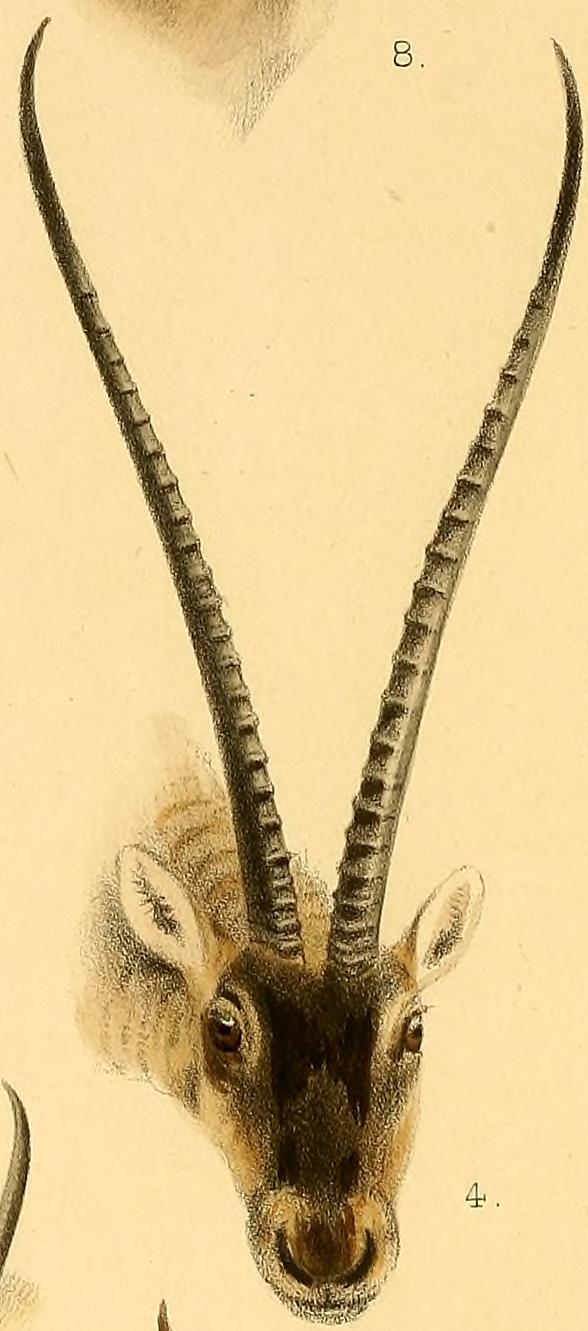
Head details

The Tibetan antelope feeds on forbs, grasses, and sedges, often digging through the snow to obtain food in winter. Their natural predators include wolves, lynx, snow leopards, and red foxes are known to prey on young calves.

Tibetan antelope are gregarious, sometimes congregating in herds hundreds strong when moving between summer and winter pastures, although they are more usually found in much smaller groups, with no more than 20 individuals. The females migrate up to 300 km (200 mi) yearly to calving grounds in the summer, where they usually give birth to a single calf, and rejoin the males at the wintering grounds in late autumn.

== Reproduction ==
The rutting season lasts from November to December. Males form harems of up to 12 females, although one to four is more common, and drive off other males primarily by making displays or chasing them with head down, rather than sparring directly with their horns. Courtship and mating are both brief, without most of the behaviour typically seen in other antelope species, although males do commonly skim the thighs of females with a kick of their fore legs.

Mothers give birth to a single calf in June or July, after a gestation period of about six months. The calves are precocial, being able to stand within 15 minutes of birth. They are fully grown within 15 months, and reach sexual maturity during their second or third year. Although females may remain with their mothers until they themselves give birth, males leave within 12 months, by which time their horns are beginning to grow. Males determine status by their relative horn length, with the maximum length being achieved at around three and a half years of age.

Although the lifespan of Tibetan antelopes is not known with certainty, since so few have been kept in captivity, it is probably around 10 years.

== Conservation ==
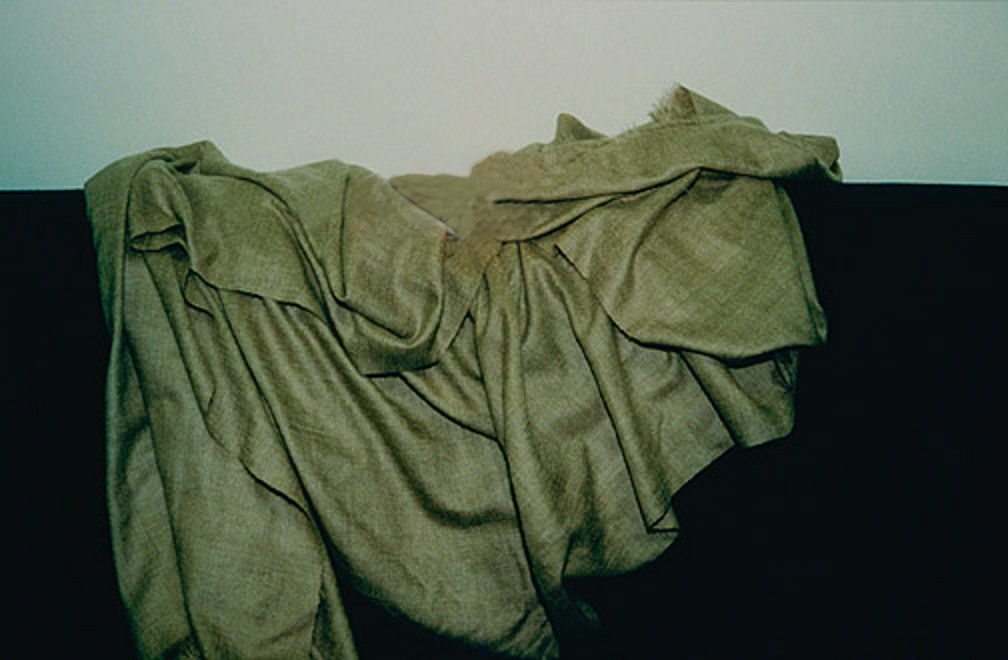
The antelope are killed for their wool, which is woven into the luxury fabric shahtoosh, threatening the species' survival.

Since 1979, Tibetan antelope has had legal protection under the Convention on International Trade in Endangered Species (CITES). Killing, harming or trading in the animal is illegal worldwide, as more than 160 countries are CITES signatories. It also used to be listed as Endangered by the World Conservation Union and the United States Fish and Wildlife Service due to commercial poaching for their underwool, competition with local domesticated herds, and the development of their rangeland for gold mining. Tibetan antelopes' underfur (down hair), being extremely soft, fine and warm, is known as shahtoosh and has traditionally been woven by craftsmen and women in Kashmir into shawls in high demand in India as girls' dowry and in Europe as a symbol of wealth and status. Such demands resulted in massive illegal poaching in the second half of the 20th century. In consequence, the population of this species has suffered a severe decline from nearly a million (estimated) at the turn of the 20th century to less than 75,000 in the 1990s. Although formerly affected by poaching, it is now among the best safeguarded wildlife in the Tibetan Plateau, thanks to effective conservation efforts by the Chinese government since late 1990s. These conservation initiatives were prompted in part by the 1994 killing of local official and environmentalist Sonam Dargye by armed poachers. His death brought national attention to the poaching of the species, and he was posthumously awarded the title of "Environmental Defender" by the Chinese government. A 2009 assessment estimated an increased population of 150,000. The struggle to stop illegal antelope hunting, based on the anti-poaching patrol founded by Sonam Dargye, was portrayed in the 2004 film, Kekexili: Mountain Patrol and 2026 television series Tree of Life. In September 2016, Tibetan antelope has been reclassified on the International Union for Conservation of Nature (IUCN) Red list from Endangered to Near Threatened due to the increased population.

To develop testing for shahtoosh, a Hong Kong chemist and a senior forensic specialist looked at the material though a microscope. Using this method, they discovered shahtoosh contains coarser guard hairs unique to the species. By doing this, the duo had found a convenient way to prove this was poached material.

In July 2006, the Chinese government inaugurated a new railway that bisects the chiru's feeding grounds on its way to Lhasa, the Tibetan capital. In an effort to avoid harm to the animal, 33 special animal migration passages have been built beneath the railway. However, the railway will bring many more people, including potential poachers, closer to Tibetan antelope's breeding grounds and habitat.

On 22 February 2008, The Wall Street Journal reported China's state-run news agency, Xinhua, issued a public apology for publishing a doctored photograph of Tibetan antelope running near the Qinghai-Tibet Railway. Liu Weiqing, a 41-year-old photographer, was identified as the author of the work. He had reportedly camped on the Tibetan plateau since March 2007, as part of a series by the Daqing Evening News, to raise awareness regarding the Tibetan bovid. He was also under contract to provide images to Xinhua. He has since resigned from Daqing Evening News. Researchers of the Chinese Academy of Sciences wrote in a 17 April 2008 letter to Nature, that despite the impression given by the faked photo, the antelopes are getting used to the railway.

In the Karakoram regions of Pakistan-administered Kashmir it is listed as an endangered species.

== See also ==
- List of endangered and protected species of China
