= Shuanghu County =

Shuanghu County 双湖县 • མཚོ་གཉིས་རྫོང་། Tsonyi, Co Nyi
- County
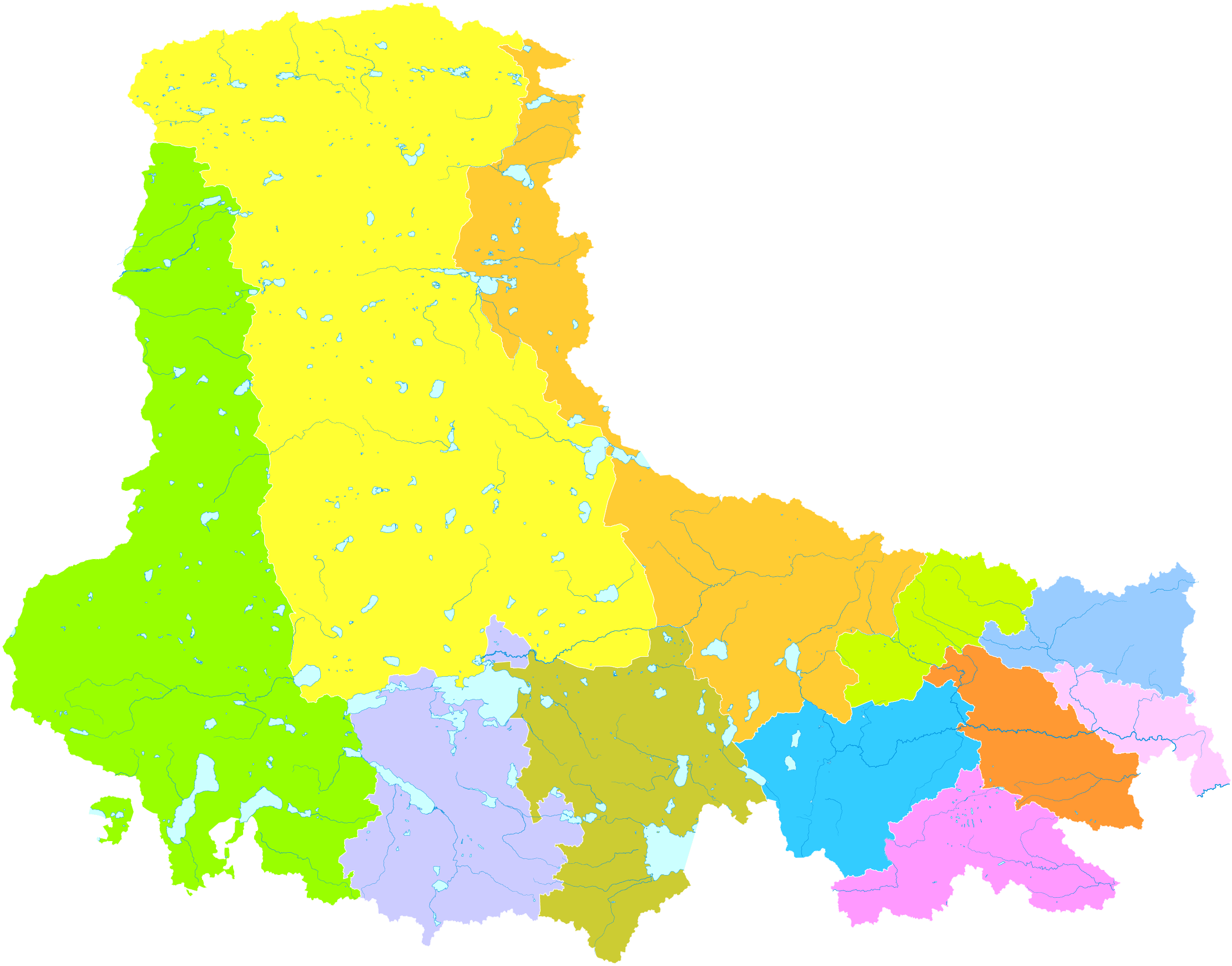
- Location of Shuanghu County (light yellow, #FFFF31) in Nagqu

- Location of the seat in the Tibet Autonomous Region Shuanghu (China)
- Coordinates: 33°11′32″N 88°50′10″E
- Country: China
- Autonomous region: Tibet
- Prefecture-level city: Nagqu
- County seat: Domar Township

Area
  - Total: 116,440.91 km^{2} (44,958.09 sq mi)
- Elevation: 4,960 m (16,270 ft)

Population (2020)
  - Total: 10,881
  - Density: 0.093447/km^{2} (0.24203/sq mi)
- Time zone: UTC+8 (China Standard)
- Website: www.xzsh.gov.cn

Shuanghu County

Chinese name
- Simplified Chinese: 双湖县
- Traditional Chinese: 雙湖縣
Transcriptions
Standard Mandarin
- Hanyu Pinyin: Shuānghú Xiàn

Tibetan name
- Tibetan: མཚོ་གཉིས་རྫོང་།
Transcriptions
- Wylie: mtsho gnyis rdzong
- Tibetan Pinyin: Conyi Zong

Shuanghu County (Chinese: 双湖县), also transliterated from Tibetan as Tsonyi County or Co Nyi County (Tibetan: མཚོ་གཉིས་རྫོང་།), is a county under the jurisdiction of the prefecture-level city of Nagqu, in the northernmost part of the Tibet Autonomous Region, China. It was formed in 2012, combining the territory of the former Shuanghu Special District (Chinese: 双湖特别区, Tibetan: མཚོ་གཉིས་དམིགས་བསལ་སྲིད་འཛིན་ཁུལ་) with the eastern half of Nyima County. Much of the county is within the Changtang area. Shuanghu is the highest county of China with an average elevation of more than 5,000 metres (16,000 ft), while its county seat is located at 4,920 metres (16,140 ft).

Both Tibetan and Chinese name translates to "twin lake" or "two lakes", the two lakes referred to as Khangro Lake (khang ro tshwa kha) and Rêjo Lake (re co tshwa kha) respectively. Shuanghu is very sparsely populated (averaging around 0.12 people per square kilometre, but concentrated in the southern portion of the county). The vast majority of its population practices nomadic pastoralism (mostly goats and sheep). The climate is very rough, cold and dry. A weather station in Shuanghu, established in 1999, on average measures negative temperatures (Celsius scale) throughout the year.

== History ==
In the 1970s, population growth in Xainza and Baingoin counties led to overgrazing and frequent conflicts. Xainza County launched surveys into the uninhabited Changtang region in the north of the county from 1971 to 1975, and identified several areas suitable for grazing. In 1976, 2,053 Xainza nomads reached Shuanghu after a month-long trek, together with their 160,000 cattle, goats and sheep. Shuanghu County was established in 2012.

In 2019, the Tibet Autonomous Region relocated inhabitants from 3 townships in northern Shuanghu to Gonggar County in an effort to address the extreme living conditions and altitude-related diseases in Shuanghu. In 2022, the relocation was extended to 4 more townships in the southern part of the county.

== Administrative divisions ==
The county has one town and six townships:

Name	Chinese	Hanyu Pinyin	Tibetan	Wylie
Town
Cozhêlhoma Town (Codrel Lhoma, Soggarluma)	措折罗玛镇	Cuòzhéluómǎ zhèn	ཚོ་འབྲེལ་ལྷོ་མ་གྲོང་རྡལ།	tsho 'bral lho ma grong rdal
Townships
Zhide Township (Xibdê)	协德乡	Xiédé xiāng	ཞི་བདེ་ཤང་།	zhi bde shang
Yachu Township	雅曲乡	Yǎqǔ xiāng	ཡ་ཆུ་ཤང་།	ya chu shang
Garco Township	嘎措乡	Gācuò xiāng	དཀར་མཚོ་ཤང་།	dkar mtsho shang
Tsodrel Jangma Township	措折强玛乡	Cuòzhéqiángmǎ xiāng	ཚོ་སྦྲེལ་བྱང་མ་ཤང་།	mtsho sbrel byang ma shang
Cozhêdangma Township (Tsodrel Jangma)	措折强玛乡	Cuòzhéqiángmǎ xiāng	ཚོ་སྦྲེལ་བྱང་མ་ཤང་།	mtsho sbrel byang ma shang
Domar Township	多玛乡	Duōmǎ xiāng	རྡོ་དམར་ཤང་།	rdo dmar shang
Parling Township	巴岭乡	Bālǐng xiāng	བར་གླིང་ཤང་།	bar gling shang

== Gallery ==
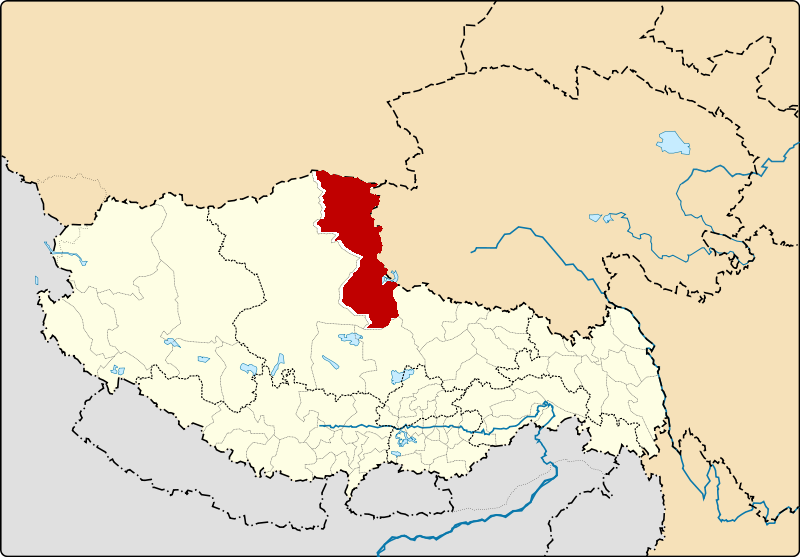
Location of Shuanghu Special District (outdated map, situation before 2012)

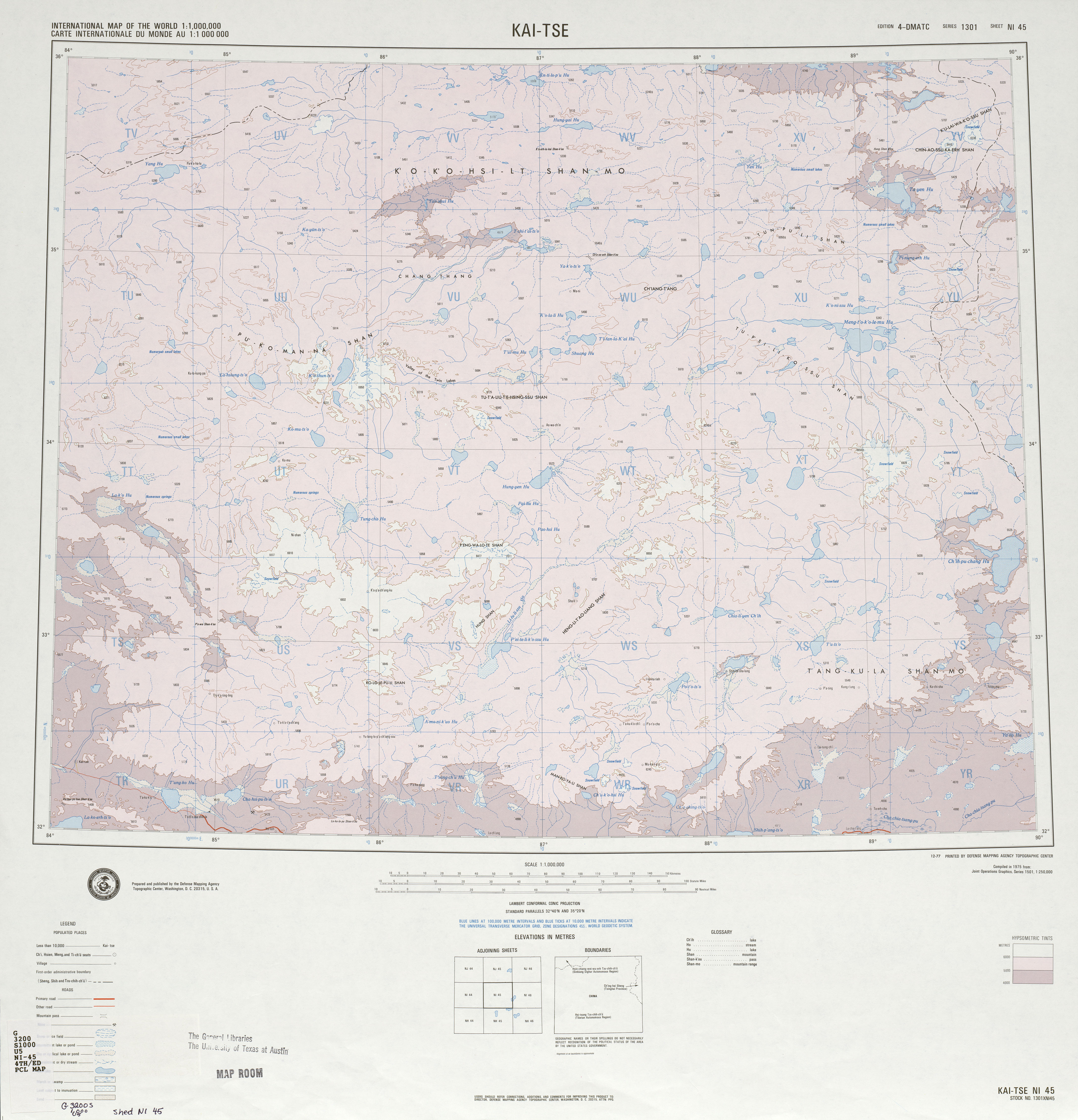
Map including northern Shuanghu and surrounding region (DMA, 1975)

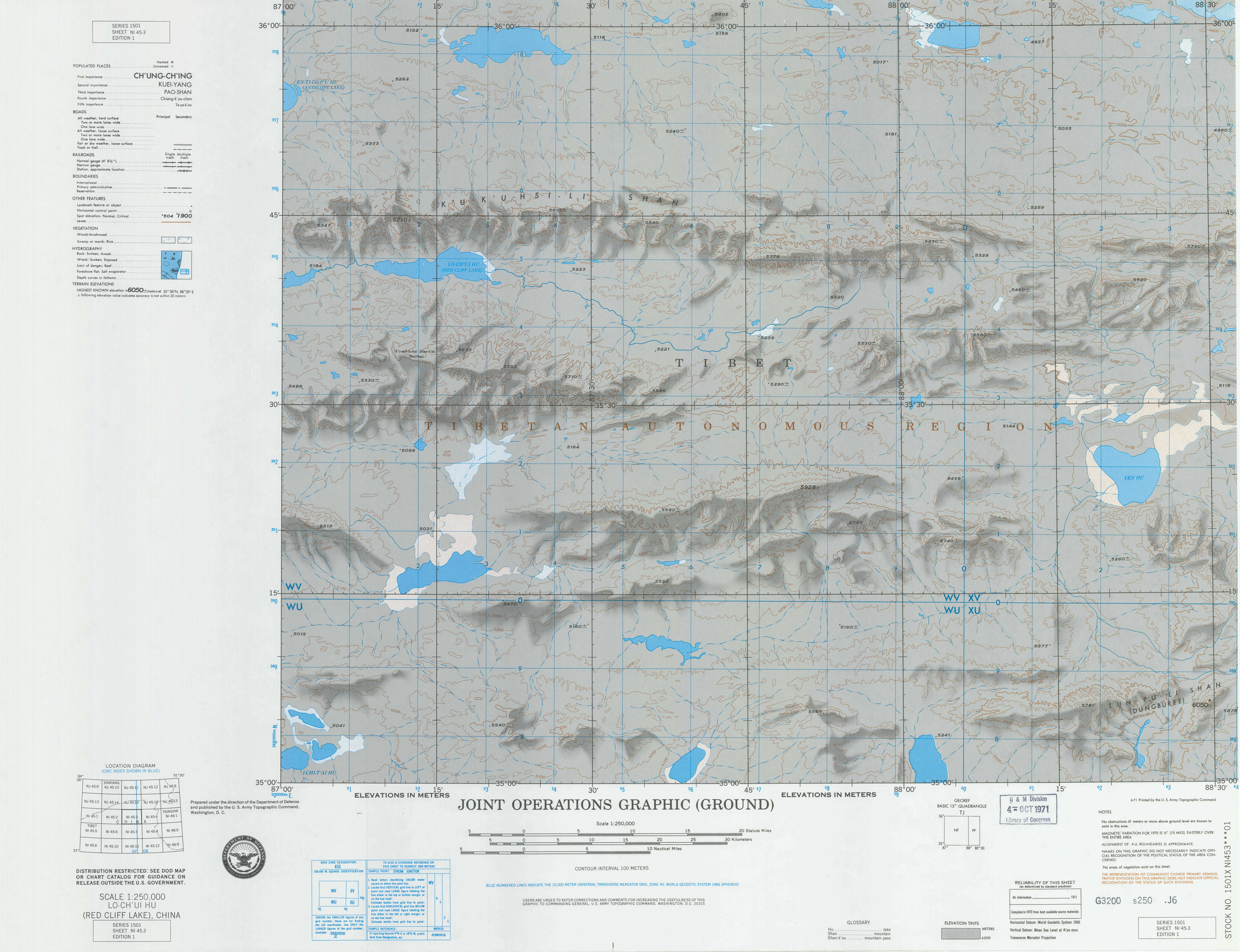

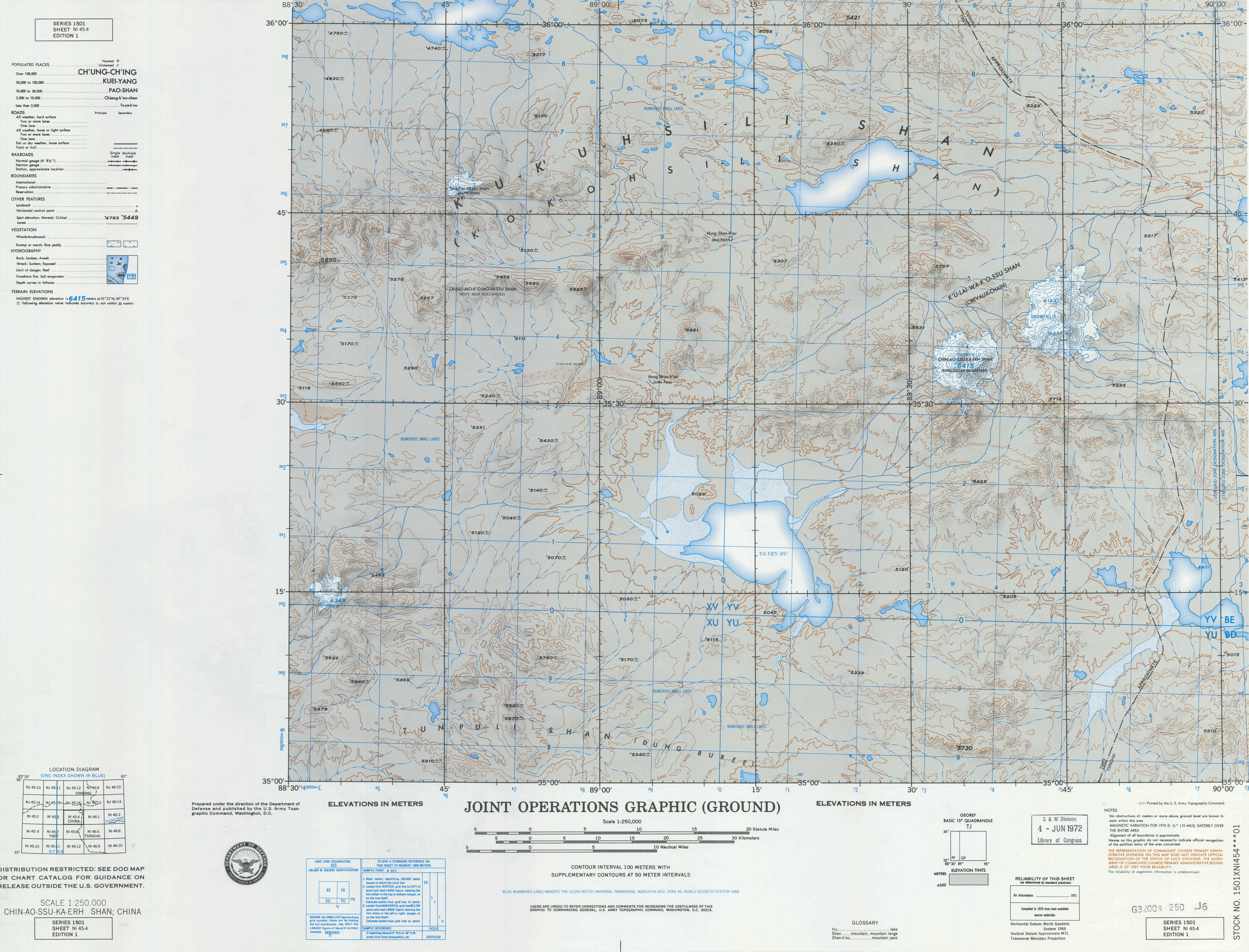

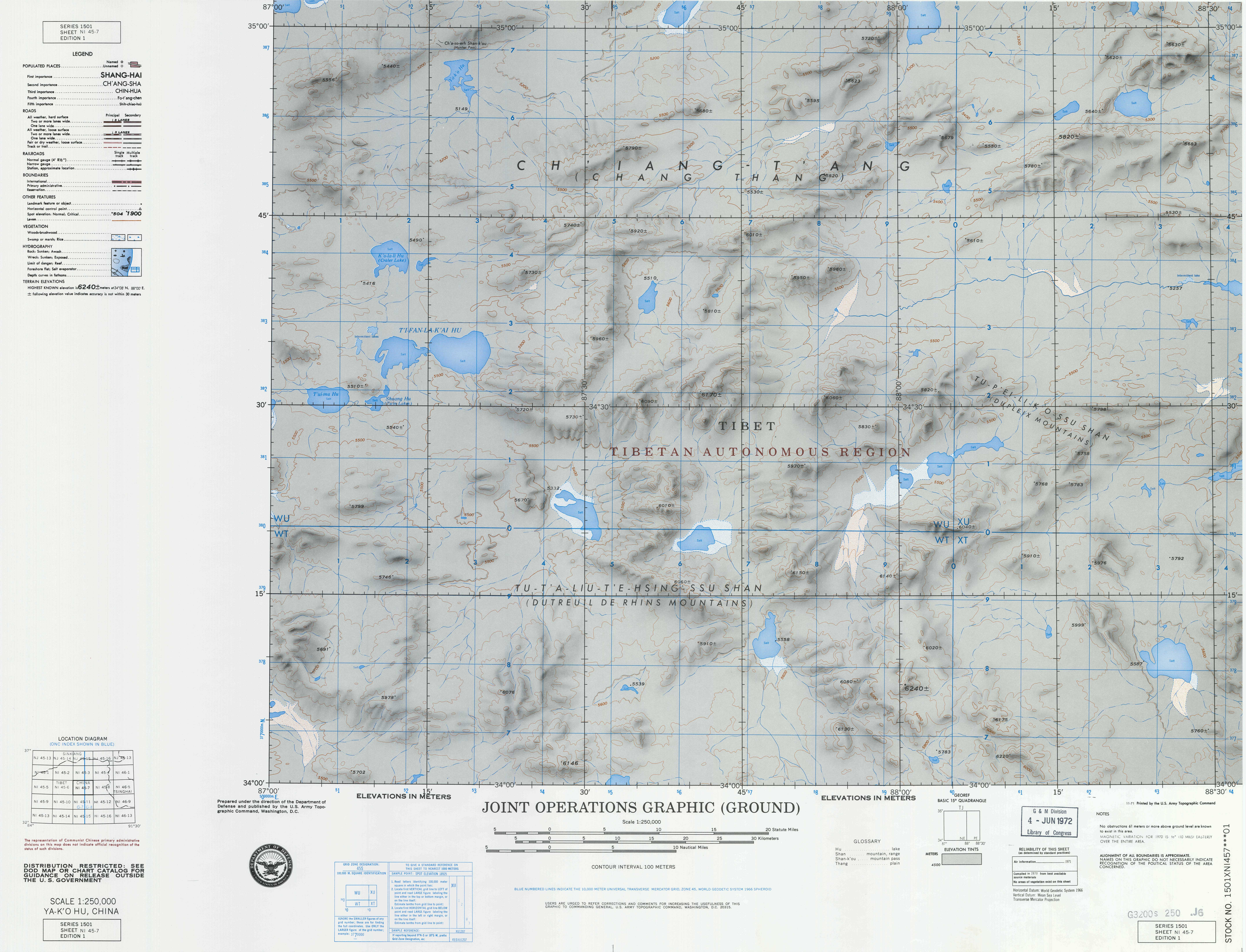

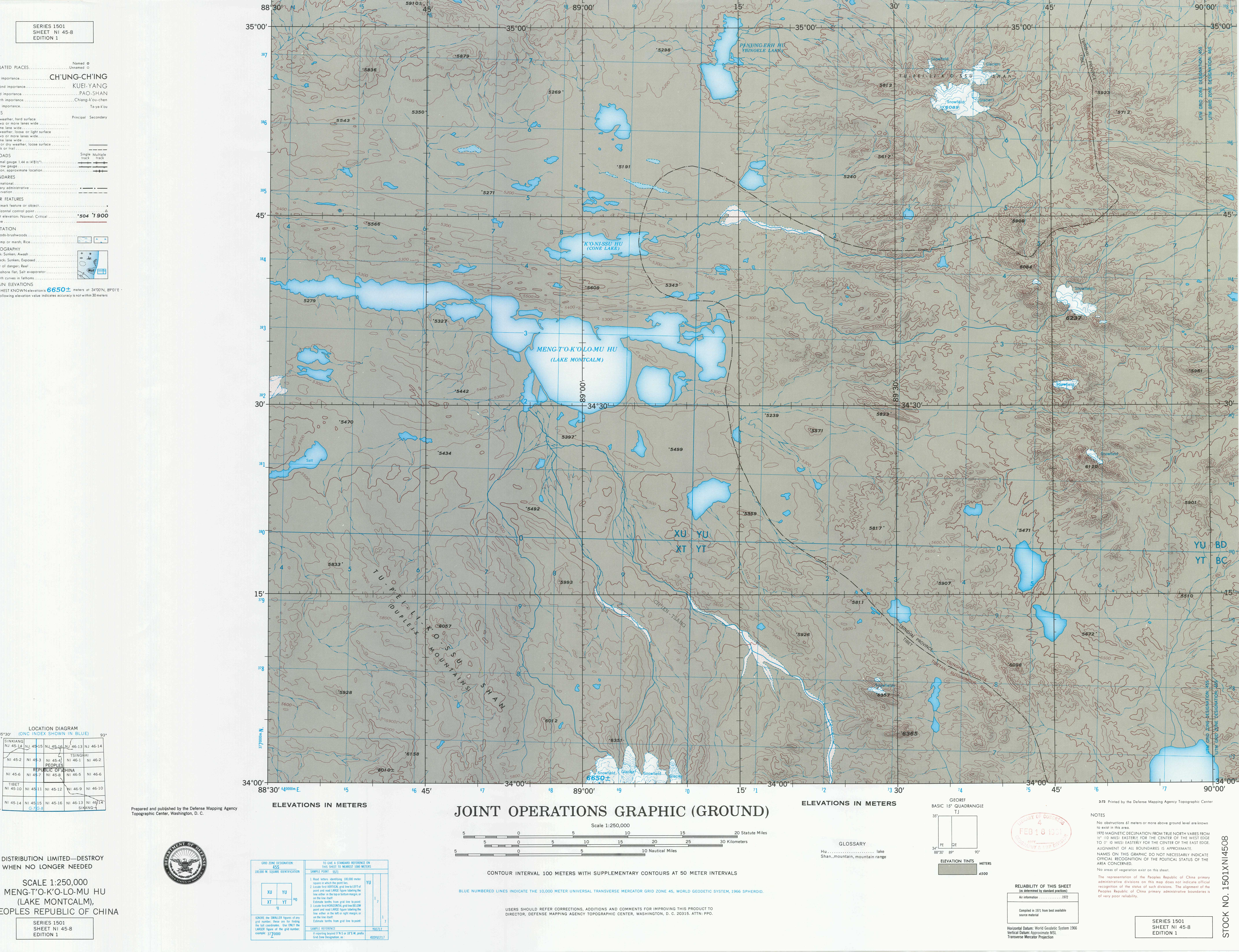

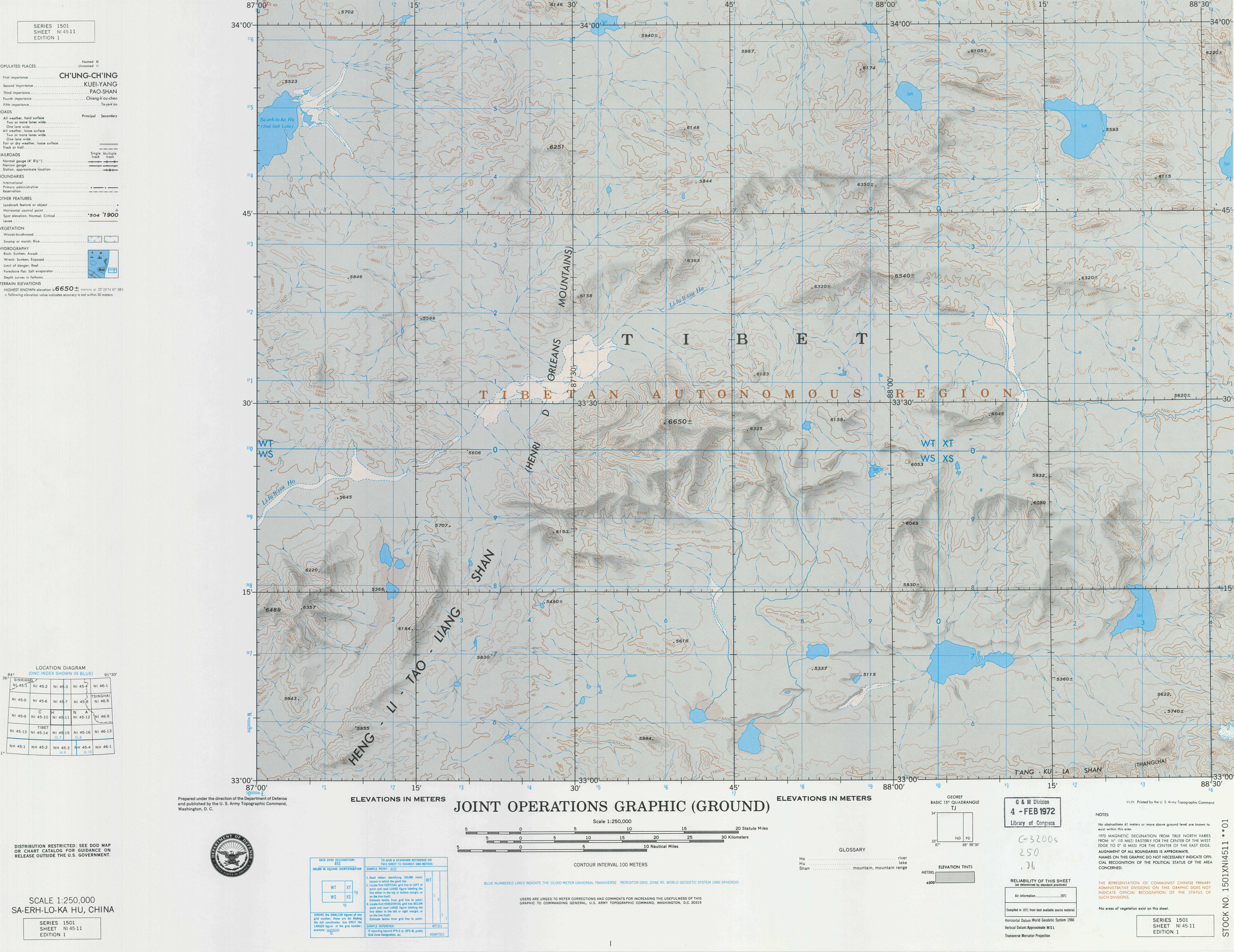

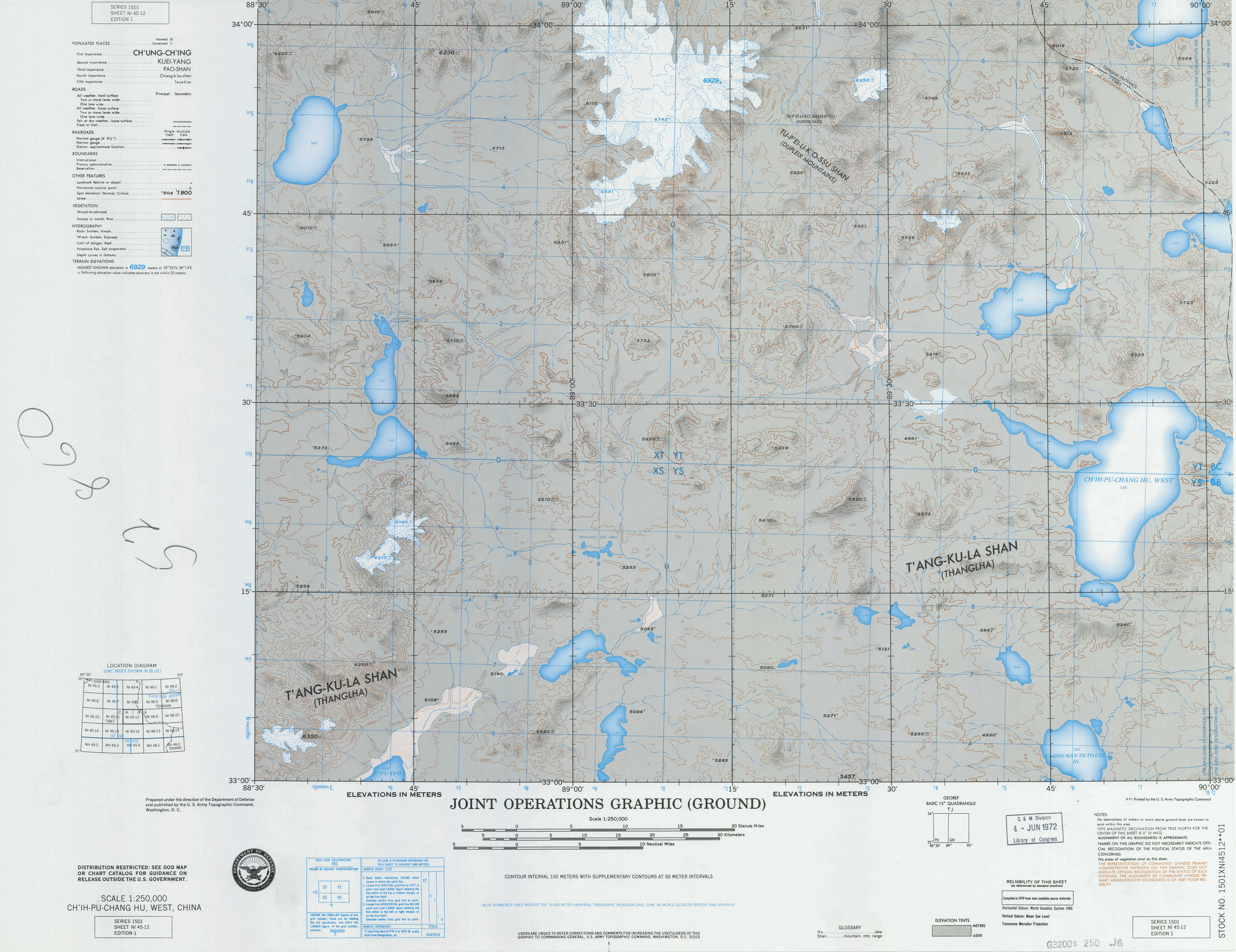

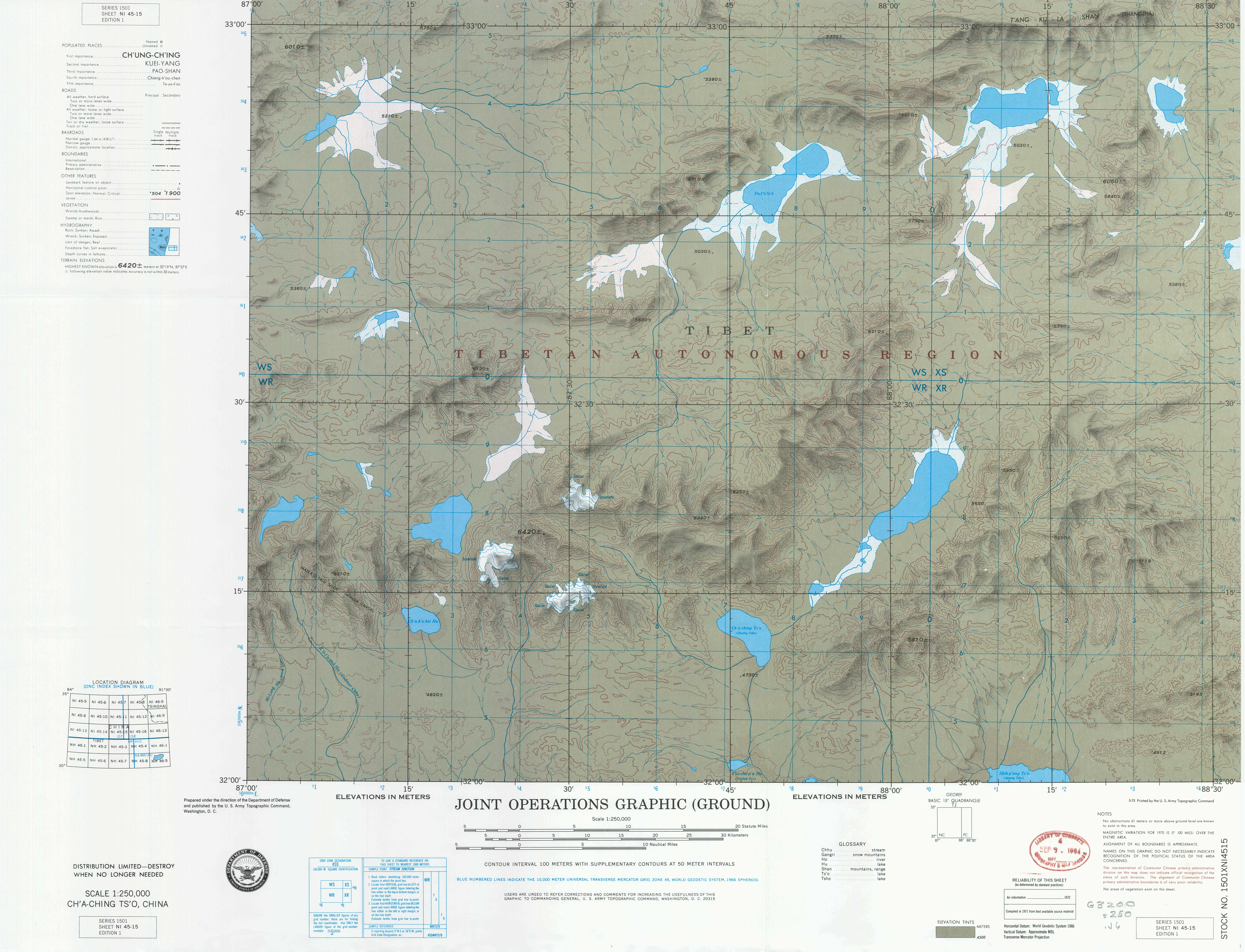

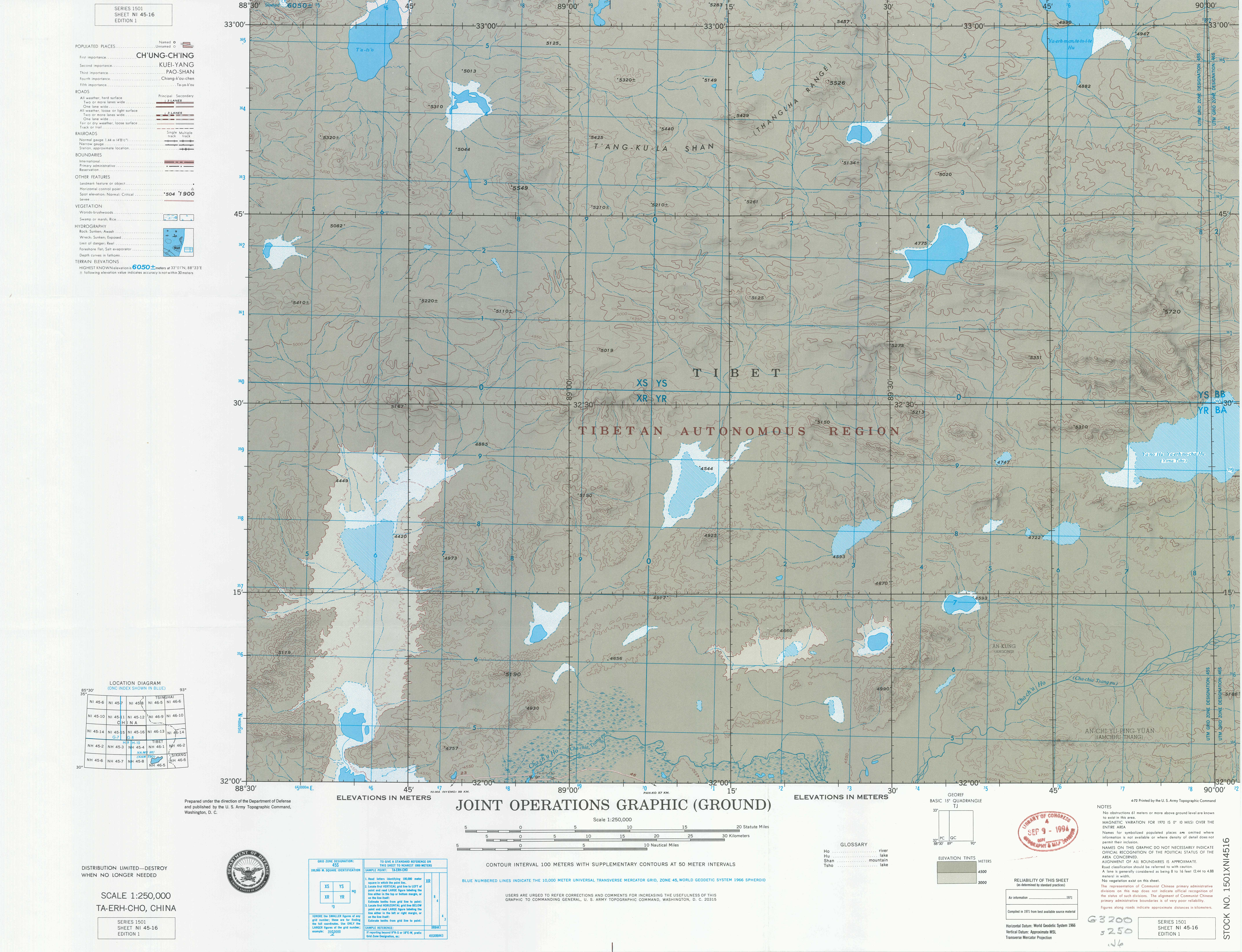

== See also ==
- Changtang
- Kunlun Mountains
- Dagze Lake
- Lake Urru
- Purog Kangri Glacier
- Puruogangri
