= Nyima County =

Nyima County 尼玛县 • ཉི་མ་རྫོང་།
- County
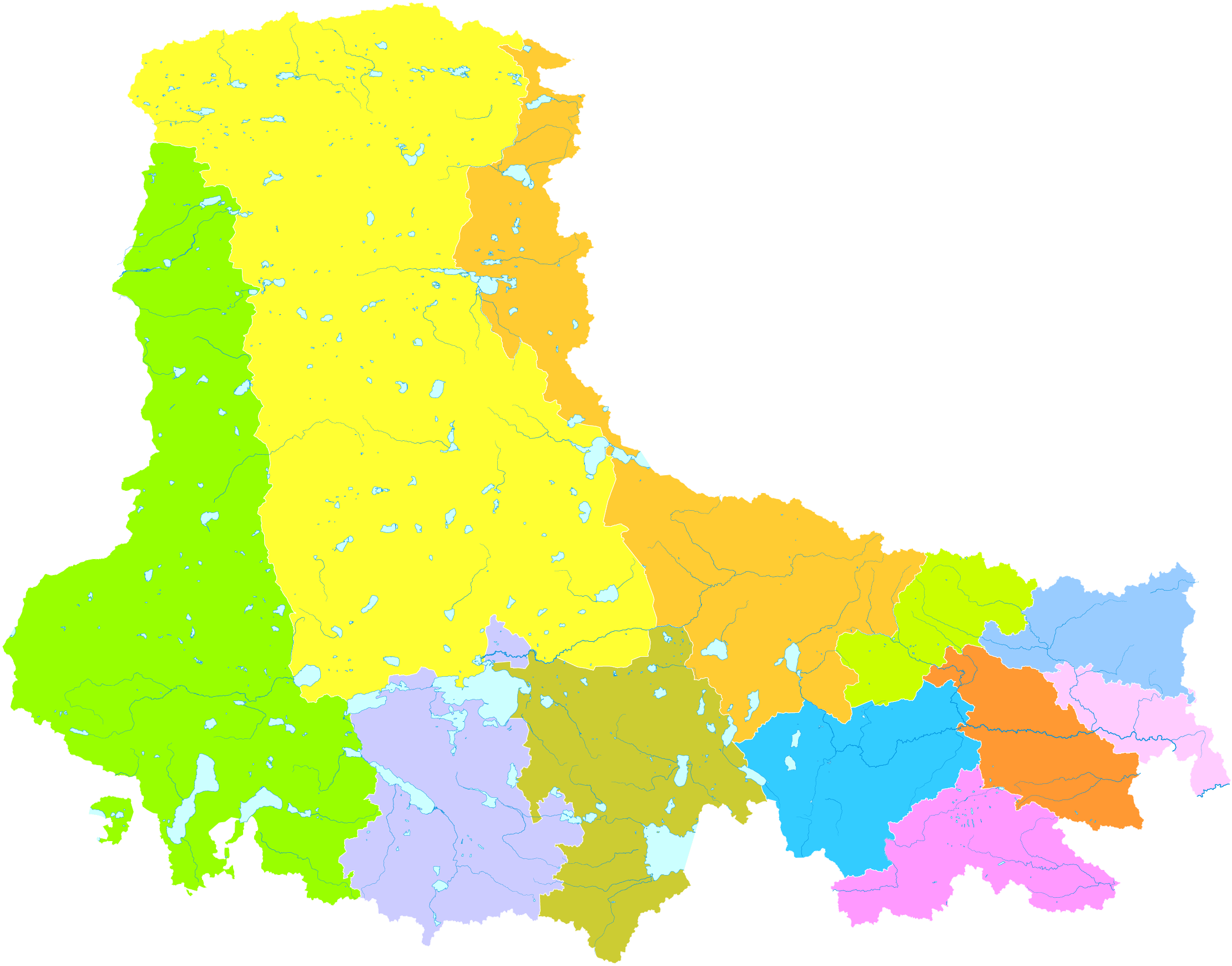
- Location of Nyima County (pale green, #9AFF00) in Nagqu

- Location of the seat in the Tibet AR Nyima (China)
- Coordinates (Nyima County government): 31°47′05″N 87°14′12″E
- Country: China
- Autonomous region: Tibet
- Prefecture-level city: Nagqu
- County seat: Nyima

Area
  - Total: 72,532.12 km^{2} (28,004.81 sq mi)

Population (2020)
  - Total: 33,006
  - Density: 0.45505/km^{2} (1.1786/sq mi)
- Time zone: UTC+8 (China Standard)
- Website: www.nqnmx.gov.cn

Nyima County

Chinese name
- Simplified Chinese: 尼玛县
- Traditional Chinese: 尼玛縣
Transcriptions
Standard Mandarin
- Hanyu Pinyin: Nímǎ Xiàn

Tibetan name
- Tibetan: ཉི་མ་རྫོང་།
Transcriptions
- Wylie: nyi ma rdzong
- Tibetan Pinyin: Nyima Zong

Nyima County (Tibetan: ཉི་མ་རྫོང་།; Chinese: 尼玛县) is the westernmost county-level division under the administration of the prefecture-level city of Nagqu, Tibet Autonomous Region, China. The northern part of the county is within the Changtang area.

With an area of 62,349 km^{2} (24,073 sq mi) and a population of 33,006 (2020), it has an average population density of approximately 0.53 people per square kilometre.

It is situated in the central-northern part of the Tibetan Plateau, between Nagqu's Shuanghu County to the east and Ngari's Gêrzê County to the west.

== Administrative divisions ==
The county is divided into 1 town and 13 townships:

Name	Chinese	Hanyu Pinyin	Tibetan	Wylie
Town
Nyima Town	尼玛镇	Nímǎ zhèn	ཉི་མ་གྲོང་རྡལ།	nyi ma grong rdal
Townships
Dro'nyin Township	卓尼乡	Zhuóní xiāng	འགྲོ་ཉིན་ཤང་།	'gro nyin shang
Targo Township	达果乡	Dáguǒ xiāng	བསྟར་སྒོ་ཤང་།	bstar sgo shang
Aso Township	阿索乡	Ãsuǒ xiāng	ཨ་གསོ་ཤང་།	a gso shang
Rongma Township	荣玛乡	Róngmǎ xiāng	རོང་མ་ཤང་།	rong ma shang
Drongtsang Township	中仓乡	Zhōngcāng xiāng	གྲོང་ཚང་ཤང་།	grong tshang shang
Latö Township	来多乡	Láiduō xiāng	ལ་སྟོད་ཤང་།	la stod shang
Sin'ya Township	申亚乡	Shēnyà xiāng	སྲིན་ཡ་ཤང་།	srin ya shang
Drowa Township	卓瓦乡	Zhuówǎ xiāng	གྲོ་བ་ཤང་།	gro ba shang
Ngochu Township	俄久乡	Éjiǔ xiāng	སྔོ་ཆུ་ཤང་།	sngo chu shang
Ombu Township	文布乡	Wénbù xiāng	ཨོམ་བུ་ཤང་།	om bu shang
Gyagok Township	甲谷乡	Jiǎgǔ xiāng	རྒྱ་སྒོག་ཤང་།	rgya sgog shang
Kyungtsang Township	军仓乡	Jūncāng xiāng	སྐྱུང་ཚང་ཤང་།	skyung tshang shang
Kyelwa Township	吉瓦乡	Jíwǎ xiāng	སྐྱེལ་བ་ཤང་།	skyel ba shang

== Gallery ==
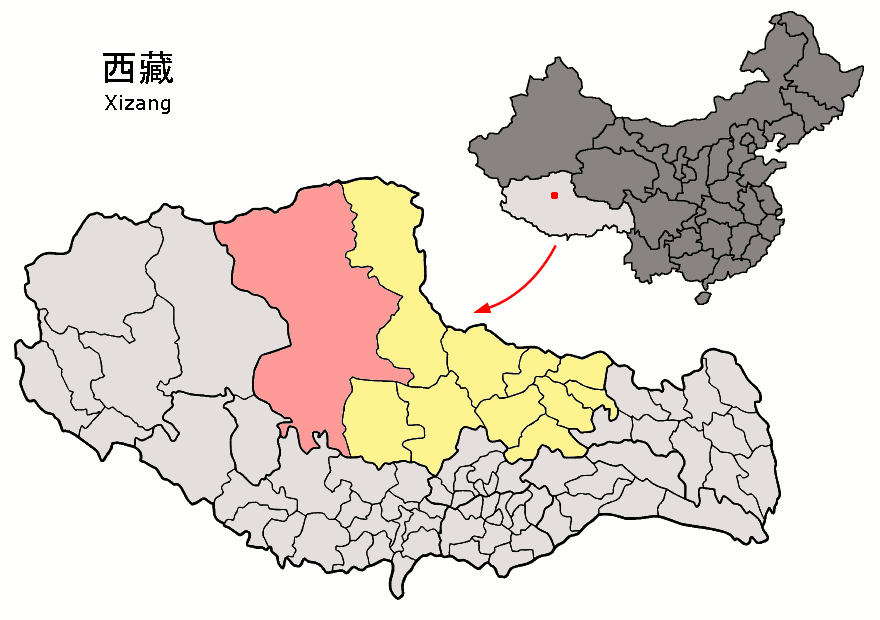
Location of Nyima County within Tibet (outdated map, shows the situation in 2007, before the establishment of Shuanghu County in 2012)

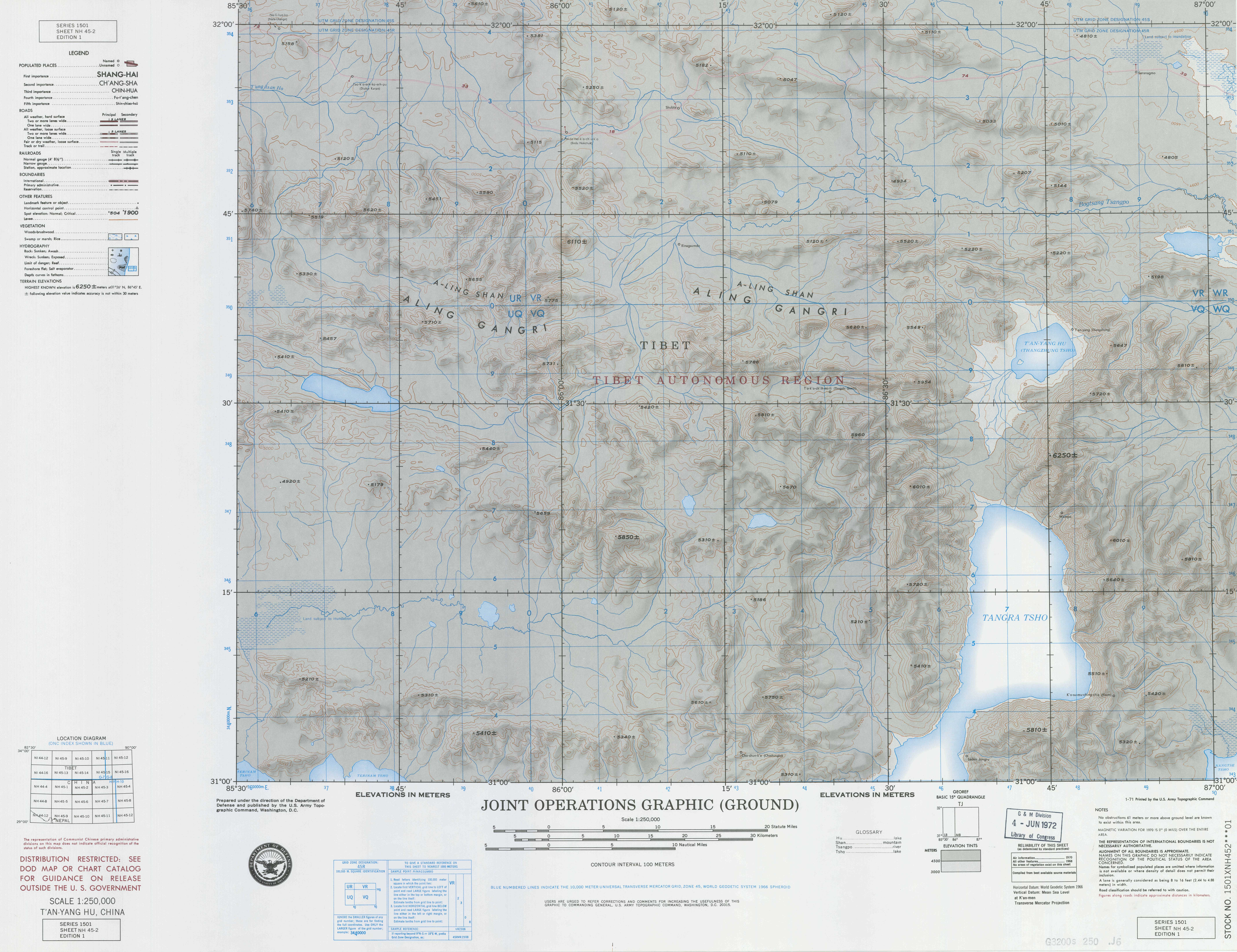
Map including part of southern Nyima County (ATC, 1970)

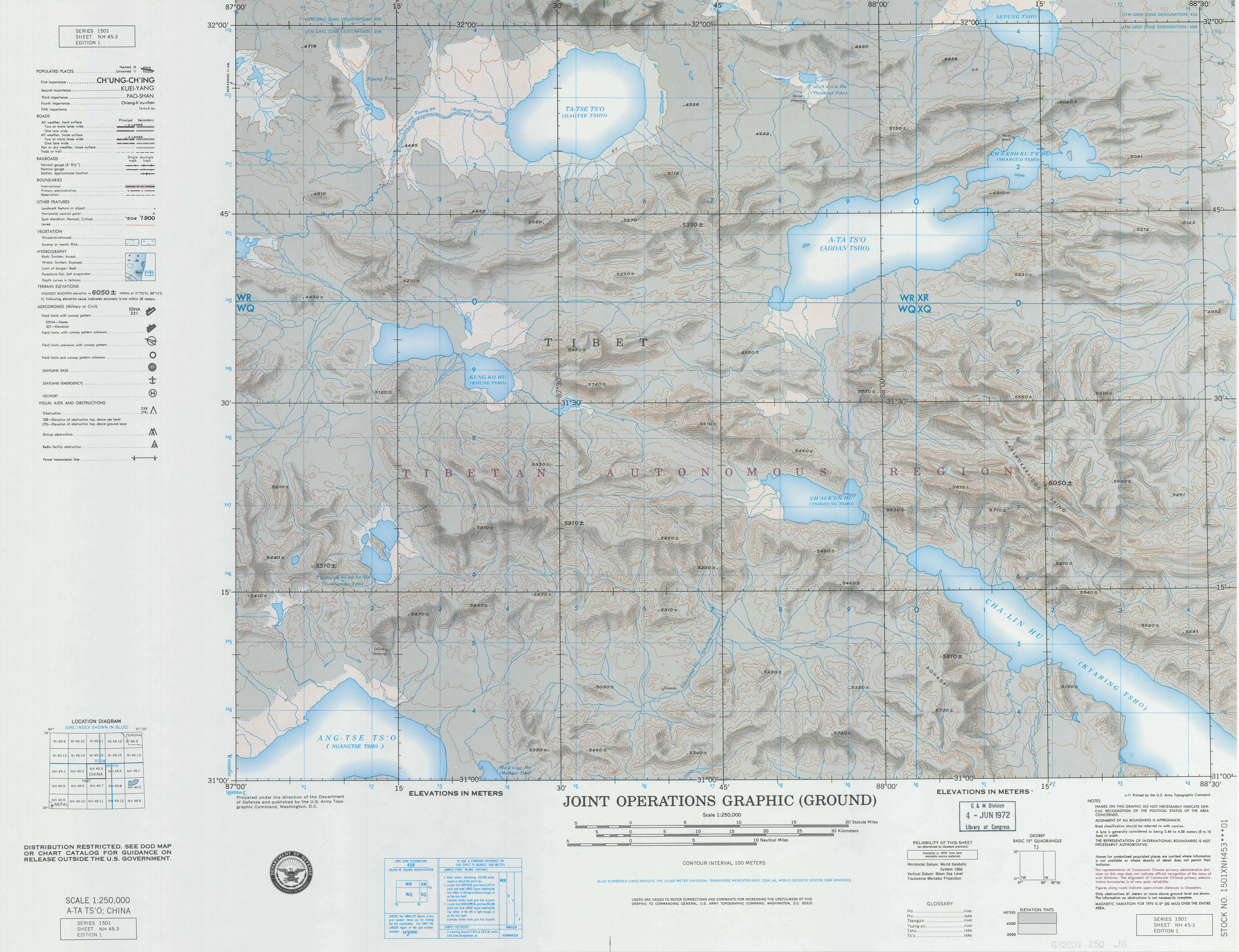
