= Lhasa Airport Expressway =

Expressway in Lhasa, Tibet, China

Coordinates: 29.357268°N 90.865725°E

Lhasa to Gonggar Airport Expressway 拉萨至贡嘎机场高速公路
- Lhasa Airport Expressway 拉萨机场高速; Lagong Expressway 拉贡高速公路
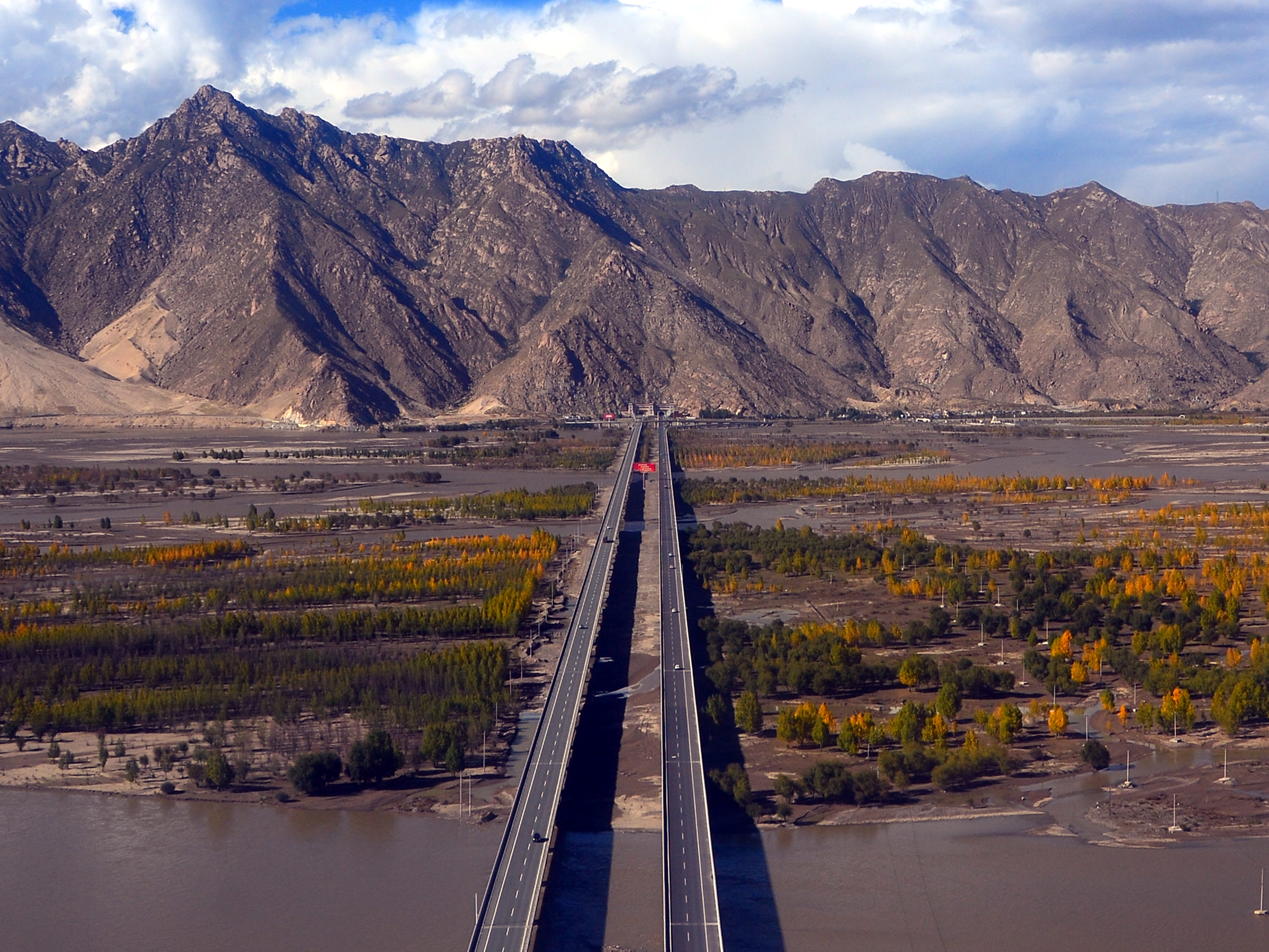

Route information
- Length: 37.8 km (23.5 mi)

Major junctions
- North end: Century Avenue, Liuwu New Area, Doilungdêqên District, Lhasa
- G318 via Lhasa River Bridge, Qüxü County, Lhasa; G4219, Gonggar County, Shannan
- South end: S101 (Youyi Road), Gonggar County, Shannan

Location
- Country: China
- Province: Tibet
- Counties: Gonggar County, Qüxü County, Doilungdêqên District

Highway system
- Transport in China

The Lhasa Airport Expressway (simplified Chinese: 拉萨机场高速; traditional Chinese: 拉薩機場高速), officially the Lhasa to Gonggar Airport Expressway (simplified Chinese: 拉萨至贡嘎机场高速公路; traditional Chinese: 拉薩至貢嘎機場高速公路), also shortened to the Lagong Expressway (simplified Chinese: 拉贡高速公路; traditional Chinese: 拉貢高速公路) is an expressway that links Lhasa Gonggar Airport to the city center of Lhasa, the capital of the autonomous region of Tibet, China. The expressway is designated as S1, however this designation is unsigned, and signposts on the expressway simply refer to it as the Airport Expressway (simplified Chinese: 机场高速; traditional Chinese: 機場高速).

== Construction ==
The expressway from Lhasa to Gonggar Airport in Shannan Prefecture is the first expressway to be built in the Tibet Autonomous Region. Construction began in April 2009. In May 2011 it was reported that the bridges and culverts were complete and tunnel construction was almost finished, with 66 percent of the road paved. The expressway was completed eleven months ahead of schedule early in July 2011 at a cost of 1.59 billion yuan. The opening ceremony was held on 17 July 2011, attended by Vice President Xi Jinping. Tibetan traditional dancers performed during the ceremony.

== Description ==
The expressway is 37.8 kilometres (23.5 mi) long and has four lanes. It provides a link from metropolitan Lhasa's downtown to Lhasa Gonggar Airport, the international airport serving the city. The expressway begins in the south end just west of the airport, and ends in the southeastern part of Doilungdêqên District, in Liuwu New Area near Lhasa railway station. The speed limit is 120 kilometres per hour (75 mph). Roadside lighting is solar powered. Travel time is shortened to 30 minutes, half the time with the previous route. Formerly travelers from the airport used the congested China National Highway 318.

The expressway connects at an interchange with the G4219 Qüxü–Nêdong Expressway just north of the Yarlung Tsangpo River. This section of the G4219 opened on 8 December 2017 for trial operations.

== Sources ==
- "430 million yuan in place for Lhasa-Gongkar airport expressway". China Tibet Online. 2010-08-02. Archived from the original on 2015-02-16.
- "Lhasa's airport expressway construction nearly completes". China Tibet Online. 2011-05-11. Archived from the original on 2011-09-21.
- Shi, Jierui (2011-07-19). "First expressway in Tibet halves time from downtown Lhasa to airport". Archived from the original on 2015-02-16.
- "Tibet Completes First Expressway Connecting Lhasa to Airport". Asia Briefing Ltd. 2011-07-18.
- "Vice President Inaugurates Airport Expressway in Lhasa". China Radio International. 2011-07-17. Archived from the original on February 17, 2015.
- "National Highway 349 Tsetang to Gonggar Airport Highway begins trial operations. ([西藏]国道349线泽当至贡嘎机场高等级公路通车试运营)". Ministry of Transport of the People's Republic of China. 2017-12-08. (in Chinese)
