= Lhasa–Nyingchi railway =

Overview
- Other name: Lalin Line
- Native name: 拉林铁路
- Status: Operational
- Owner: China Railway
- Locale: Tibet Autonomous Region, China
- Termini: Lhasa; Nyingchi
- Stations: 34

Service
- Type: Higher-speed rail
- Operator(s): China Railway Qingzang Group
- Rolling stock: China Railway CR200J

History
- Opened: 25 June 2021

Technical
- Line length: 435.48 km (270.59 mi)
- Number of tracks: 1
- Track gauge: 1,435 mm (4 ft 8 1/2 in) standard gauge
- Electrification: 25 kV 50 Hz AC overhead line
- Operating speed: 160 km/h (99 mph)

Chinese name
- Simplified Chinese: 拉林铁路
- Traditional Chinese: 拉林鐵路
Transcriptions
Standard Mandarin
- Hanyu Pinyin: Lā lín Tiělù

Lalin Line
- Simplified Chinese: 拉林线
- Traditional Chinese: 拉林線
Transcriptions
Standard Mandarin
- Hanyu Pinyin: Lā lín Xiàn

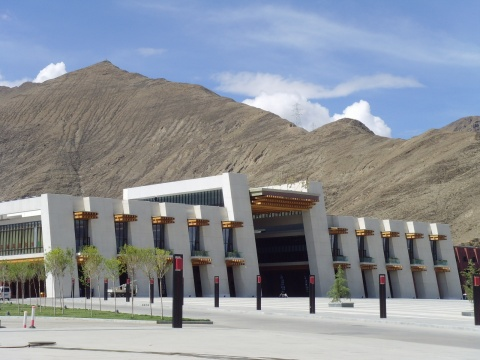
Lhasa station

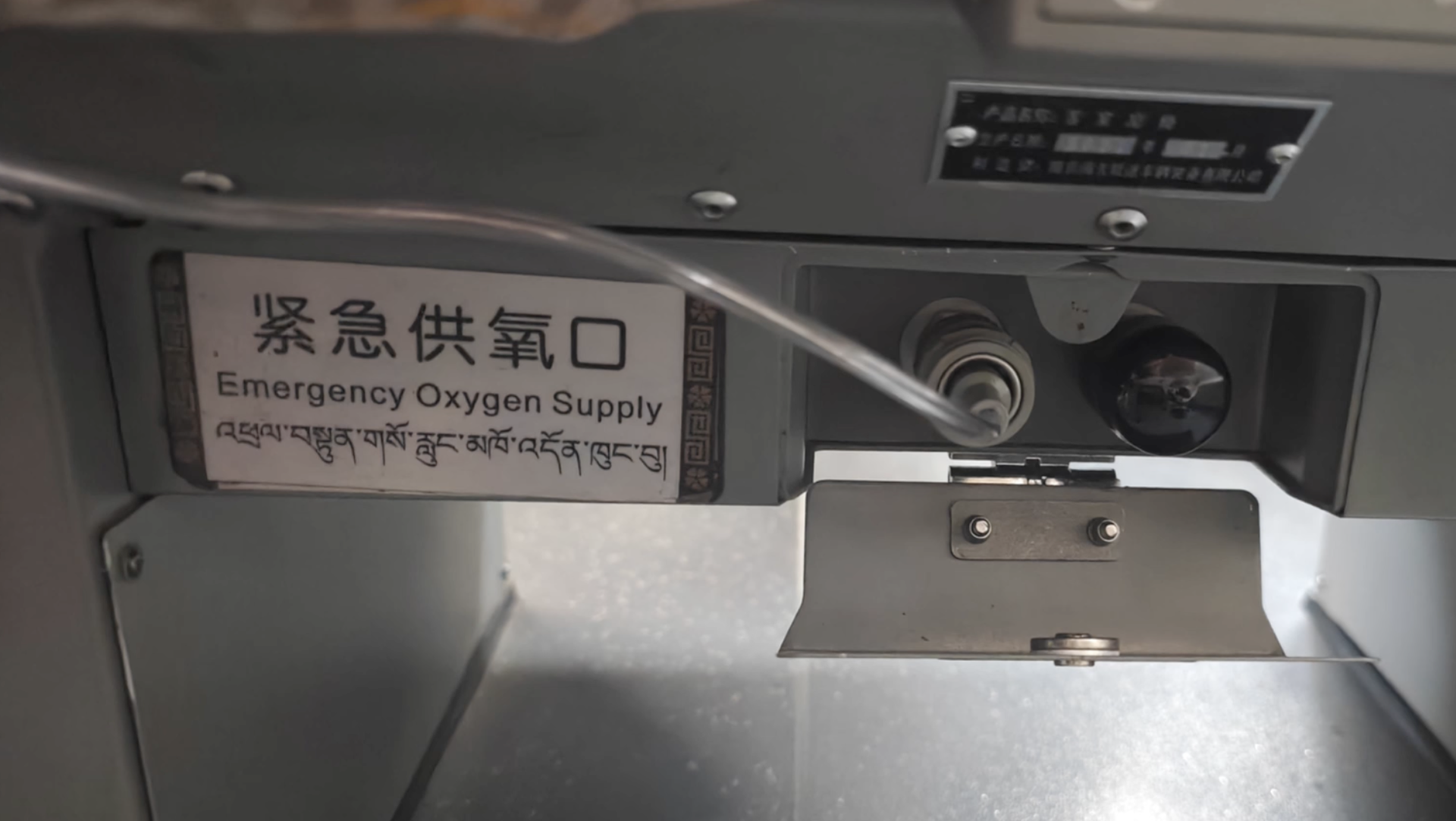
Emergency oxygen supply holes are available under the seats on the trains due to the high altitudes of Lhasa-Nyingchi Railway.

The Lhasa–Nyingchi railway (Chinese: 拉林铁路) also known as the Lalin Line (Chinese: 拉林线), is a single-track railway across the southeast Tibet, China, linking Lhasa and Nyingchi. It has a length of 435.48 kilometres (270.59 mi) and a designed speed of 160 kilometres (99 mi) per hour. The trains have been equipped with oxygen supply equipment. There are currently nine stations in the cities of Lhasa, Shannan, and Nyingchi that can handle both passengers and freight transportation.

== Construction ==
Located in a valley between Gangdis and Himalayas in southeast Tibet, over 90% of the tracks are at an elevation of more than 3,000 metres (9,800 ft) above sea level. The railway crosses the Yarlung Tsangpo River 16 times and has 47 tunnels and 121 bridges. It is part of the under-construction Sichuan–Tibet railway that will connect Lhasa and Chengdu, capital of the neighboring Sichuan province. Lhasa-Nyingchi railway is the first fully-electrified railway in Tibet region. The rolling stock is the China Railway CR200J Fuxing series powered by both electronic motors and internal combustion engines, marking the complete coverage of Fuxing series to all provincial-level regions in China. The newly opened train route provides Nyingchi with access to railway services for the first time in history.

== History ==
On 4 November 2014, the National Development and Reform Commission approved the construction of Lhasa–Nyingchi railway. The Sangzhuling Tunnel (桑珠岭隧道) started engineering works on 19 December 2014. Construction began on 28 June 2015, and the track-laying work was completed by the end of 2020.

On 25 June 2021, the railway began operation, with the first train leaving Lhasa for Nyingchi at 10.30 am. Compared with roads, the railway reduces the travel time from Lhasa to Nyingchi from 5 hours to 3.5 hours, and cuts the travel time from Shannan to Nyingchi from 6 hours to more than 2 hours.

== Rolling stock ==
160 km/h services use the China Railway CR200J trainsets. CR200J Plateau variant will serve the railway, and it's a type of bi-mode locomotive specifically designed for plateau operations. 31 sets of train in 12 car configuration is in service. A combination of diffusion and distributed oxygen systems are installed to help alleviate altitude sickness for passengers on the trip.

== Stations ==
English name	Tibetan name	Chinese name	Connections	Location		Distance (km)
Lhasa station	ལྷ་ས་	拉萨站	Qinghai–Tibet railway	Doilungdêqên District	Lhasa	0.00
Lhasa South station		拉萨南站		Doilungdêqên District	Lhasa	
Baide station		白德站		Qüxü County	Lhasa	
Xierong station		协荣站	Lhasa–Xigazê railway	Qüxü County	Lhasa	
Changguo station		昌果站		Gonggar County	Shannan	
Gonggar station	གོང་དཀར་་	贡嘎站		Gonggar County	Shannan	
Jiedexiu station		杰德秀站		Gonggar County	Shannan	
Zhanang station	གྲ་ནང་	扎囊站		Zhanang County	Shannan	
Zhaqi station		扎其站		Zhanang County	Shannan	
Jinlu station		金鲁站		Nêdong District	Shannan	
Jiacun station		甲村站		Nêdong District	Shannan	
Tsetang station	རྩེ་ཐང།	泽当站		Nêdong District	Shannan	
Mingze station		明则站		Nêdong District	Shannan	
Sangri station	ཟངས་རི་	桑日站		Sangri County	Shannan	
Baizhen station		拜珍站		Sangri County	Shannan	
Woka station		沃卡站		Sangri County	Shannan	
Bayu station		巴玉站		Sangri County	Shannan	
Zangmu station		藏木站		Gyaca County	Shannan	
Gyaca station	རྒྱ་ཚ་	加查站		Gyaca County	Shannan	
Linda station		林达站		Gyaca County	Shannan	
Redang station		热当站		Gyaca County	Shannan	
Chongkang station		冲康站		Gyaca County	Shannan	
Nang County station	སྣང་རྫོང་།	朗县站		Nang County	Nyingchi	
Dongga station		洞嘎站		Nang County	Nyingchi	
Remi station		热米站		Nang County	Nyingchi	
Jiage station		甲格站		Mainling County	Nyingchi	
Xiajue station		下觉站		Mainling County	Nyingchi	
Benzhong station		奔中站		Mainling County	Nyingchi	
Wolong station		卧龙站		Mainling County	Nyingchi	
Lilong station		里龙站		Mainling County	Nyingchi	
Kangsha station		康莎站		Mainling County	Nyingchi	
Zharao station		扎绕站		Mainling County	Nyingchi	
Mainling station	སྨན་གླིང་	米林站		Mainling County	Nyingchi	
Xuega station		雪嘎站		Mainling County	Nyingchi	
Gangga station		岗嘎站		Mainling County	Nyingchi	
Zhongshaba station		中沙坝站		Mainling County	Nyingchi	
Nyingchi station	ཉིང་ཁྲི་ས་ཁུལ་	林芝站	Ya'an–Nyingchi segment	Bayi District	Nyingchi	435.48

== See also ==
- Sichuan–Tibet railway
