= Chumaerhe railway station =

Railway station in China

Chumaerhe railway station, also known as Chumar River railway station, (Chinese: 楚玛尔河站) is an unstaffed sightseeing railway station on the Qinghai–Tibet Railway, located at the mouth of the Chumar River in the Hoh Xil nature reserve. The station is 4,495 metres (14,747 ft) above sea level, and opened on July 1, 2006.

== See also ==
- Qinghai–Tibet Railway
- List of stations on Qinghai–Tibet railway

Preceding station	China Railway	Following station
Budongquan towards Xining	Qinghai–Tibet railway	Wudaoliang towards Lhasa
