= Wudaoliang railway station =

Railway station in China

Coordinates: 35°11′41″N 93°04′43″E

Wudaoliang railway station (Chinese: 五道梁站; pinyin: Wǔdàoliáng Zhàn) is a crossing loop on the China Railway line to Lhasa in Tibet.

== Climate ==
Wudaoliang has a tundra climate (Köppen climate classification ET) with long, frigid, very dry winters and short, cool, less dry summers.

Climate data for Wudaoliang, elevation 4,612 m (15,131 ft), (1991–2020 normals, extremes 1981–present)
Month	Jan	Feb	Mar	Apr	May	Jun	Jul	Aug	Sep	Oct	Nov	Dec	Year
Record high °C (°F)	2.2 (36.0)	6.5 (43.7)	10.2 (50.4)	15.1 (59.2)	18.5 (65.3)	21.2 (70.2)	22.8 (73.0)	21.7 (71.1)	18.3 (64.9)	14.3 (57.7)	7.1 (44.8)	4.3 (39.7)	22.8 (73.0)
Mean daily maximum °C (°F)	−7.9 (17.8)	−5.2 (22.6)	−1.1 (30.0)	3.3 (37.9)	7.0 (44.6)	10.1 (50.2)	12.9 (55.2)	12.5 (54.5)	8.9 (48.0)	2.5 (36.5)	−2.6 (27.3)	−6.3 (20.7)	2.8 (37.1)
Daily mean °C (°F)	−15.9 (3.4)	−13.4 (7.9)	−9.6 (14.7)	−4.6 (23.7)	−0.1 (31.8)	3.5 (38.3)	6.4 (43.5)	6.0 (42.8)	2.3 (36.1)	−4.3 (24.3)	−10.8 (12.6)	−14.6 (5.7)	−4.6 (23.7)
Mean daily minimum °C (°F)	−22.4 (−8.3)	−20.5 (−4.9)	−16.9 (1.6)	−11.3 (11.7)	−5.6 (21.9)	−1.2 (29.8)	1.5 (34.7)	1.1 (34.0)	−1.9 (28.6)	−9.1 (15.6)	−16.9 (1.6)	−20.9 (−5.6)	−10.3 (13.4)
Record low °C (°F)	−37.7 (−35.9)	−35.5 (−31.9)	−31.3 (−24.3)	−23.4 (−10.1)	−20.1 (−4.2)	−11.5 (11.3)	−7.9 (17.8)	−9.3 (15.3)	−15.1 (4.8)	−26.4 (−15.5)	−28.5 (−19.3)	−31.7 (−25.1)	−37.7 (−35.9)
Average precipitation mm (inches)	1.5 (0.06)	2.2 (0.09)	4.6 (0.18)	8.6 (0.34)	29.4 (1.16)	61.5 (2.42)	85.9 (3.38)	82.3 (3.24)	48.1 (1.89)	9.2 (0.36)	1.6 (0.06)	1.2 (0.05)	336.1 (13.23)
Average precipitation days (≥ 0.1 mm)	3.6	3.6	5.9	6.8	12.7	18.1	18.1	16.9	16.7	7.1	2.2	2.0	113.7
Average snowy days	7.6	8.6	10.6	11.8	18.0	18.0	7.5	7.2	15.0	11.1	4.4	5.0	124.8
Average relative humidity (%)	46	43	44	48	58	69	69	69	72	60	46	43	56
Mean monthly sunshine hours	218.1	203.2	235.4	248.9	263.8	218.1	230.0	223.4	214.9	257.6	238.8	232.6	2,784.8
Percentage possible sunshine	69	65	63	63	61	50	52	54	59	75	78	77	64
Source: China Meteorological Administration

== Station layout ==
The station has a crossing loop and a few sidings shuntable in the Lhasa-bound direction.

A subway at the Lhasa end is provided for road traffic, rather than a level crossing.

Preceding station	China Railway	Following station
Chumaerhe towards Xining	Qinghai–Tibet railway	Xiushuihe towards Lhasa
