= Tsurphu Monastery =

Tibetan Buddhist gompa in Lhasa, Tibet, China

- Tibetan transcription(s); Tibetan: མཚུར་ཕུ་དགོན་པ; Wylie transliteration: mtshur phu dgon pa Pronunciation in IPA: [[tsʰuːpʰu]] THL: Tsurphu Gömpa; Chinese transcription(s); Simplified: 楚布寺; Pinyin: Chǔbù Sì
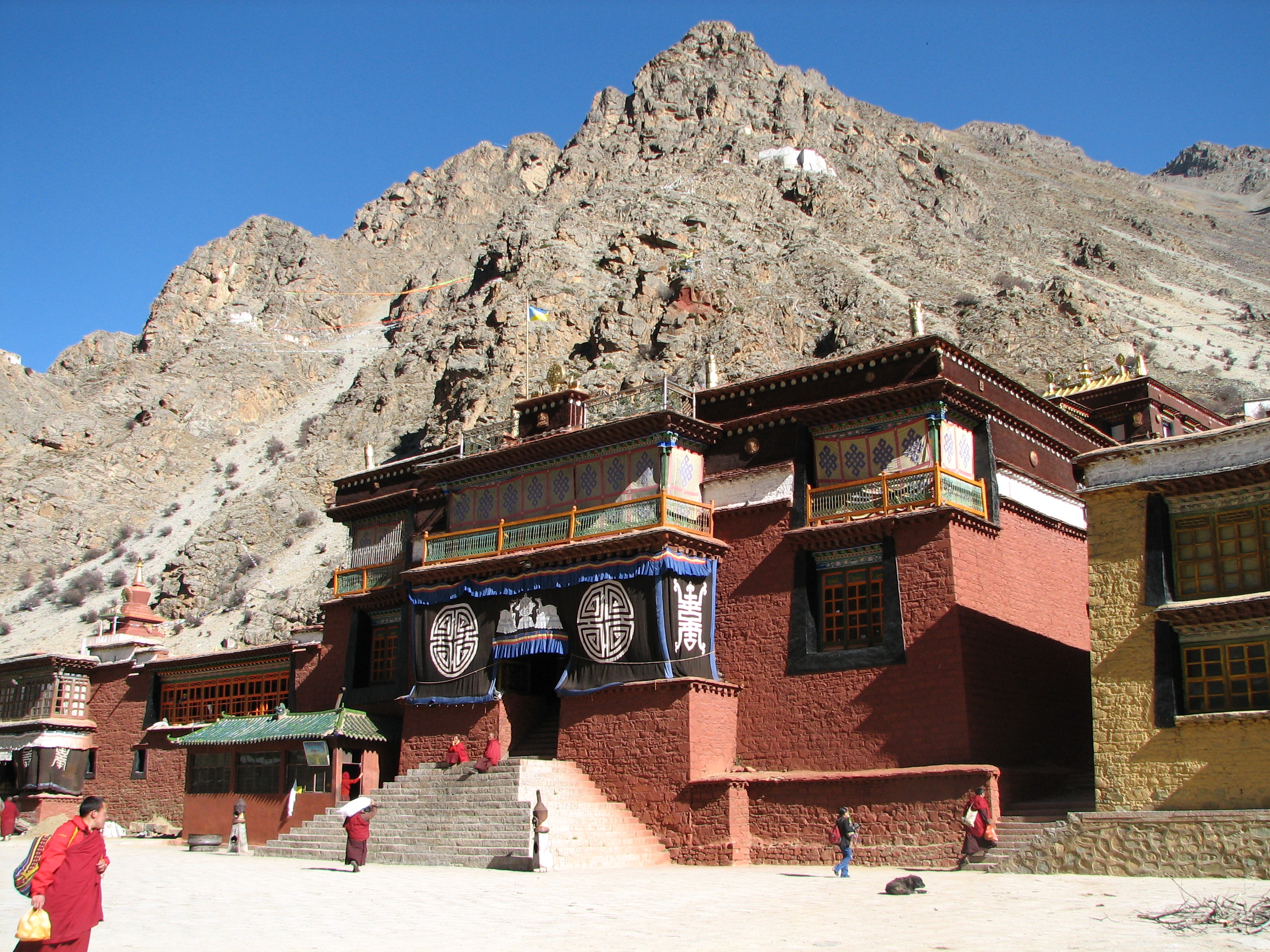
- Tsurphu Monastery

- Location within Tibet Autonomous Region

Religion
- Affiliation: Tibetan Buddhism
- Sect: Kagyu

Location
- Location: Gurum, Doilungdêqên District, Lhasa, Tibet Autonomous Region
- Country: China
- Interactive map of Tsurphu Monastery
- Coordinates: 29°43′36″N 90°34′30″E

Architecture
- Founder: Düsum Khyenpa, 1st Karmapa Lama
- Established: 1159; 867 years ago

Tsurphu Monastery (Tibetan: མཚུར་ཕུ་དགོན་པ) or Tölung Tsurphu (Tibetan: སྟོད་ལུང་མཚུར་ཕུ, "Tsurphu of Tölong") is a gompa which serves as the traditional seat of the Karmapa, the head of the Karma Kagyu lineage of Tibetan Buddhism. It is located in Gurum in Doilungdêqên District, Tibet Autonomous Region, China, 70 kilometres (43 mi) from Lhasa.

The monastery is about 4,300 metres (14,100 ft) above sea level. It was built in the middle of the valley facing south with high mountains surrounding the complex.

Tsurphu is a 300-square-meter (3,200 sq ft) complex with walls up to 4 meters (13 ft) thick. The gompa, the traditional seat of the Karmapa lamas, is about 28 kilometres (17 mi) up the Dowo Lung Valley on the north side of the river. The original walls of the main building were up to 4 meters thick and 300 meters on each side (90,000 square meters or 970,000 square feet). The monks' residences were on the eastern side.

== History ==
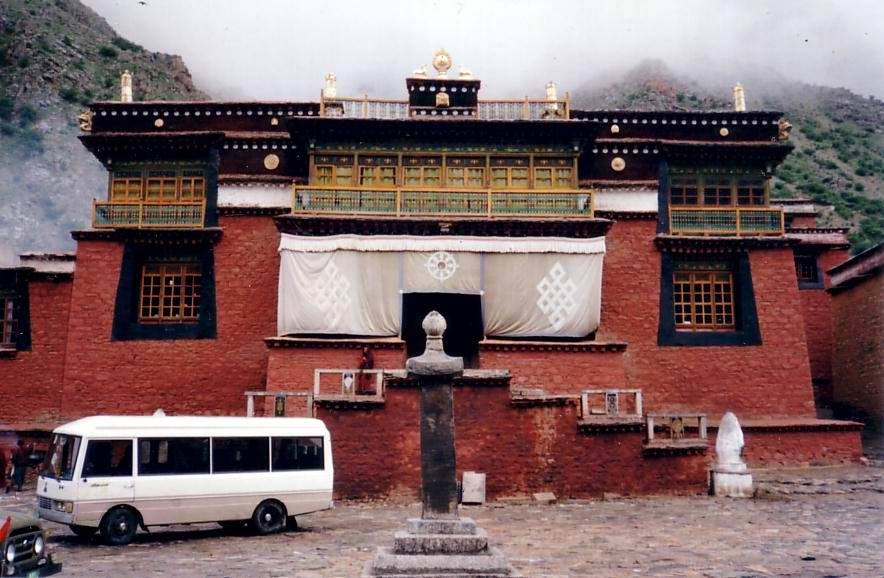
Reconstructed Tsurphu Monastery, 1993

Tsurphu was founded by Düsum Khyenpa, 1st Karmapa Lama (1110-1193) in 1159, after he visited the site and laid the foundation for an establishment of a seat there by making offerings to the local protectors, the dharmapalas and territorial divinities (Wylie: yul lha). In 1189 he revisited the site and founded his main seat there. The monastery grew to hold 1000 monks.

The complex was totally destroyed in 1966 during the Cultural Revolution. Rangjung Rigpe Dorje, 16th Karmapa, began to rebuild it in 1980; he died in 1981.

Following the recognition of Ogyen Trinley Dorje (born 1985) as the 17th Karmapa by the Tai Situpa, the Dalai Lama and China's governmental offices, he was enthroned at Tsurphu and resided there until he escaped from Tibet to India in 2000.

=== Branch monastery ===
A Yelpa Kagyu monastery, Jang Tana, in Nangchen, Kham, is considered a branch monastery of Tsurpu. It was founded by Yelpa Yeshe Tsek in 1068.

=== Variant names ===
Variant names for the monastery include: Tsurphu, 楚布寺, mtshur mdo bo lung dgon, 祖普寺, Okmin Tsurpu, 'og min mtshur phu.

== Pilgrims ==
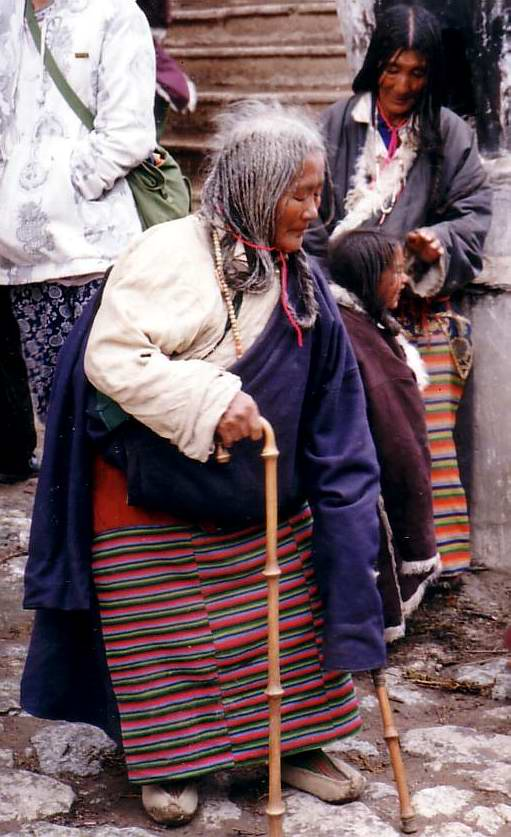
Elderly pilgrim, Tsurphu Gompa, 1993

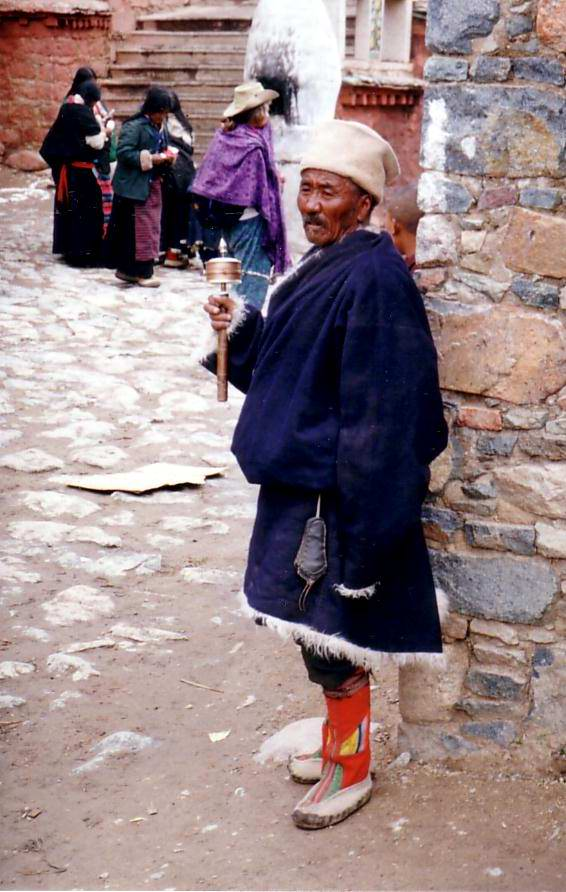
Pilgrims, Tsurphu Gompa, 1993

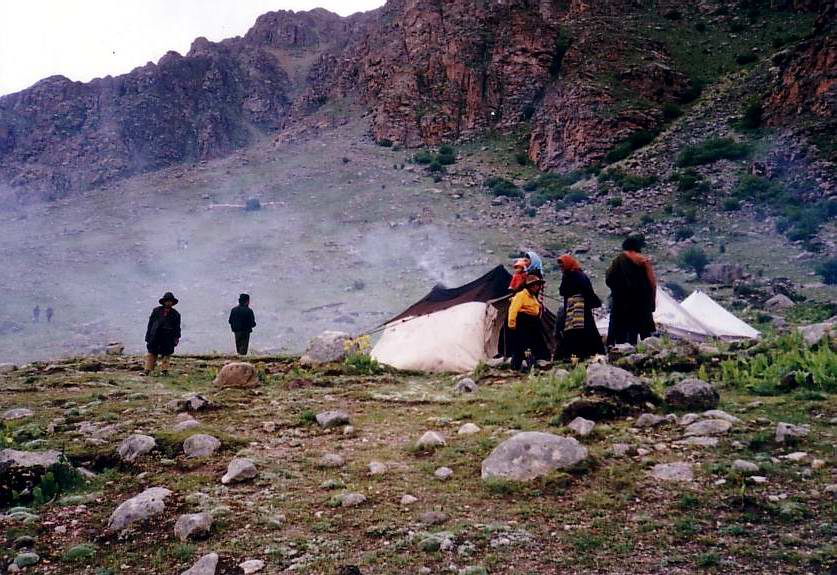
Nomad camp above Tsurphu Gompa, 1993. Smoke is from juniper burning for ceremony.

== Sources ==
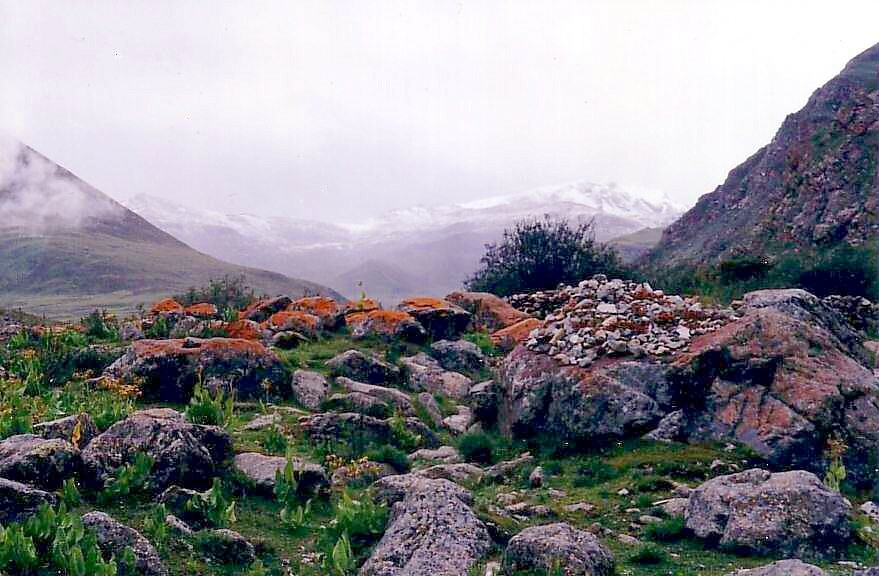
Dowo Lung Valley, above Tsurphu Gompa

- Berzin, Alexander. "A Brief History of Tsurpu Monastery".
- Dowman, Keith. The Power-places of Central Tibet: The Pilgrim's Guide. 1988. Routledge & Kegan Paul. London. ISBN 0-7102-1370-0
- Martin, Michele. Music in the Sky: The Life, Art & Teachings of the 17th Karmapa, Ogyen Trinley Dorje. 2003. Snow Lion Publications. Reprint: New Age Books, New Delhi, 2004. ISBN 81-7822-193-4.
