= Lieshan Cemetery =

Cemetery in Tibet, China

Coordinates: 28°58′56″N 93°21′08″E

Lieshan Cemetery (Chinese: 烈山墓地), located in Leng Village, Jindong Township, Nang County, Nyingchi City, Tibet Autonomous Region, China, dates back to the Tibetan Empire.

== Architecture ==
Lieshan Cemetery is situated on a hillside east of Leng Village, Jindong Township, in Lang County. Covering an area of approximately 500,000 square meters, archaeological excavations have uncovered 184 sealed tombs, densely clustered in the eastern and western sections of the site. The eastern section contains 162 tombs, while the western section has 22. Among these, 23 large tombs cover over 700 square meters each, 74 medium-sized tombs range from 90 to 700 square meters, and 56 small tombs are less than 90 square meters. The largest tomb, with a side length of 66 meters and a maximum height of 14 meters, is particularly notable. The tombs vary in shape, including trapezoidal, circular, square, composite, and other designs, and were constructed using traditional Tibetan stone and wood rammed earth techniques. The cemetery also contains the remains of buildings, ritual sites, and stone monuments.

The scale and number of tombs at Lieshan Cemetery are exceptional within the Tibet Autonomous Region, suggesting that it may have been the burial ground for elites of the Tibetan Empire.
