= Tibet Skyway =

- Company type: Public; partly state-owned
- Founded: 1999; 27 years ago

Tibet Skyway (Chinese: 西藏天路, 西藏天路股份有限公司) officially established on March 29, 1999, is a publicly traded corporation specializing in roadway engineering and infrastructure construction in Tibet. The Shanghai Stock Exchange officially listed the company's shares on January 16, 2001. The stock designation is "Tibet Skyway" (SSE: 600326).

== History ==
Tibet Engineering Company, in collaboration with Tibet Industrial Company, Tibet Layuan Company, Tibet Automobile Trade Company, and Tibet Golmud Company, established the company on March 29, 1999. The company's primary focus is on infrastructure construction, namely highway engineering, predominantly involving the construction of highways and bridges in the Tibet Autonomous Region. It has executed the building of the Qinghai-Tibet Highway, Sichuan-Tibet Highway, China-Nepal Highway, and other national and significant trunk highways in the region, as well as large-scale highway bridges like Qushui, Gonggar, and Touxia. The projects encompass the reconstruction of the Lhasa to Gongga Airport Highway, the Lhasa Liuwu Bridge, the Gangxiu No.1 Special Bridge of the Qinghai-Tibet Railway, Gangxiu Station, and the Underwater Graben Project; the reconstruction and expansion of Jinzhu West Road; and the environmental enhancement project surrounding the Jokhang in Lhasa, among others. In 2007, the business executed a major strategic restructuring and assumed control of the exploration and development of the Chongjiang Copper Mine.
