= Shigatse railway station =

Railway station in Tibet, China

Xigazê railway station 日喀则站
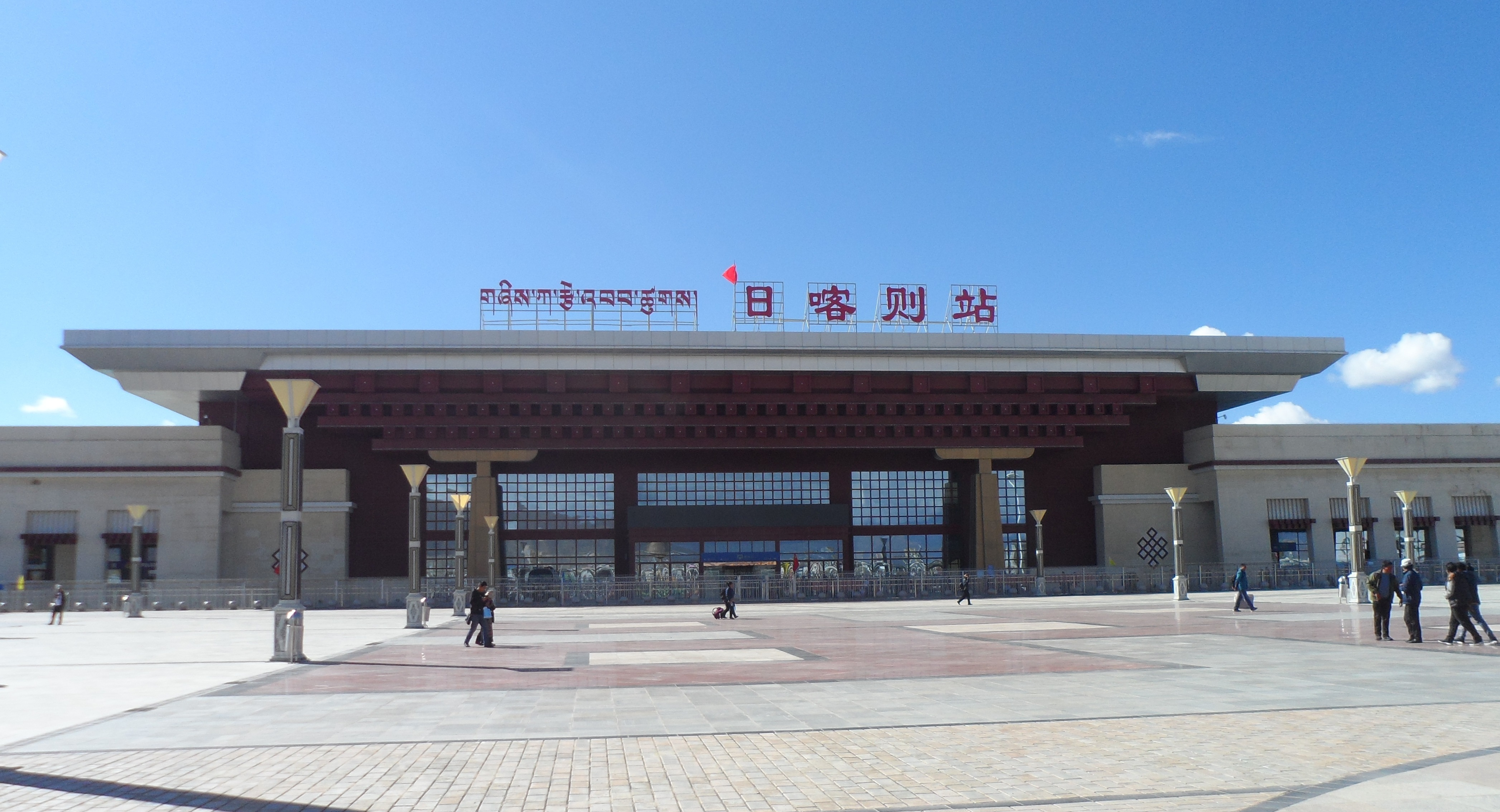

General information
- Location: Shigatse, Tibet; China
- Coordinates: 29°13′24″N 88°54′43″E
- Operated by: China Railway Corporation; Qinghai-Tibet Railway Group
- Line: Lhasa–Shigatse Railway
- Platforms: 3
- Connections: Bus terminal

History
- Opened: 16 August 2014
Location

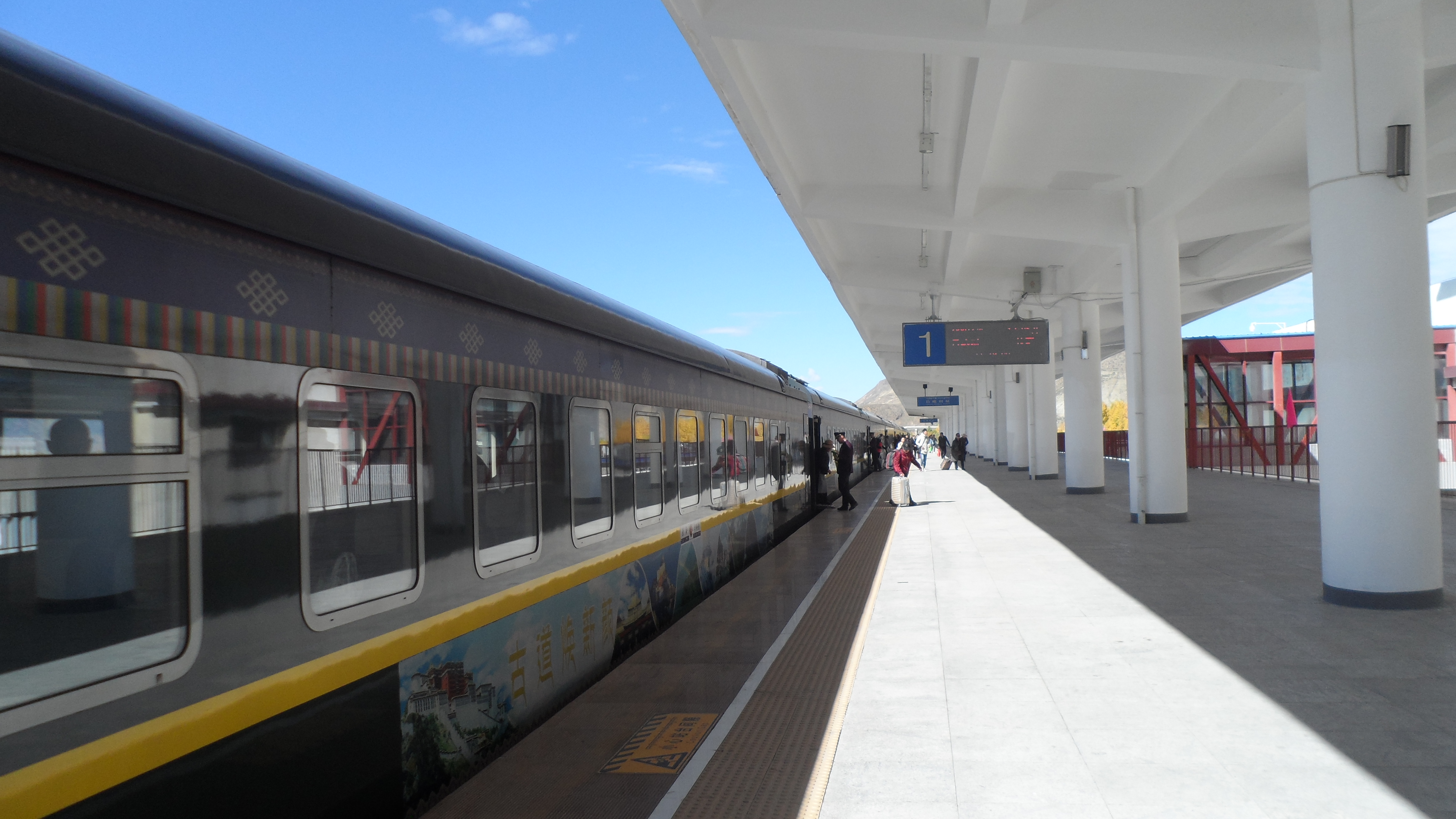
Shigatse railway station

Shigatse railway station (simplified Chinese: 日喀则站; traditional Chinese: 日喀則站; pinyin: Rìkāzé zhàn), officially Xigazê, is a railway station in Shigatse, Tibet Autonomous Region, China. It lies in Jiacuoxiong Township, Samzhubzê District. The station officially opened for operations on 16 August 2014.

== Track layout ==
The Shigatse passenger railway station is large compared to current needs as it has five tracks serving two island platforms and a single side platform. Islands reserved for expansion include international (or at least to the border) plans for China–India railway link to Yadong as well as a China–Nepal railway link to Gyirong and at some point, Kathmandu.

== See also ==
- Shigatse
- Lari railway

Scenery along the Lhasa-Shigatse Railway

Preceding station	China Railway	Following station
Kadui towards Lhasa	Lhasa–Xigazê railway	Terminus
