= Donggar Subdistrict =

Donggar
- Subdistrict
- གདོང་དཀར་

Tibetan transcription(s)
  - Tibetan: གདོང་དཀར་

Chinese transcription(s)
  - Simplified: 东嘎街道
- Location within Tibet
- Coordinates: 29.6495°N 90.994°E
- Country: China
- Province: Tibet Autonomous Region
- Prefecture: Lhasa Prefecture
- District: Doilungdêqên District

Area
  - Subdistrict: 85 km^{2} (33 sq mi)

Population
  - Subdistrict: 9,359
  - Metro: 4,000
- Time zone: UTC+8 (CST)

Donggar (Tibetan: གདོང་དཀར་; Chinese: 东嘎街道) is a subdistrict in Doilungdêqên District in the Tibet Autonomous Region of China, northwest of Lhasa. It lies at an altitude of 3,828 metres (12,562 feet). The subdistrict has a population of about 4,000 people with 9,359 people in the township.

It lies approximately 17.8 miles south of Dobjoi and is near Cha'gyungoinba.

In 1962 Donggar became an administrative township, covering an area of 85 square kilometers. Donggar Township has three village committees and 17 villages. The economy is dominated by agriculture, animal husbandry with an area of 576 hectares (1,420 acres) of cultivated land, including barley, wheat, rapeseed and vegetables. Livestock breeding includes yaks, sheep, goats, etc. China National Highway 318 runs through this territory.

== See also ==
- List of towns and villages in Tibet
