= Mar Township =

Township in China

Coordinates: 29°50′N 90°45′E

Marqu (Tibetan: དམར་, Chinese: 马乡) is a township in Doilungdêqên District in the Tibet Autonomous Region of China. The village has embarked on a journey to teach reading to the villagers. Since the farming community now relies heavily on machine harvesting, there is more time to develop reading skills and a healthy lifestyle.

== See also ==
- List of towns and villages in Tibet
