= Liuwu Subdistrict =

Liuwu 柳梧(街道)新区 • སྣེའུ་གསར་པ་ཆུས།
- Subdistrict & New area
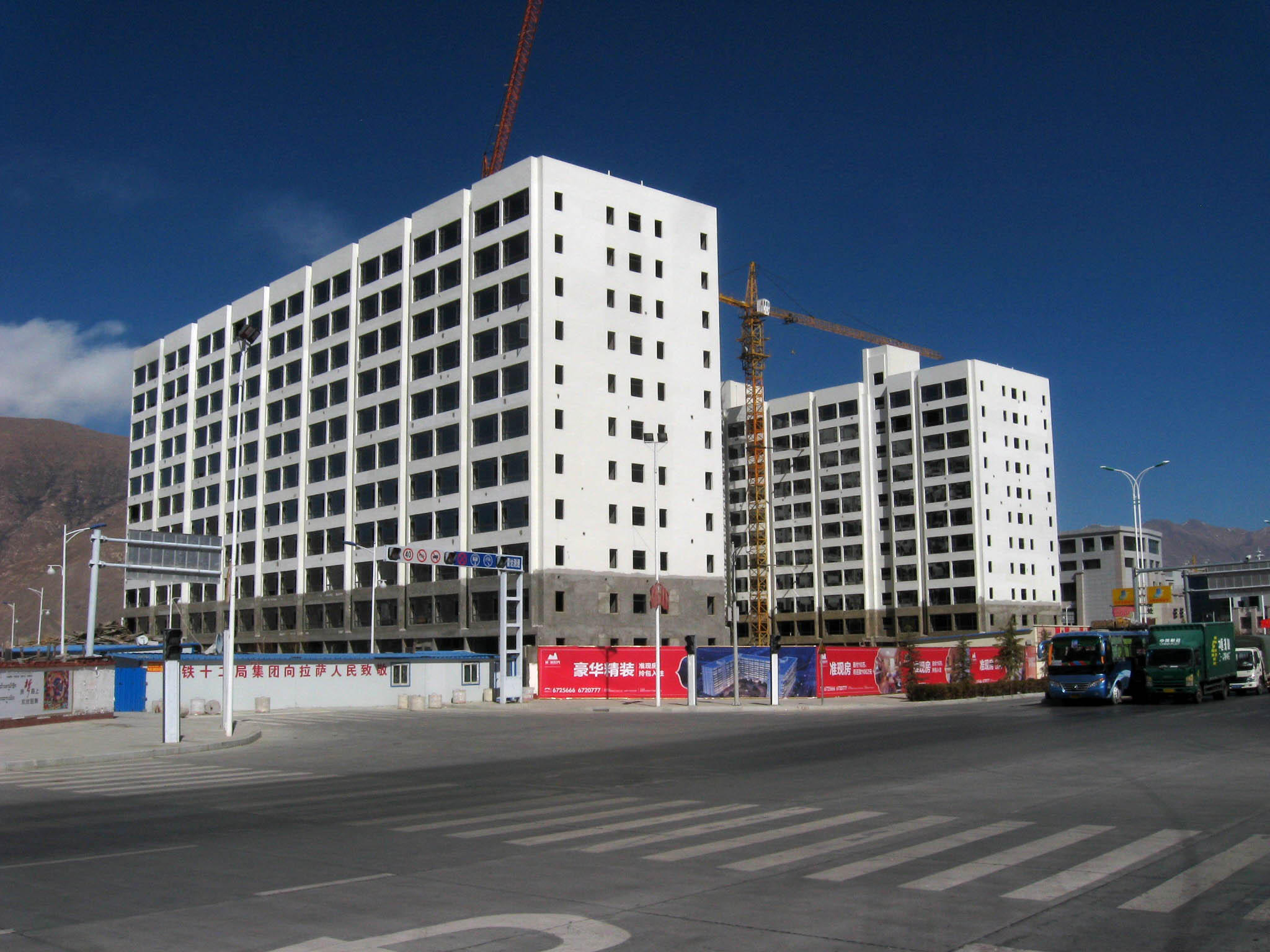

- Location within Tibet
- Coordinates: 29°37′39″N 91°04′37″E
- Country: People's Republic of China
- Region: Tibet
- Prefecture-level city: Lhasa
- District: Doilungdêqên
- Time zone: UTC+8 (China Standard)

Liuwu New Area or Niu New Area (སྣེའུ་གསར་པ་ཆུས།, Chinese: 柳梧新区; pinyin: Liǔwú Xīnqū), officially Liuwu Subdistrict or Niu Subdistrict (Chinese: 柳梧街道; pinyin: Liǔwú Jiēdào), is a subdivision of Doilungdêqên of Lhasa, Tibet in Western China. The Liuwu New Area is located southwest of downtown Chengguan, the old center of Lhasa.

The Liuwu Bridge links central Lhasa to Lhasa railway station and the Liuwu New Area on the south bank of the Lhasa River. Residents in the Niu area were resettled to make way for the new development. The 42-square-kilometre (16 sq mi) "Liuwu New District" includes new residential buildings. The villagers, numbering almost 1,700, were moved into these buildings. The effect of the railway, bridge and Liuwu New District development has been urbanization and development of new enterprises such as transport, retail outlets and restaurants. Constructions continues also in recent years. In first half of 2015 started construction for more residential buildings, shopping malls and business centres with area over 0.163 square kilometres (0.063 sq mi). Niu New Area have serious problems with water supplies.

== Transportation ==
- Lhasa railway station
- Lhasa Airport Expressway

== Sources ==
- "Resettlement and railroad construction in Lhasa: new images". International Campaign for Tibet. 2005-04-15.
- Zhang, Ru (2011-07-01). "Qinghai-Tibet Railway Changes Tibetan Village". China Radio International.
