= Liuwu Bridge =

Bridge in Lhasa, Tibet, China

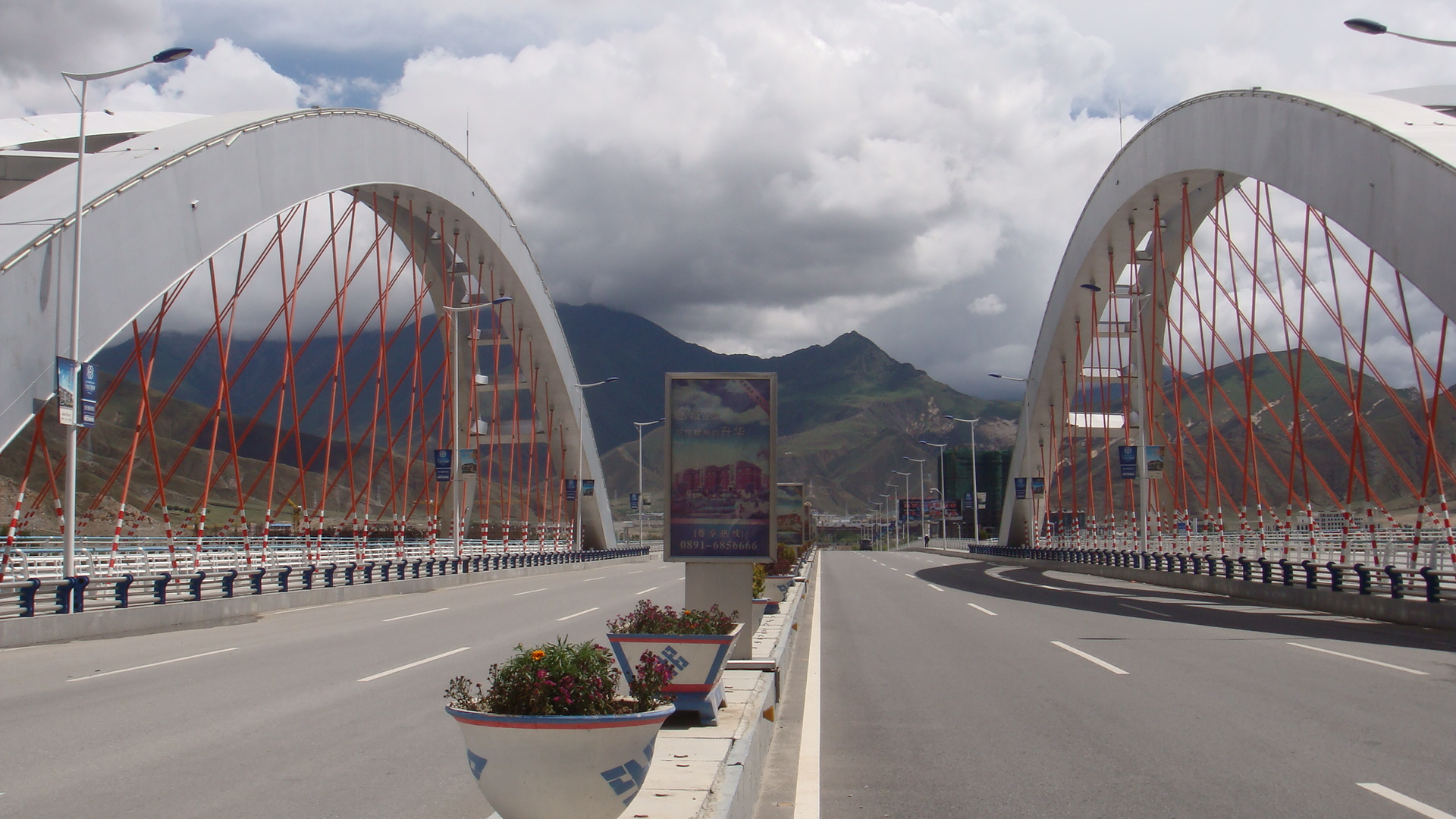
- Coordinates: 29.641994°N 91.082785°E
- Crosses: Lhasa River

Characteristics
- Total length: 1,600 metres (5,200 ft)
- Width: 29 metres (95 ft)
- Longest span: 120 metres (390 ft)

History
- Constructed by: China Communications Construction
- Construction start: 2004
- Construction end: April 2007
- Opened: 1 May 2007

Location
- Interactive map of Liuwu Bridge

The Liuwu Bridge (Chinese: 柳梧大桥; pinyin: Liǔ wú dàqiáo) crosses the Lhasa River linking downtown Lhasa, Tibet to Lhasa railway station and Niu New Area on the south bank. It was built in conjunction with the Qinghai–Tibet Railway, which terminates on the south side of the river, and provides a connection to the town center on the north side.

== Location ==
The Liuwu Bridge links central Lhasa to Lhasa Railway Station and the newly developed Niu New Area of Doilungdêqên County on the south bank of the Lhasa River. Residents in the Ne'u area were resettled to make way for the new development. The 42-square-kilometre (16 sq mi) "Liuwu New District" includes new residential buildings in traditional Tibetan style. The villagers, numbering almost 1,700, were moved into these buildings. The effect of the railway, bridge and Liuwu New District development has been urbanization and development of new enterprises such as transport, retail outlets and restaurants.

== Construction ==
The Liuwu Bridge was built by China Communications Construction and Tibet Skyway. The construction project began in 2004. On February 14, 2007 the two principal spans of the bridge were integrated as planned, and the minor compartment beams of the northern main span have also been cast, signifying the conclusion of the extensive concrete pouring for the Lhasa Liuwu Bridge. The completion of the bridge occurred in April 2007. It was opened to traffic on 1 May 2007. Total funding allocated to the project was RMB 388.51 million.

== Structure ==
The bridge is one of the notable structures of the 1,142-kilometre (710 mi) Qinghai–Tibet Railway, the highest railway in the world. It is the first urban overpass in the Tibet Autonomous Region. The total length is 1,600 metres (5,200 ft) and the elevated section is 1,373 metres (4,505 ft). The main span has a duplex basket-handle arch with a heeling angle of 28.4 degrees and an arch length of 120 metres (390 ft). The piers of the main bridge use piled underground diaphragm walls. The bridge is 29 metres (95 ft) wide, with three lanes in each direction. The structure includes the first cloverleaf junction in Tibet.

== Sources ==
- Bishop, Peter (2008-07-25). Bridge. Reaktion Books. ISBN 978-1-86189-469-4.
- "Construction of Liuwu Bridge in Lhasa". People's Daily. 2006-05-12.
- "Lhasa Liuwu Bridge". China Communications construction company. 2008-05-23.
- "Liuwu Bridge is under construction". China Daily. 2007-02-27.
- "Project Of Lhasa Liuwu Bridge Construction In Tibet". Chinabidding.
- "Resettlement and railroad construction in Lhasa: new images". International Campaign for Tibet. 2005-04-15.
- "Self-riding Tour in Lhasa City". Tibet Tour. 2014-07-02.
- Yang, Lina (2009-03-31). "Road network extends to all corners in Tibet". Xinhua. Archived from the original on April 14, 2009.
- Zhang, Ru (2011-07-01). "Qinghai-Tibet Railway Changes Tibetan Village". China Radio International. Archived from the original on December 25, 2011.
