= Nang County =

Nang County 朗县 • སྣང་རྫོང་།
- County
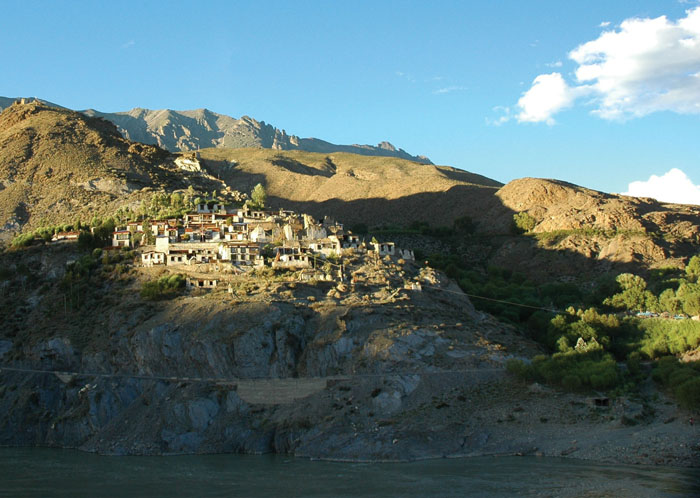
- Ba'er Qudesi in Nang County

- Location of the seat in Tibet Nang (China)
- Coordinates: 29.049°N 93.072°E
- Country: China
- Autonomous region: Tibet
- Prefecture-level city: Nyingchi
- County seat: Nang

Area
  - Total: 4,120 km^{2} (1,590 sq mi)

Population (2020)
  - Total: 17,648
  - Density: 4.28/km^{2} (11.1/sq mi)
- Time zone: UTC+8 (China Standard)
- Website: www.langxian.gov.cn

Nang County

Chinese name
- Simplified Chinese: 朗县
- Traditional Chinese: 朗縣
Transcriptions
Standard Mandarin
- Hanyu Pinyin: Lǎng Xiàn

Tibetan name
- Tibetan: སྣང་རྫོང་།
Transcriptions
- Wylie: snang rdzong
- Tibetan Pinyin: Nang Zong

Nang County (Tibetan: སྣང་རྫོང་།; Chinese: 朗县) is a county under the jurisdiction of Nyingtri City in the Tibet Autonomous Region, China.

== Geography ==
Nang is located in the south-west of Nyingtri, at the middle and lower reaches of the Yarlung Tsangpo River. The county seat of Nang County is situated in a region resembling an elephant's trunk, leading to the metaphorical designation of this area as "Nang" which translates to elephant. The average altitude is 5,000 metres above sea level.

== Administrative divisions ==
Nang County contains 3 towns and 3 townships.

Name	Chinese	Hanyu Pinyin	Tibetan	Wylie
Towns
Nang Town	朗镇	Lǎng zhèn	སྣང་གྲོང་རྡལ།	snang grong rdal
Dromda Town	仲达镇	Zhòngdá zhèn	སྒྲོམ་མདའ་གྲོང་རྡལ།	sgrom mda' grong rdal
Dungkar Town	洞嘎镇	Dònggā zhèn	དུང་དཀར་གྲོང་རྡལ།	dung dkar grong rdal
Townships
Latok Township	拉多乡	Lāduō xiāng	ལ་ཐོག་ཤང་།	la thog shang
Kyemtong Township	金东乡	Jīndōng xiāng	སྐྱེམས་སྟོང་ཤང་།	skyem stong shang
Dem Township	登木乡	Dēngmù xiāng	ལྡེམ་ཤང་།	ldem shang
* includes areas claimed but currently under control of the Indian state of Arunachal Pradesh.

== Gallery ==
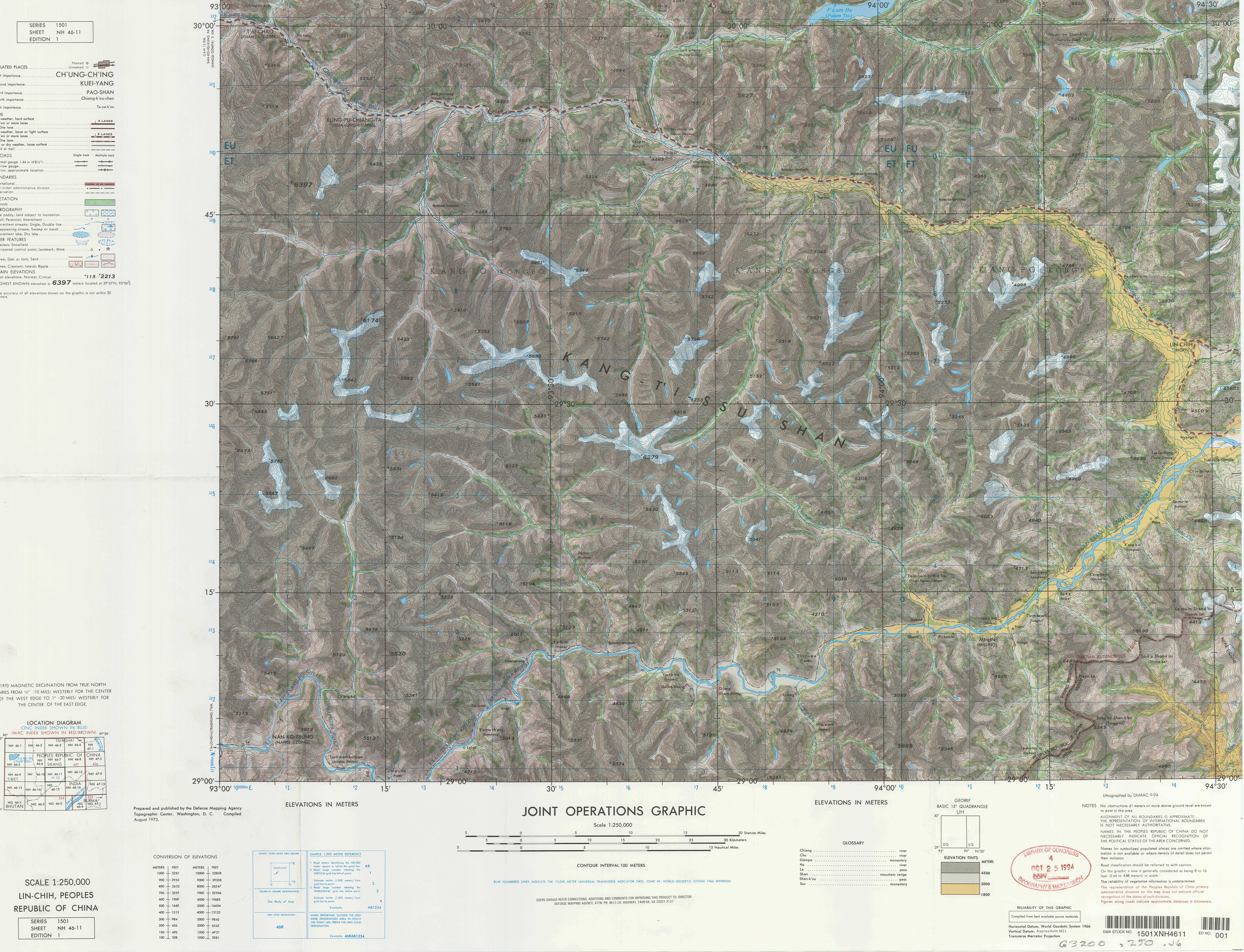

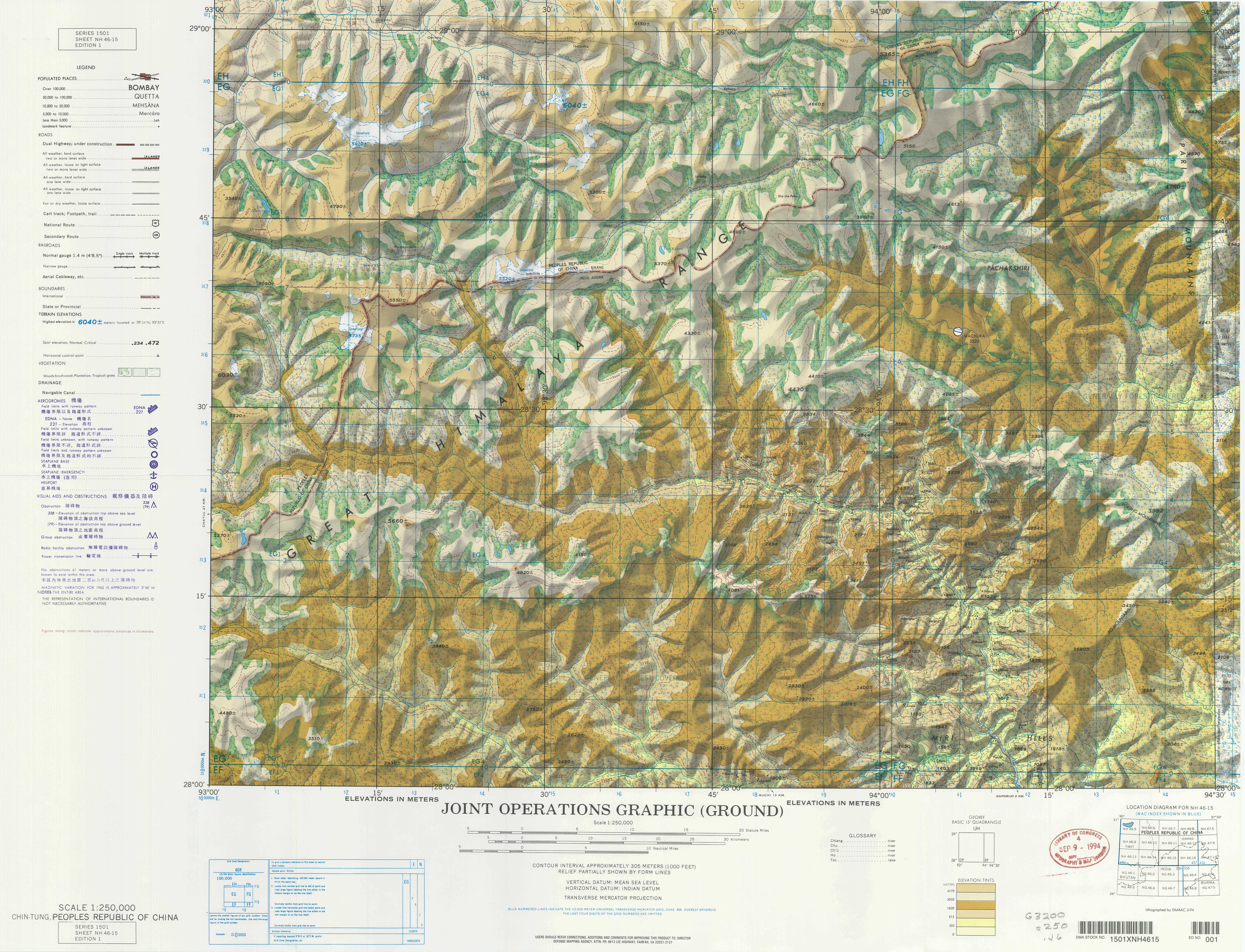

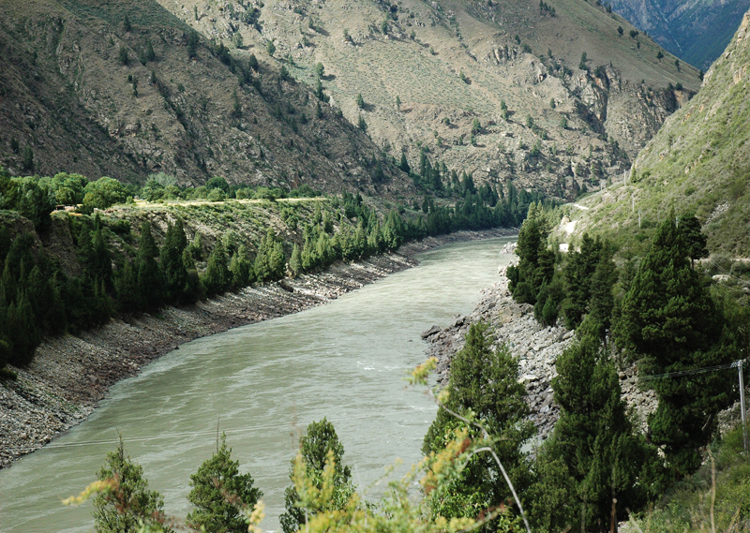
Yarlung Tsangpo in Nang County

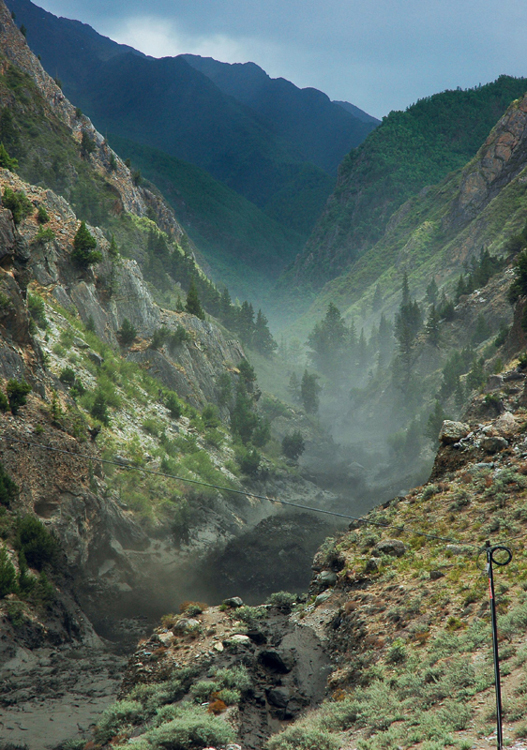
mudslides

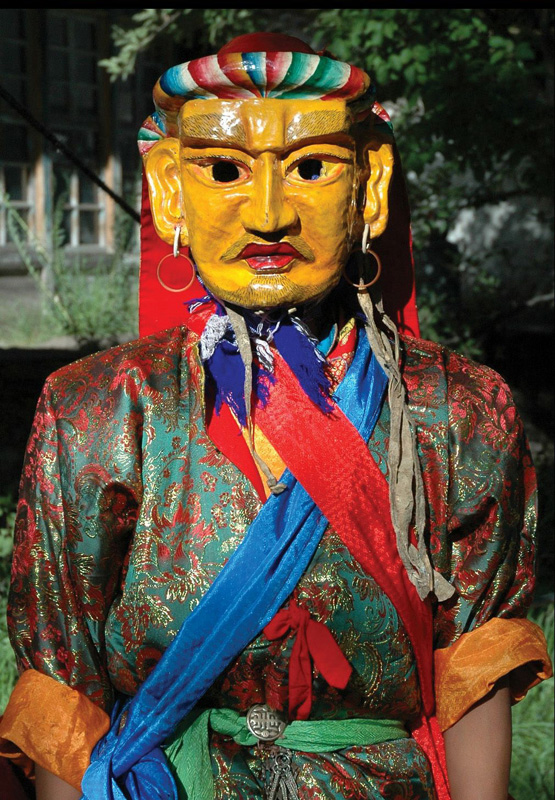
Tibetan goddess of fortune-telling in Ba'er Qudesi

== Transportation ==
In 1965, the Linzhi-Qiongduo River highway traversed Nang County, and in 2005, the Jiangbei Highway was inaugurated, extending through 18 administrative villages and 2 townships in Nang County. China National Highway 219 also traverses Langxian County. The Lhasa–Nyingchi railway commenced operations in 2021, featuring Nang County station.
