= Lhasa–Shigatse railway =

Railway line in Tibet, China

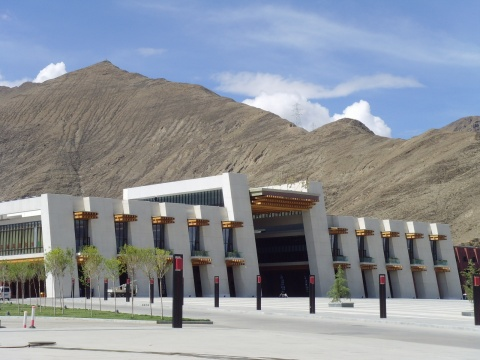
- The line's eastern terminus at Lhasa railway station

Overview
- Locale: Tibet Autonomous Region, China
- Termini: Lhasa railway station; Shigatse railway station

Service
- Type: Heavy rail

History
- Opened: 16 August 2014

Technical
- Line length: 253 km (157 mi)
- Number of tracks: 2
- Track gauge: 1,435 mm (4 ft 8 1/2 in) standard gauge
- Operating speed: 120 km/h (75 mph)

The Lhasa–Shigatse railway, or Lari railway (Tibetan: ལྷ་གཞིས་ལྕགས་ལམ་) (simplified Chinese: 拉日铁路; traditional Chinese: 拉日鐵路; pinyin: Lārì Tiělù), is a high-elevation railway that connects Lhasa to Shigatse (Xigazê), in the Tibet Autonomous Region. The travel time between Lhasa and Shigatse on this line is roughly three hours.

== History ==
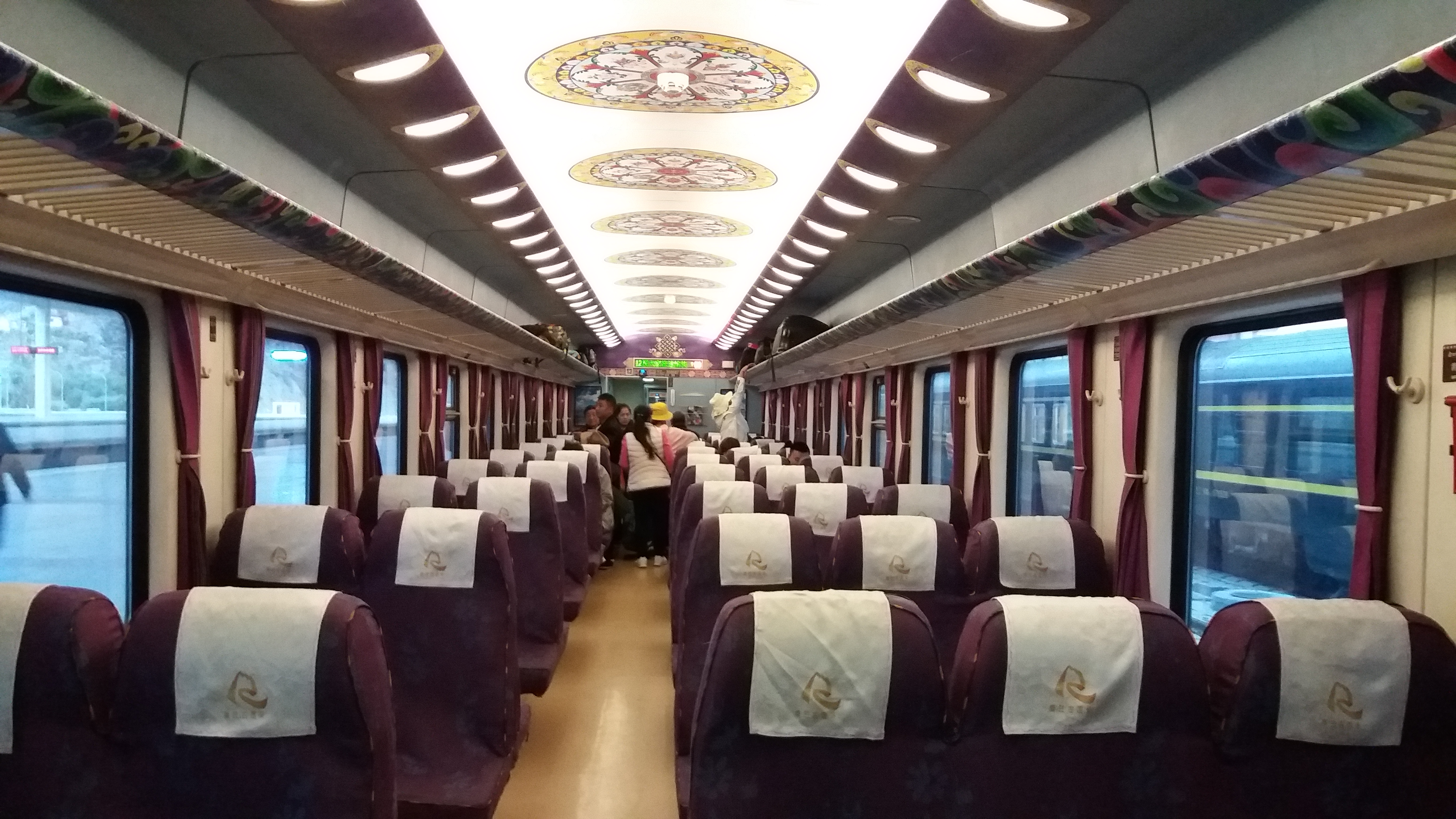
Inside Lhasa–Shigatse railway train

The line was a spur line of the Qinghai–Tibet railway. The length of the railway is 253 km (157 mi). Construction began in September 2010 and was connected to the Qinghai–Tibet Railway in May 2013. The line was completed in July 2014 and opened for commercial operations on August 16, 2014. Soon after opening, the line became the primary mode of transport between Lhasa and Shigatse; the two destinations were previously only connected by road and air, and air travel was too expensive at the time for the large majority of local residents.

The exiled Central Tibetan Administration in Dharamsala has claimed that the rail line will dilute the cultural identity of Tibetans by accelerating the movement of Han migrants into Tibet.

== Stations ==
The line includes 14 stations, of which only a few see regular passenger traffic (Qüxü, Rinbung). The project had a budget of 10.8 billion yuan.

The completion of this project opened up possible extensions of the network further west and south into Nepal and to Yadong County, close to the border with Sikkim, India.

- Lhasa railway station (拉萨)
- Lhasa South railway station (拉萨南)
- Baide railway station (白德)
- Xierong railway station (协荣)
- Qüxü County railway station (曲水县)
- Chabala railway station (茶巴拉)
- Nyêmo railway station (尼木)
- Karu railway station (卡如)
- Rinbung railway station (仁布)
- Dazhuka railway station (大竹卡)
- Denggu railway station (灯古)
- Jiqiong railway station (吉琼)
- Kadui railway station (卡堆)
- Shigatse railway station (日喀则)

== Extension ==
Although there were plans to extend the line with another 700 km (435 mi) to the Chinese border with Nepal, those plans became delayed due to difficulties on the Nepal side after the April 2015 Nepal earthquake. Feasibility studies were proposed for extension towards Zhangmu, although another border crossing may be chosen due to major Nepali abandonment of the border post. However it has also been reported that the line will be extended to Gyirong County regardless of the progress on the China-Nepal railway.

== See also ==
- Qinghai–Tibet railway
