= Gurum Township =

Human settlement in China

Coordinates: 29°42′N 90°48′E

Gurum (རྒུ་རུམ་, 古荣乡) is a small town and township of Doilungdêqên District in the Tibet Autonomous Region of China.

== See also ==
- List of towns and villages in Tibet
