= Doilungdêqên, Lhasa =

Doilungdêqên 堆龙德庆区 • སྟོད་ལུང་བདེ་ཆེན་ཆུས།
- District
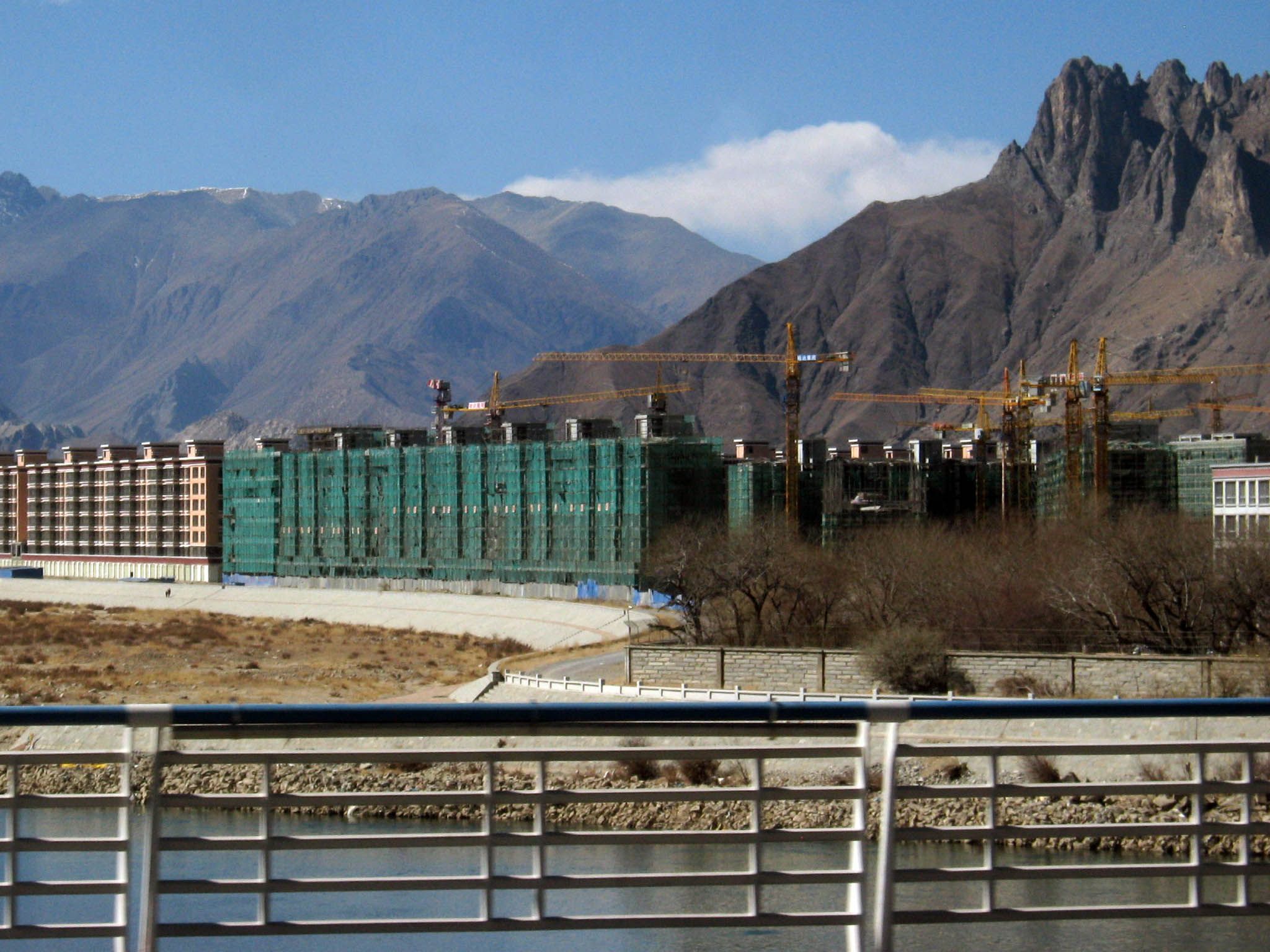
- New construction in Liuwu New Area

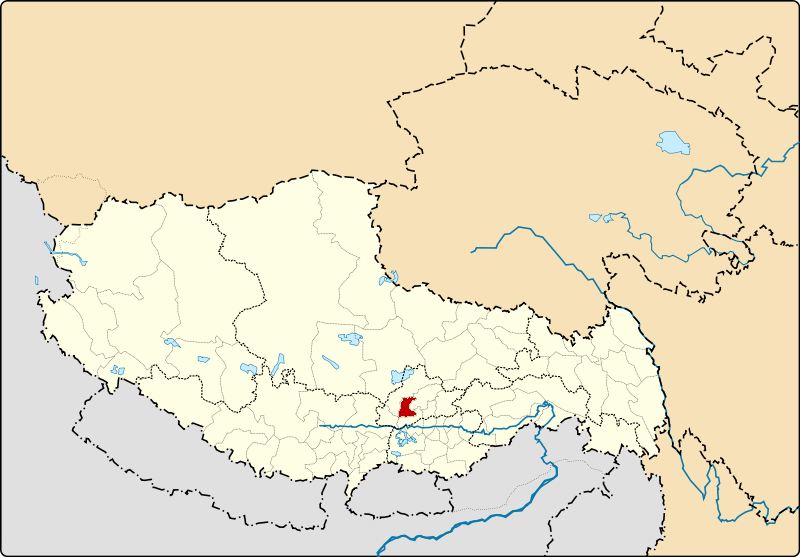
- Location of Doilungdêqên within Tibet Autonomous Region
- Interactive map of Doilungdêqên
- Location in Tibet Autonomous Region Doilungdêqên (China)
- Coordinates: 29°39′N 91°00′E
- Country: China
- Autonomous region: Tibet
- Prefecture-level city: Lhasa
- District seat: Donggar Subdistrict

Area
  - Total: 2,682 km^{2} (1,036 sq mi)

Population (2020)
  - Total: 137,451
  - Density: 51.25/km^{2} (132.7/sq mi)
- Time zone: UTC+8 (China Standard)
- Website: www.dldqq.gov.cn

Doilungdêqên District

Chinese name
- Simplified Chinese: 堆龙德庆区
- Traditional Chinese: 堆龍德慶區
Transcriptions
Standard Mandarin
- Hanyu Pinyin: Duīlóngdéqìng Qū

Tibetan name
- Tibetan: སྟོད་ལུང་བདེ་ཆེན་ཆུས།
Transcriptions
- Wylie: stod lung bde chen chus
- Tibetan Pinyin: Dölungdêqên Qü

Doilungdêqên District is a district in Lhasa, north-west of the main center of Chengguan, Tibet Autonomous Region. It is largely agricultural or pastoral, but contains the western suburbs of the city of Lhasa. The Duilong River runs southeast through the district to the Lhasa River. A prehistoric site appears to be 3600–3000 years old. The district is home to the Tsurphu Monastery (1189) and the 17th century Nechung monastery.

== Etymology ==
In the mid-14th century, a lamasery named Dêqên (literally, "Great bliss") was built in Donggar, which later became a dzong or county of the Phagmodrupa dynasty. The local people called it Doilung (literally, "upper valley"), and it was thus collectively known as Doilungdêqên. (Note: Another source says that in Tibetan Duilong means "legendary" and Deqing means "the seventh heaven" Yet another says the name means "Joy on the Heights".)

== Topography ==
The district is located in south-central Tibet. It contains the western suburbs of the city of Lhasa, capital of the Tibet Autonomous Region, which begin about 12 kilometres (7.5 mi) from the city center. It covers an area of 2,704 square kilometers, with 94,969 acres of farmland.

The district borders on the north Tibet grasslands in the northwest. The valley of the Doilung River leads south to the Lhasa River, and is contained by two ridges of the Nyenchen Tanglha Mountains. The Duilong is 95 kilometres (59 mi) in length, and has hydroelectrical power generation capacity of 4,000 KW. In the south the district occupies part of the south bank of the Lhasa River. There are about sixty rivers and streams in total. The district has an average elevation of 4,000 metres (13,000 ft), with a highest elevation of 5,500 metres (18,000 ft) and a lowest point at 3,640 metres (11,940 ft).

== Environment ==
There are about 120 frost-free days annually. Annual mean temperature is 7 °C (45 °F), with temperatures in January falling below −10 °C (14 °F) Annual precipitation is about 440 millimetres (17 in), with autumn rainfall of 310 millimetres (12 in). The district is agriculturally rich and was used by the Tibetan kings as a source of food for Lhasa. Wildlife includes roe deer, otter, brown bear, leopard, black-necked crane, Chinese caterpillar fungus, Fritillaria and snow lotus. Military personnel have been involved in efforts to protect and improve the environment, including replanting programs.

== Demographics ==
In 1992 there were 33,581 people in 6,500 households, with 94.28% of the people engaged in farming. About 90% of the people were ethnic Tibetan, with most people of other ethnicity living in Donggar. The 2000 census gave a total population of 40,543 people: Donggar 9,359, Naiqiong 7,838, Dechen 5,731 people, Mar 4,458, Gurung 5,664, Yabda 3,664, Liuwu 3,829. The total population as of the end of 2007 was 45,551 people. The first drug rehabilitation center in Tibet was being constructed in Duilongdeqing District in 2009. It would provide physiological rehabilitation, psychological therapy and job training for up to 150 drug addicts.

== History ==
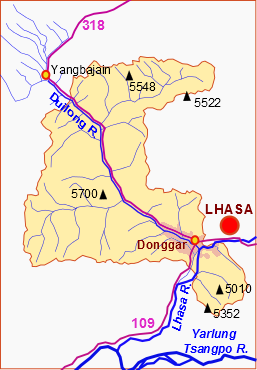
The built-up area (pink) within the Doilungdêqên District (yellow)

Duilongdeqing County was founded in September 1959, and in February 1960 expanded to include the western suburbs of Lhasa. The district has been rapidly urbanizing. In January 2015 the former county government was preparing to upgrade Doilungdêqên into Lhasa's second urban district. The county was finally upgraded into a district on 13 October 2015.

== Administration divisions ==
The district has jurisdiction over four subdistricts and three towns, covering thirty-five administrative villages. The seat of government is in the town of Donggar. This is just 14 kilometres (8.7 mi) from downtown Lhasa.

Name	Tibetan	Tibetan Pinyin	Chinese	Pinyin
Subdistricts
Donggar Subdistrict	གདོང་དཀར་ཁྲོམ་གཞུང་།	Donggar Tromzhung	东嘎街道	Dōnggā Jiēdào
Liuwu Subdistrict (Niu Subdistrict)	སྣེའུ་ཁྲོམ་གཞུང་།	Niu Tromzhung	柳梧街道	Liǔwú Jiēdào
Naiqung Subdistrict	གནས་ཆུང་ཁྲོམ་གཞུང་།	Naiqung Tromzhung	乃琼街道	Nǎiqióng Jiēdào
Yabda Subdistrict	ཡབ་མདའ་ཁྲོམ་གཞུང་།	Yabda Tromzhung	羊达街道	Yángdá Jiēdào
Towns
Dêqên Town	བདེ་ཆེན་གྲོང་རྡལ།	Dêqên Chongdai	德庆镇	Déqìng Zhèn
Mar Town	དམར་གྲོང་རྡལ།	Mar Chongdai	马镇	Mǎ Zhèn
Gurum Town	རྒུ་རུམ་གྲོང་རྡལ།	Gurum Chongdai	古荣镇	Gǔróng Zhèn

== Economy ==
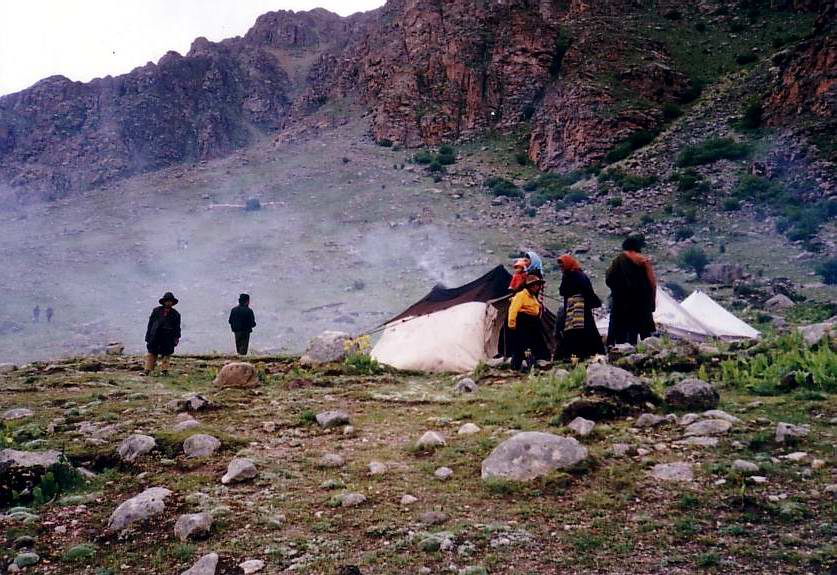
Nomad camp above Tsurphu Gompa in 1993

Until the 1980s almost all of the rural residents farmed and raised livestock. After reform and an open policy were adopted, growing numbers began to move into industry, construction, transport, commerce and more skilled occupations. In the mid-1980s many local factories and processing plants were built at the village level, but most of them failed to survive. The construction force grew in the 1980s to meet demand for "43 engineering projects" in Lhasa, and construction remained an important source of employment in the late 1990s. At the same time, inefficient traditional farming and herding practices were replaced by more modern techniques.

The economy is still dominated by agriculture. Vegetable production is an important industry in Donggar. Other agricultural products include wheat, spring wheat, barley, peas, beans and potatoes. Livestock includes zaks, sheep, goats and poultry. The main mineral resources are coal, iron, clay, lead and zinc.

== Communications ==
The Qinghai–Tibet Railway runs through the district beside the Qinghai–Tibet Highway (China National Highway 318) from northeast to southwest. The district is crossed by China National Highway 109 in the south. 47 other roads have a total length of 270 kilometres (170 mi). Lhasa railway station is in Liuwu township. The terminus of the Qinghai–Tibet line, it is over 3,600 metres (11,800 ft) above sea level, and is its largest passenger transport station. It includes a clinic with oxygen treatment facilities. The station uses solar energy for heating.

== Landmarks ==
The best-known landmark is Tsurphu Monastery, built in 1189 and treated as a regional cultural relic reserve. The monastery was founded by Düsum Khyenpa, 1st Karmapa Lama, founder of Karma Kagyu school. It is the main Kagyu temple. The Nechung Monastery, former home of the Nechung Oracle, is located in Naiquong township. Nechung was built by the 5th Dalai Lama (1617–82). Nechung was almost completely destroyed during the Cultural Revolution but has been largely restored. There is a huge new statue of Guru Rinpoche (Padmasambhava) on the second floor. There are also hot springs that are said to have various curative powers.

A prehistoric site was found in 2007 in a location where sand was being quarried at Chang Village in Yabda Township at 3,642 metres (11,949 ft) above sea level, about 18 kilometres (11 mi) west of Lhasa. The site was protected pending formal excavation. A layer about 15 to 30 centimetres (5.9 to 11.8 in) thick contained charcoal, ash, animal bones, pottery and stone tools. The site appears to be 3600–3000 years old.

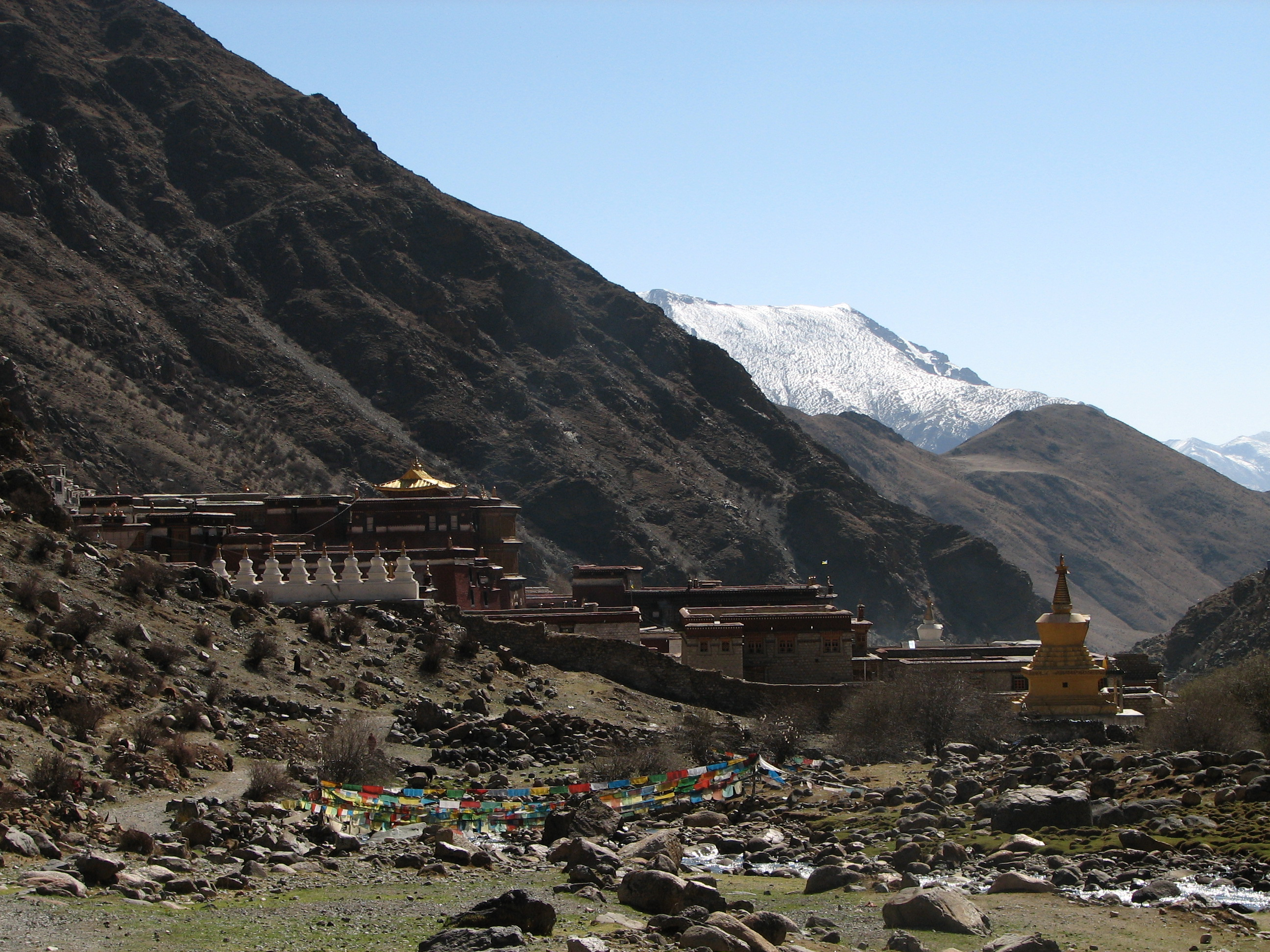
Tsurpu Monastery

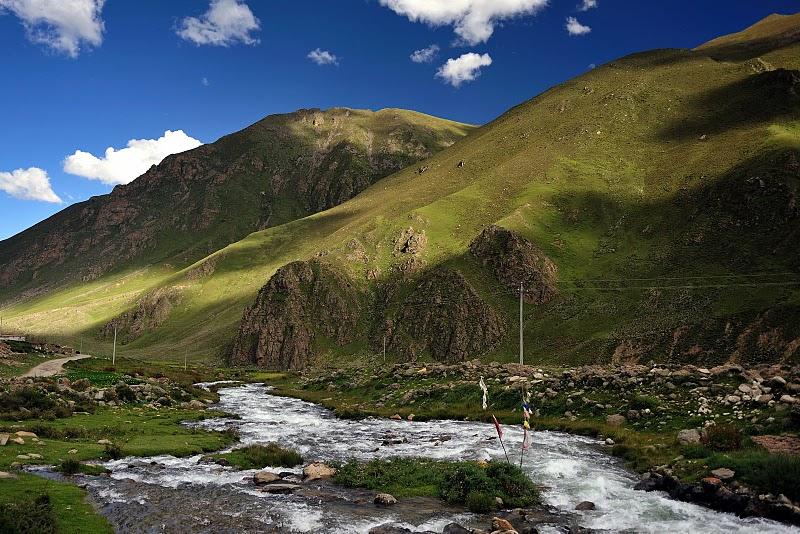
Landscape near Tsurphu Monastery

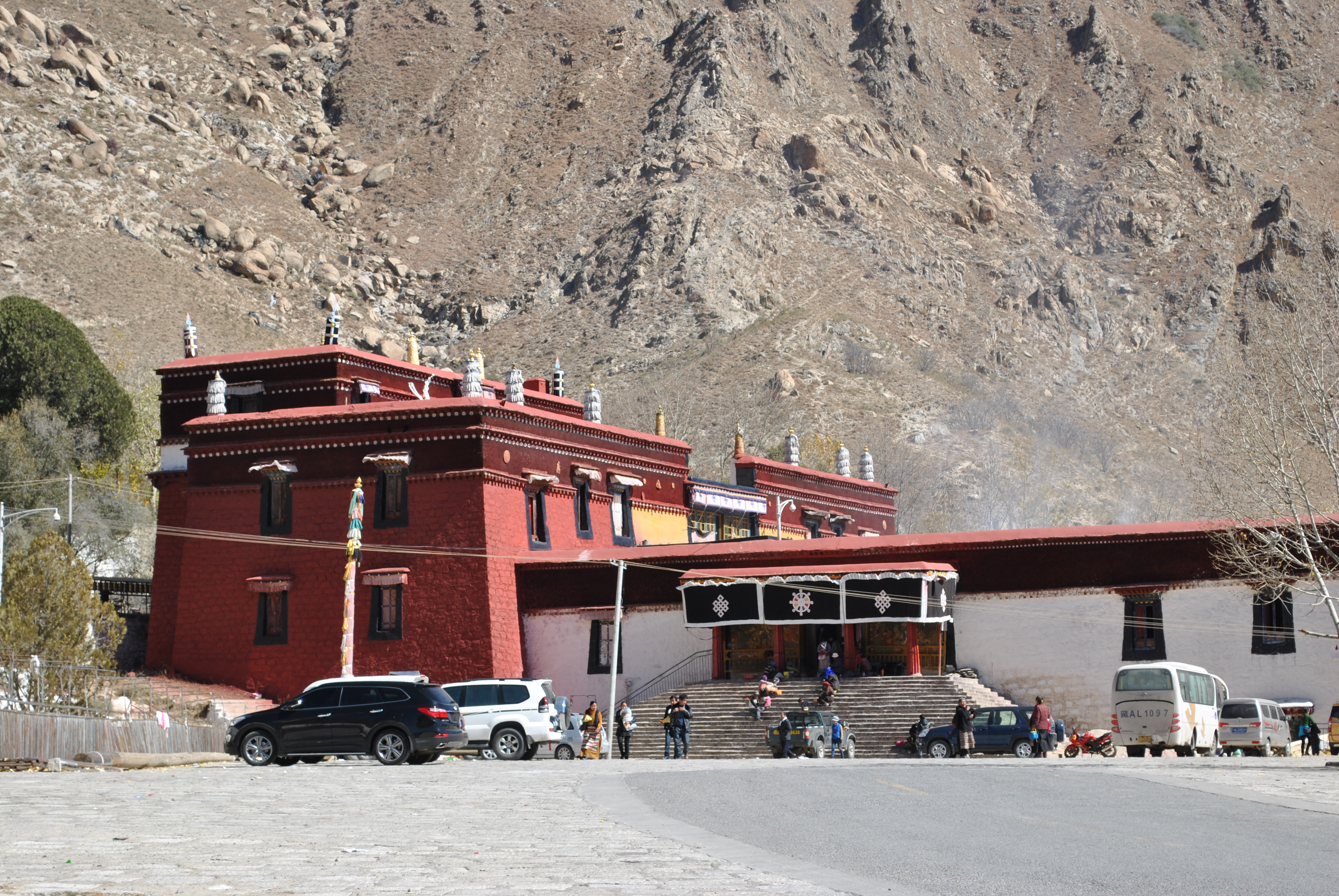
Nechung monastery to the west of downtown Lhasa

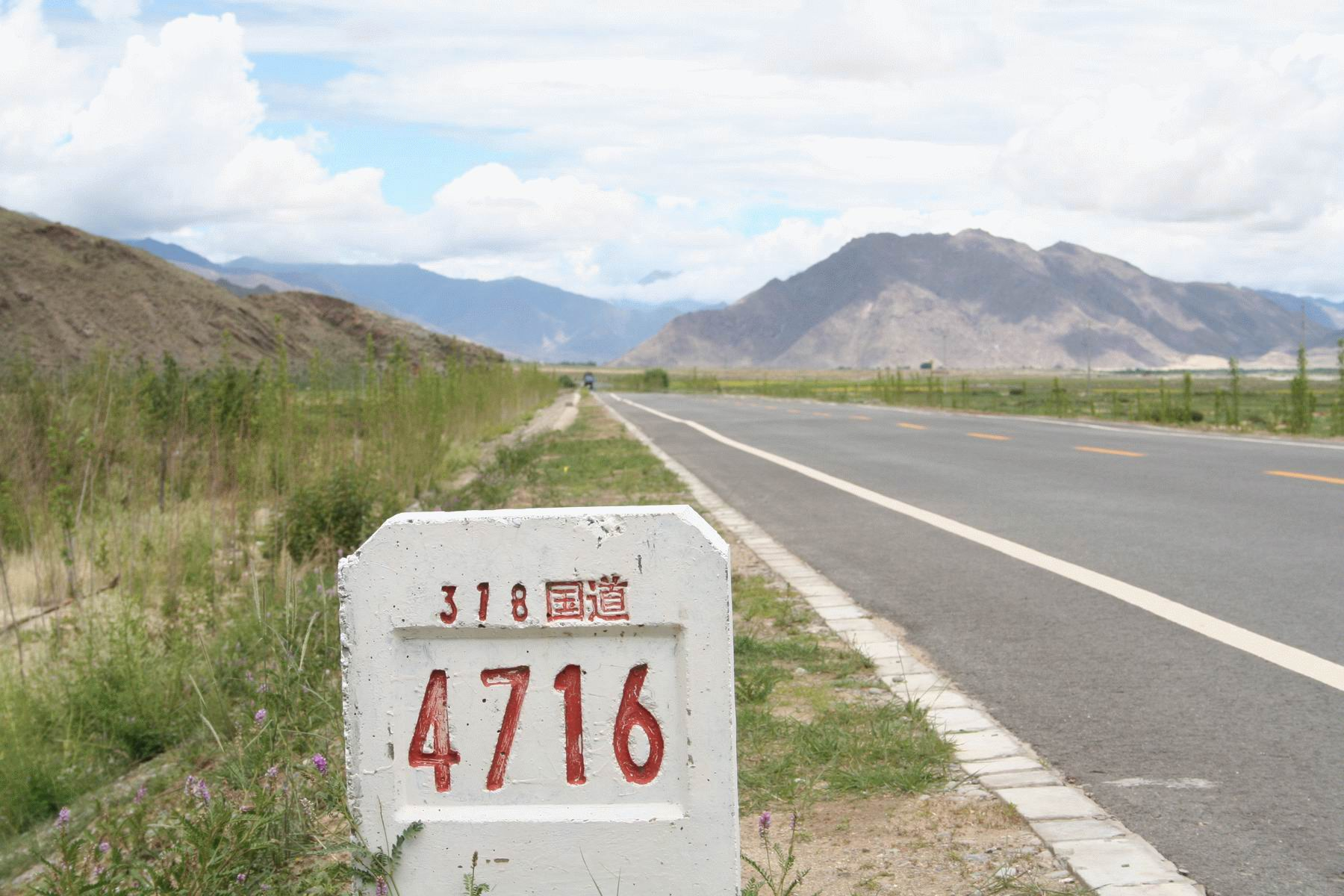
China National Highway 318 between Doilungdêqên and Qüxü County

== See also ==
- Liuwu New Area

== Sources ==
- "Duilongdeqing County". Administrative divisions Network (in Chinese).
- "First drug rehabilitation center in Tibet to be constructed in Duilongdeqing County". China Tiber Online. 2009-06-29. Archived from the original on 2009-07-15.
- Foster, Simon; Lee, Candice; Lin-Liu, Jen; Reiber, Beth; Tini Tran; Lee Wing-sze; Christopher D. Winnan (2012-03-12). Frommer's China. John Wiley & Sons. ISBN 978-1-118-23677-2.
- Ge Le; Li Tao (1996). "Rural Urbanization in China's Tibetan Region: Duilongdeq County as a Typical Example" (PDF). Chinese Sociology and Anthropology. 28 (4).
- Guo, Feng Peng (2014-07-19). "Tibet Duilongdeqing county total civilian ecological vanguard striving to protect the mountains". Archived from the original on 2015-02-10.
- LaRocca, Donald J. (2006-01-01). Warriors of the Himalayas: Rediscovering the Arms and Armor of Tibet. Metropolitan Museum of Art. ISBN 978-1-58839-180-3.
- "Lhasa Duilongdeqing County Introduction". Lhasa Tourism (in Chinese).
- "Lhasa Duilongdeqing County Profile". Chinese Government Network (in Chinese). Archived from the original on 2015-02-09.
- "Lhasa Railway Station". Tripadvisor. Archived from the original on 2015-02-10.
- "Lhasa Railway Station Duilongdeqing County". China Comfort Travel. Archived from the original on 2015-02-10.
- Lin, Tony (2014-05-27). "Duilongdeqing County, Lhasa". Tibet Travel.
- Ling, Yang Yunqin (2015-01-23). "Lhasa Duilongdeqing County Magistrate: actively preparing..." People's Daily (in Chinese).
- Mayhew, Bradley; Kohn, Michael (2005). Tibet. Lonely Planet Publications. ISBN 1-74059-523-8.
- Wangdu, Owen (2008-03-06). "Tibet Duilongdeqing County Prehistoric Site Discovered".
