= Lhasa railway station =

Railway station in Lhasa, China

Lhasa ལྷ་ས་ 拉萨
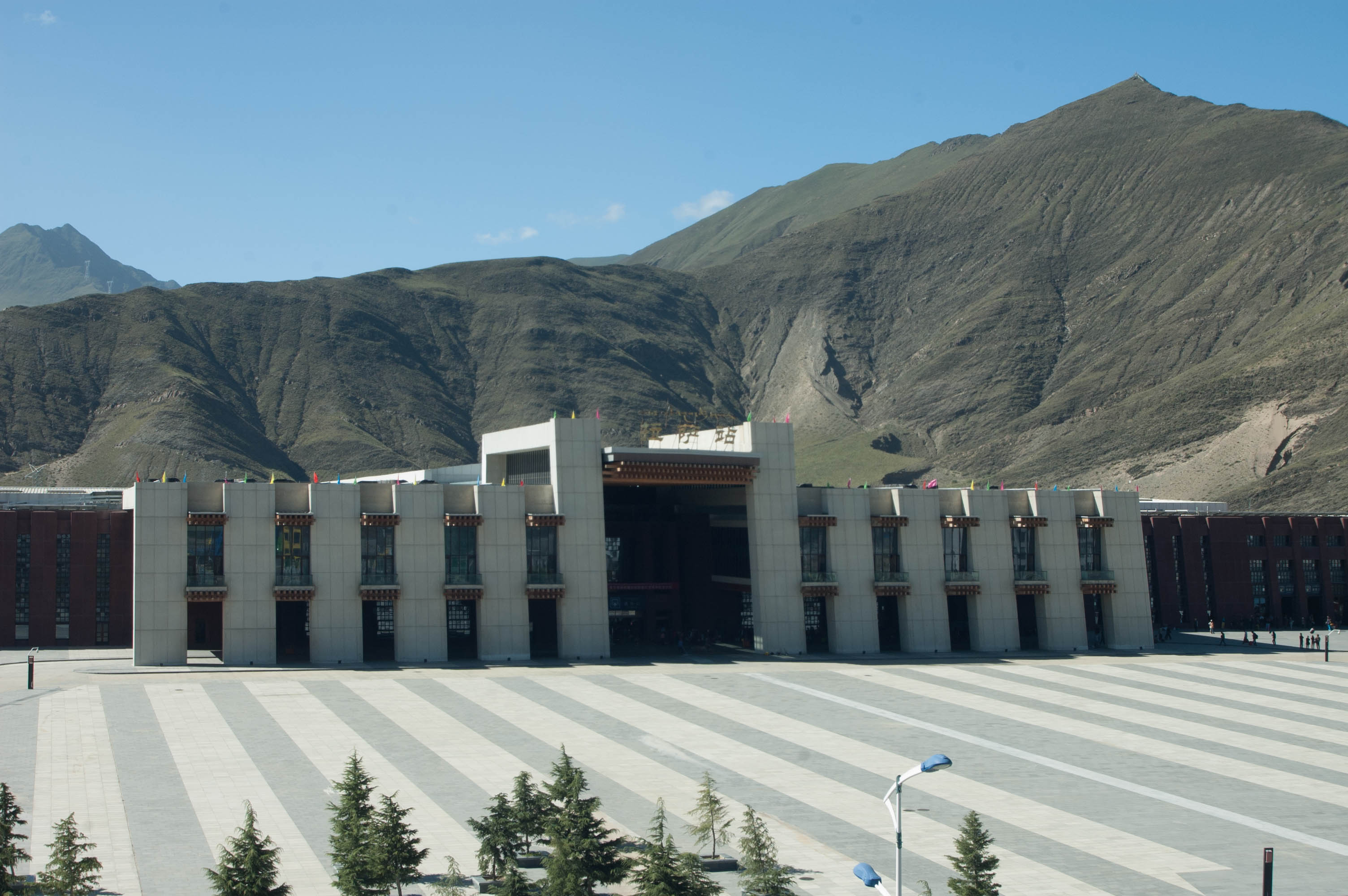
- Lhasa Station

General information
- Location: Doilungdêqên, Lhasa, Tibet; China
- Coordinates: 29°37′30″N 91°04′07″E
- Elevation: +3,641 m
- Lines: Qinghai–Tibet railway; Lhasa–Xigazê railway; Lhasa–Nyingchi railway
- Platforms: 4
- Connections: Bus terminal

History
- Opened: 2006

Services
Preceding station	China Railway	Following station
Lhasa West towards Xining	Qinghai–Tibet railway	Terminus
Terminus	Lhasa–Xigazê railway	Lhasa South towards Xigazê
Terminus	Lhasa–Nyingchi railway	Lhasa South towards Nyingchi
Location

Lhasa railway station (Tibetan: ལྷ་སའི་འབབ་ཚུགས་, ZWPY: Lhasai babcug, simplified Chinese: 拉萨站; traditional Chinese: 拉薩站; pinyin: Lāsà zhàn) is a railway station in Lhasa, Tibet Autonomous Region, China.

== Location ==
The railway station lies in Niu New Area, Doilungdêqên District, 1 kilometer to the south of the Lhasa River and 5 kilometers southwest of the Potala Palace.

The Liuwu Bridge links central Lhasa to Lhasa railway station and the newly developed Niu New Area on the south bank of the Lhasa River. The bridge is one of the notable structures of the 1,142 kilometres (710 mi) Qinghai–Tibet Railway, the highest railway in the world.

== Schedules ==
In addition to the Qinghai-Tibet Railway, the station is served by the Lhasa–Shigatse railway to Shigatse in western Tibet. The station will also be the future terminus of the Sichuan–Tibet railway from Chengdu, with the first section to Nyingchi opened in June 2021 and the full line planned to open in 2030.

As of 2020, there are nine daily departures: two to Shigatse and seven via Xining. Of these, one terminates, and the remaining six each continue to one of the following destinations: Beijing West, Chengdu, Chongqing West, Guangzhou, Lanzhou, Shanghai.

== Track layout ==
The Lhasa passenger railway station is large compared to current needs, containing four tracks serving two island platforms under one roof. There is space for one more island platform and three more tracks.

A departure indicator displays information regarding the next four trains scheduled to depart in both Chinese and Tibetan. The times and train numbers are in Latin alphanumeric characters.

== Gallery ==
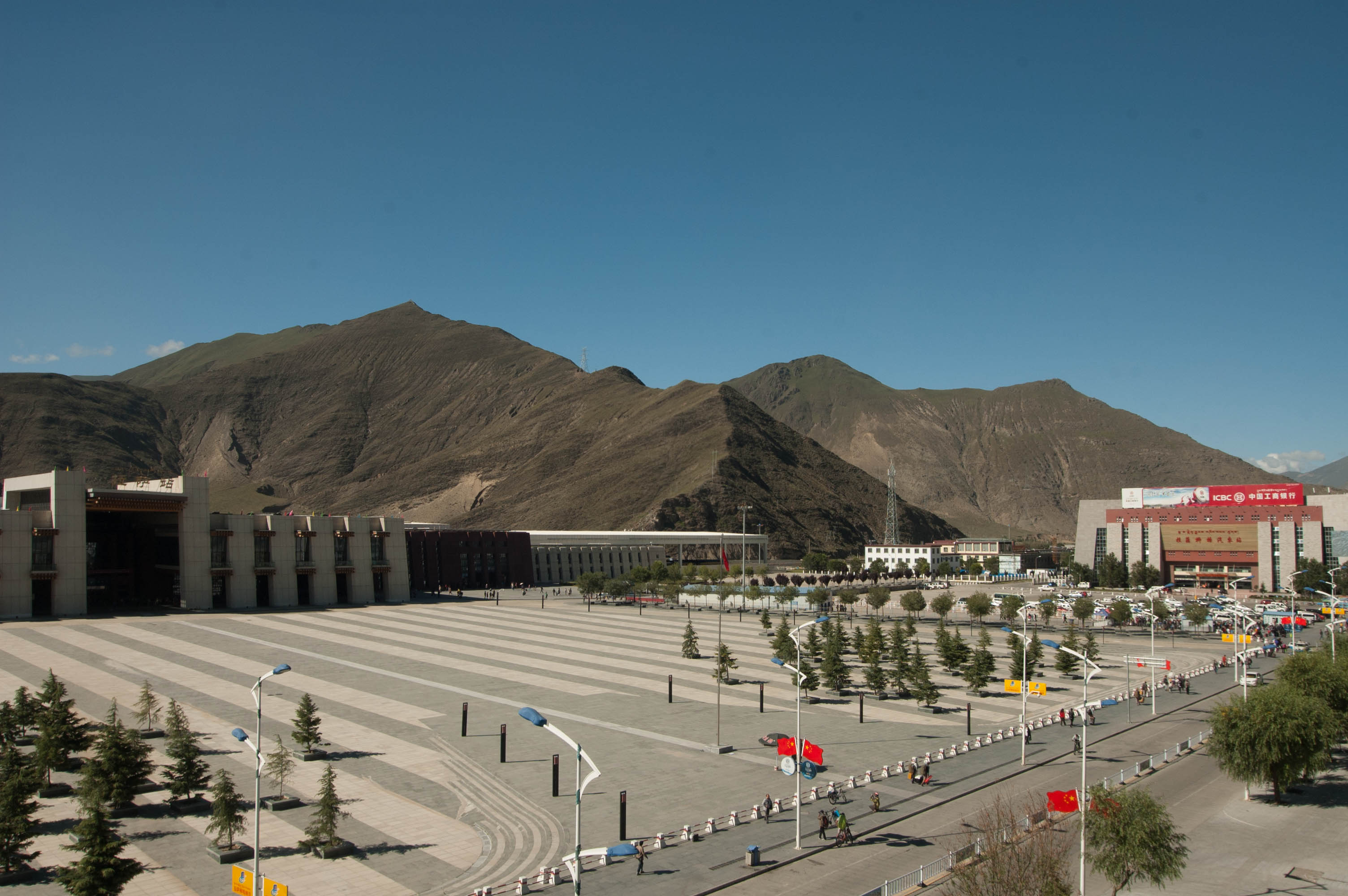
Station bus stop

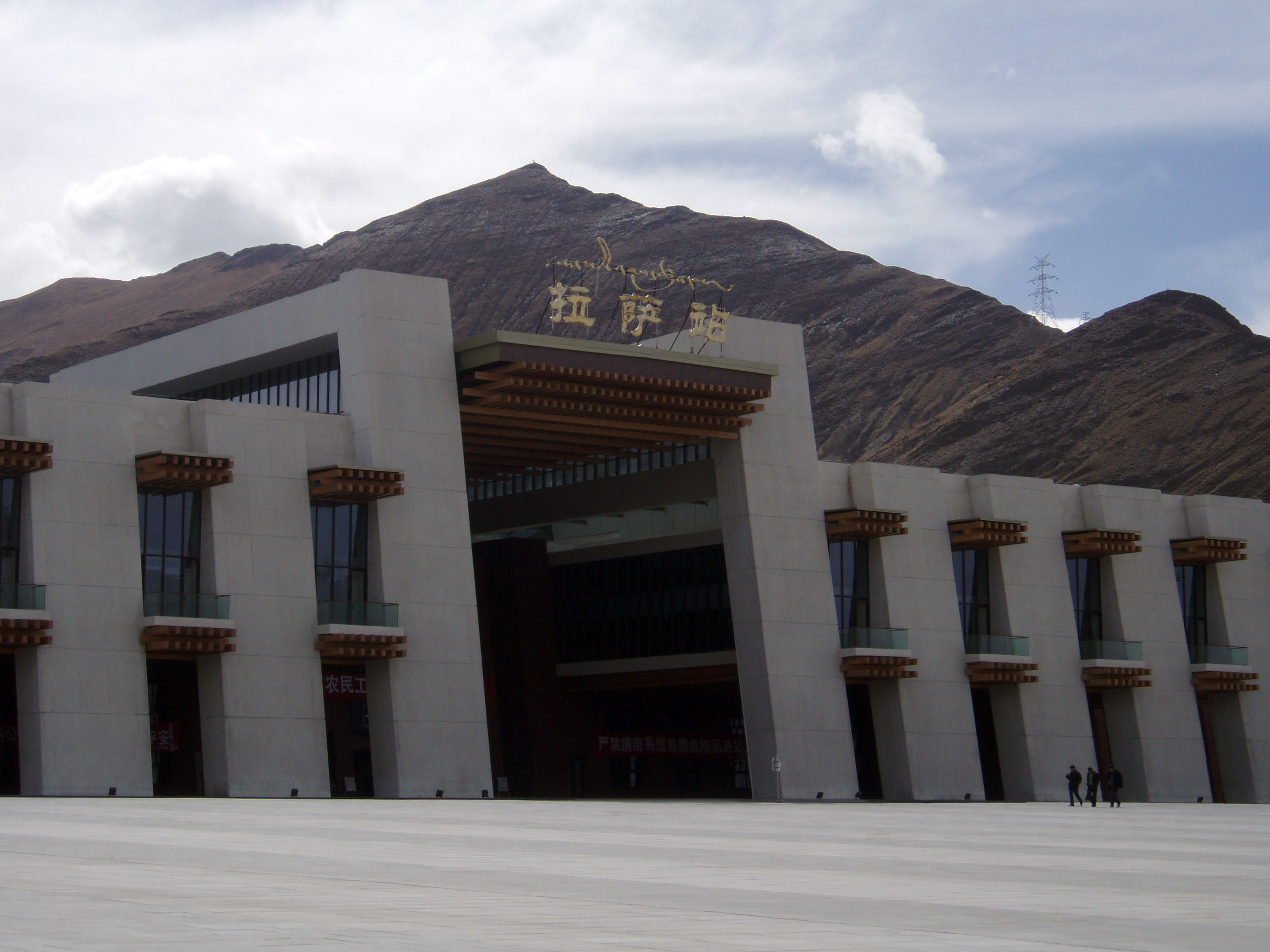
Station Building

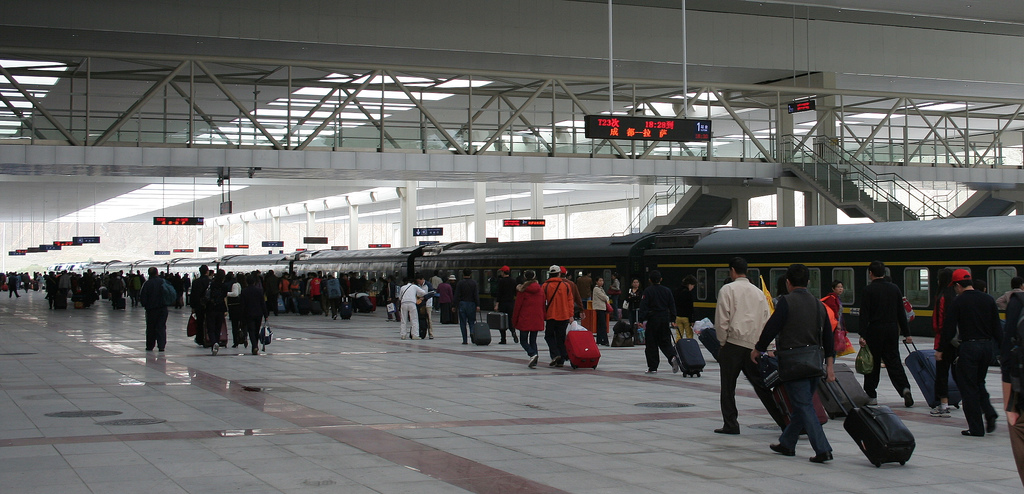
One of the station platforms

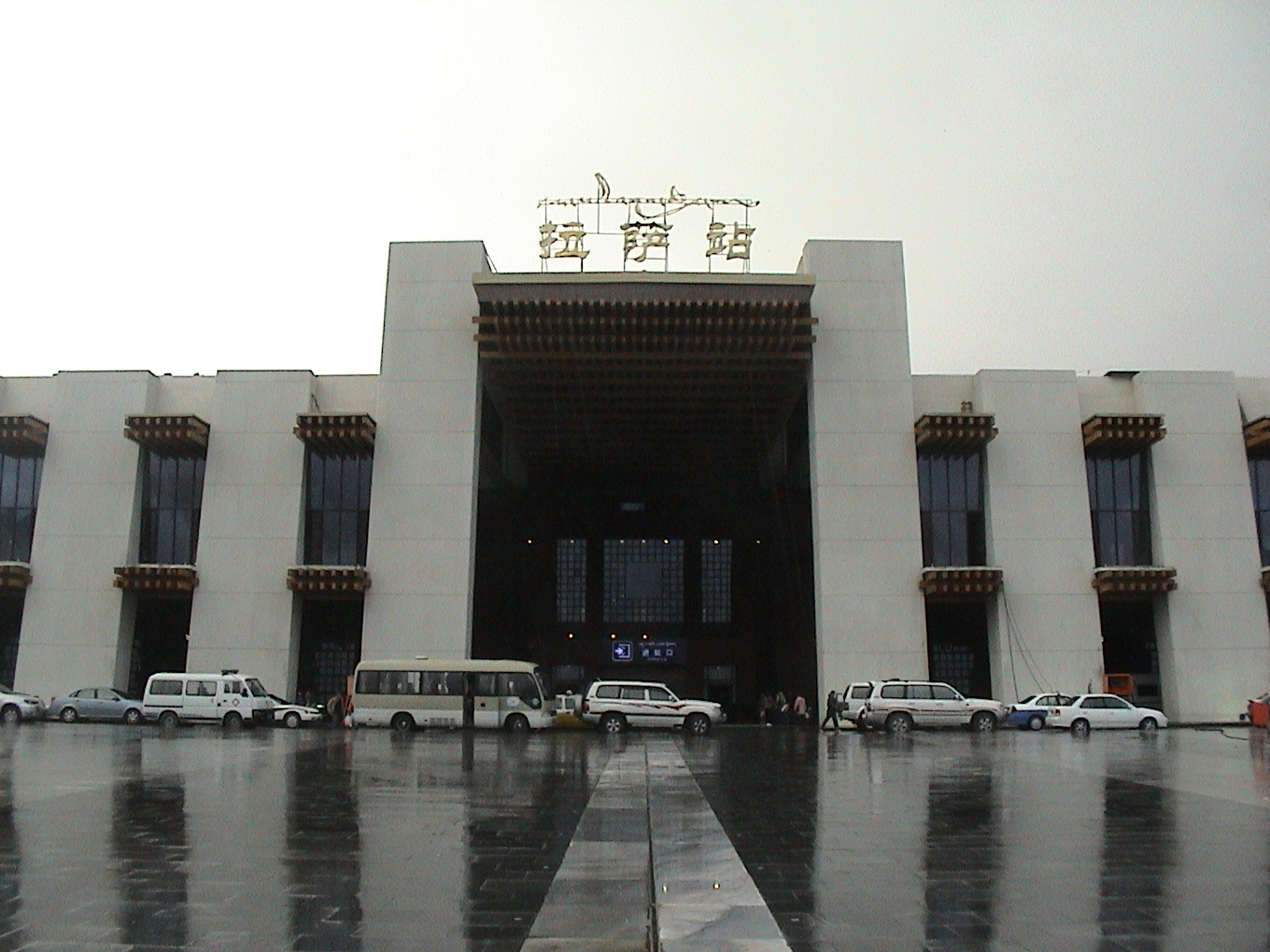
The front view of the station building

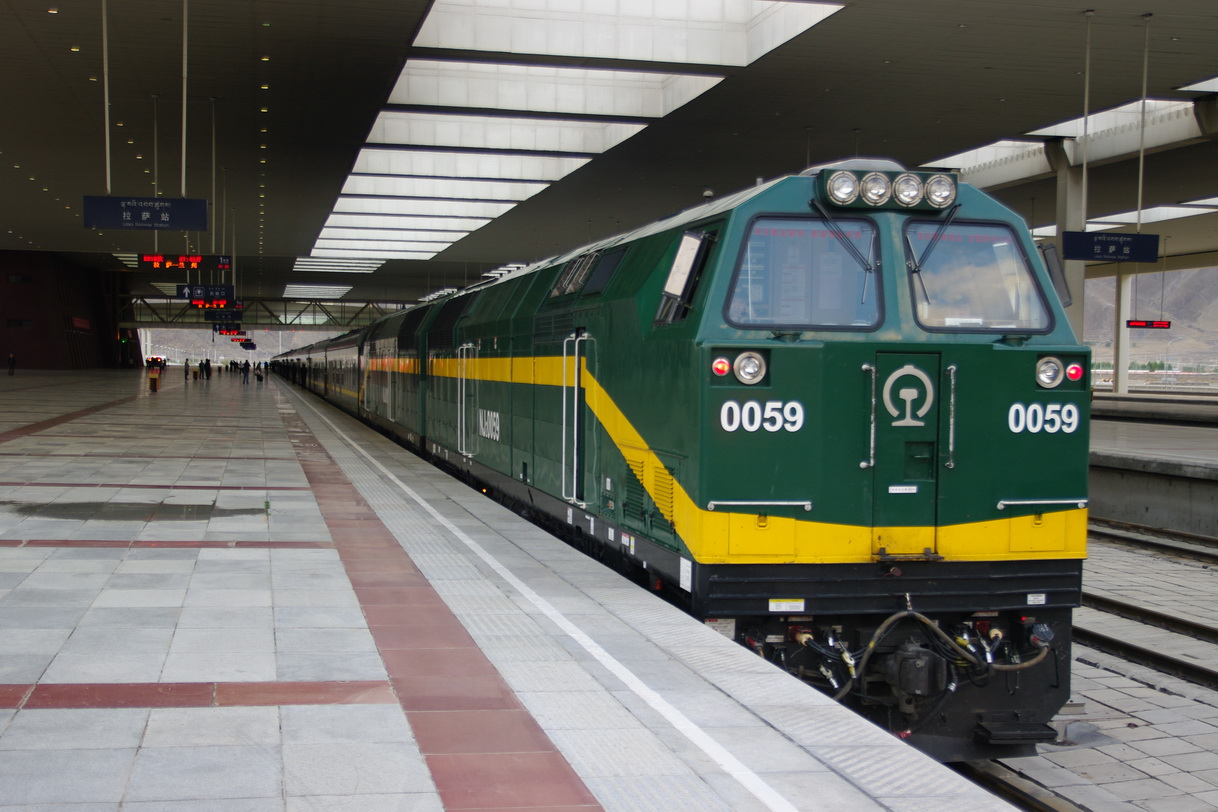
An NJ2 Diesel Engine at Lhasa Station

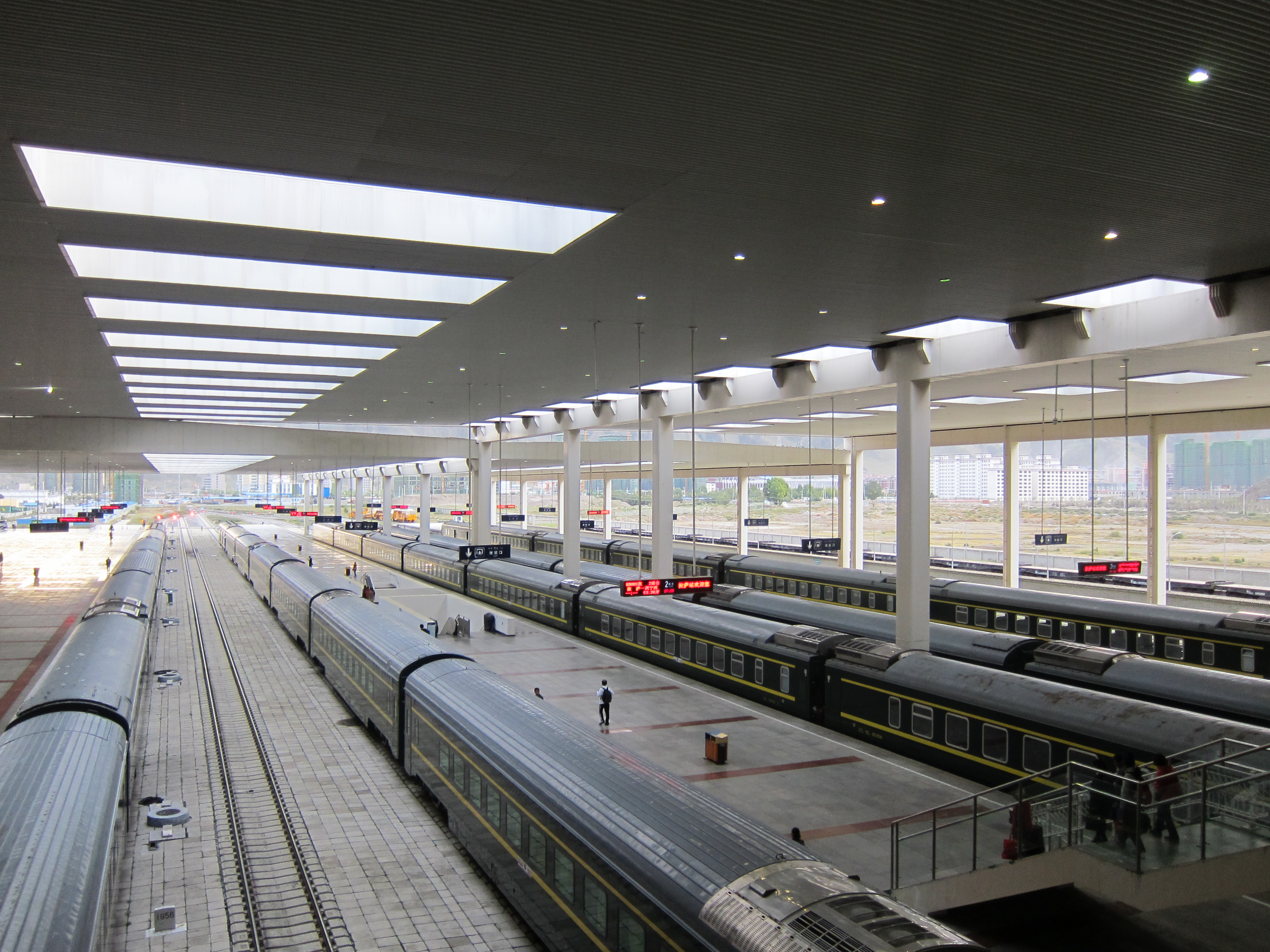
A view of some of the platforms

== See also ==
- Qingzang railway
- List of stations on Qingzang railway

== Sources ==
- Bishop, Peter (2008-07-25). Bridge. Reaktion Books. ISBN 978-1-86189-469-4.
