= List of administrative divisions of the Tibet Autonomous Region =

Tibet Autonomous Region
- Autonomous region
- Capital: Lhasa

Prefecture-level divisions
- Prefectural cities: 6
- Prefectures: 1

County level divisions
- County cities: 2
- Counties: 64
- Districts: 8

Township level divisions
- Towns: 140
- Townships: 535
- Ethnic townships: 8
- Subdistricts: 9

Villages level divisions
- Communities: 2,354
- Administrative villages: 11,948

Tibet Autonomous Region, an autonomous region of the People's Republic of China, has three administrative divisional levels – prefectural, county, and township – as enumerated in the infobox on the right.

== Administrative divisions ==
All of these administrative divisions are explained in greater detail at Administrative divisions of the People's Republic of China. This chart lists only prefecture-level and county-level divisions of Tibet Autonomous Region.

Prefecture level	County Level							
Prefecture level	English name official	Tibetan	Wylie transliteration	Tibetan pinyin official transcription	Chinese	Hanyu Pinyin	Division code	
Lhasa city ལྷ་ས་གྲོང་ཁྱེར། lha sa grong khyer Lhasa Chongkyêr 拉萨市; Lāsà Shì (Capital) (5401 / LXA)	Chengguan District	ཁྲིན་ཀོན་ཆུས།	khrin kon chus	Chênggoin Qü	城关区	Chéngguān Qū	540102	CGN
Lhasa city ལྷ་ས་གྲོང་ཁྱེར། lha sa grong khyer Lhasa Chongkyêr 拉萨市; Lāsà Shì (Capital) (5401 / LXA)	Doilungdêqên District	སྟོད་ལུང་བདེ་ཆེན་ཆུས།	stod lung bde chen chus	Dölungdêqên Qü	堆龙德庆区	Duīlóngdéqìng Qū	540103	DLD
Lhasa city ལྷ་ས་གྲོང་ཁྱེར། lha sa grong khyer Lhasa Chongkyêr 拉萨市; Lāsà Shì (Capital) (5401 / LXA)	Dagzê District	སྟག་རྩེ་ཆུས།	stag rtse chus	Dagzê Qü	达孜区	Dázī Qū	540104	
Lhasa city ལྷ་ས་གྲོང་ཁྱེར། lha sa grong khyer Lhasa Chongkyêr 拉萨市; Lāsà Shì (Capital) (5401 / LXA)	Lhünzhub County	ལྷུན་གྲུབ་རྫོང་།	lhun grub rdzong	Lhünzhub Zong	林周县	Línzhōu Xiàn	540121	LZB
Lhasa city ལྷ་ས་གྲོང་ཁྱེར། lha sa grong khyer Lhasa Chongkyêr 拉萨市; Lāsà Shì (Capital) (5401 / LXA)	Damxung County	འདམ་གཞུང་རྫོང་།	'dam gzhung rdzong	Damxung Zong	当雄县	Dāngxióng Xiàn	540122	DAM
Lhasa city ལྷ་ས་གྲོང་ཁྱེར། lha sa grong khyer Lhasa Chongkyêr 拉萨市; Lāsà Shì (Capital) (5401 / LXA)	Nyêmo County	སྙེ་མོ་རྫོང་།	snye mo rdzong	Nyêmo Zong	尼木县	Nímù Xiàn	540123	NYE
Lhasa city ལྷ་ས་གྲོང་ཁྱེར། lha sa grong khyer Lhasa Chongkyêr 拉萨市; Lāsà Shì (Capital) (5401 / LXA)	Qüxü County	ཆུ་ཤུར་རྫོང་།	chu shur rdzong	Qüxü Zong	曲水县	Qūshuǐ Xiàn	540124	QUX
Lhasa city ལྷ་ས་གྲོང་ཁྱེར། lha sa grong khyer Lhasa Chongkyêr 拉萨市; Lāsà Shì (Capital) (5401 / LXA)	Maizhokunggar County	མལ་གྲོ་གུང་དཀར་རྫོང་།	mal gro gung dkar rdzong	Maizhokunggar Zong	墨竹工卡县	Mòzhúgōngkǎ Xiàn	540127	MAI
Xigazê city གཞིས་ཀ་རྩེ་གྲོང་ཁྱེར། ggzhis ka rtse grong khyer Xigazê Chongkyêr 日喀则市; Rìkāzé Shì (5402 / XGB)	Samzhubzê District	བསམ་འགྲུབ་རྩེ་ཆུས།	bsam 'grub rtse chus	Samzhubzê Qü	桑珠孜区	Sāngzhūzī Qū	540202	SAZ
Xigazê city གཞིས་ཀ་རྩེ་གྲོང་ཁྱེར། ggzhis ka rtse grong khyer Xigazê Chongkyêr 日喀则市; Rìkāzé Shì (5402 / XGB)	Namling County	རྣམ་གླིང་རྫོང་།	rnam gling rdzong	Namling Zong	南木林县	Nánmùlín Xiàn	540221	NAM
Xigazê city གཞིས་ཀ་རྩེ་གྲོང་ཁྱེར། ggzhis ka rtse grong khyer Xigazê Chongkyêr 日喀则市; Rìkāzé Shì (5402 / XGB)	Gyangzê County	རྒྱལ་རྩེ་རྫོང་།	rgyal rtse rdzong	Gyangzê Zong	江孜县	Jiāngzī Xiàn	540222	GYZ
Xigazê city གཞིས་ཀ་རྩེ་གྲོང་ཁྱེར། ggzhis ka rtse grong khyer Xigazê Chongkyêr 日喀则市; Rìkāzé Shì (5402 / XGB)	Tingri County	དིང་རི་རྫོང་།	ding ri rdzong	Tingri Zong	定日县	Dìngrì Xiàn	540223	TIN
Xigazê city གཞིས་ཀ་རྩེ་གྲོང་ཁྱེར། ggzhis ka rtse grong khyer Xigazê Chongkyêr 日喀则市; Rìkāzé Shì (5402 / XGB)	Sa'gya County	ས་སྐྱ་རྫོང་།	sa skya rdzong	Sa'gya Zong	萨迦县	Sàjiā Xiàn	540224	SGX
Xigazê city གཞིས་ཀ་རྩེ་གྲོང་ཁྱེར། ggzhis ka rtse grong khyer Xigazê Chongkyêr 日喀则市; Rìkāzé Shì (5402 / XGB)	Lhazê County	ལྷ་རྩེ་རྫོང་།	lha rtse rdzong	Lhazê Zong	拉孜县	Lāzī Xiàn	540225	LAZ
Xigazê city གཞིས་ཀ་རྩེ་གྲོང་ཁྱེར། ggzhis ka rtse grong khyer Xigazê Chongkyêr 日喀则市; Rìkāzé Shì (5402 / XGB)	Ngamring County	ངམ་རིང་རྫོང་།	ngam ring rdzong	Ngamring Zong	昂仁县	Ángrén Xiàn	540226	NGA
Xigazê city གཞིས་ཀ་རྩེ་གྲོང་ཁྱེར། ggzhis ka rtse grong khyer Xigazê Chongkyêr 日喀则市; Rìkāzé Shì (5402 / XGB)	Xaitongmoin County	བཞད་མཐོང་སྨོན་རྫོང་།	bzhad mthong smon rdzong	Xaitongmoin Zong	谢通门县	Xiètōngmén Xiàn	540227	XTM
Xigazê city གཞིས་ཀ་རྩེ་གྲོང་ཁྱེར། ggzhis ka rtse grong khyer Xigazê Chongkyêr 日喀则市; Rìkāzé Shì (5402 / XGB)	Bainang County	པ་སྣམ་རྫོང་།	pa snam rdzong	Bainang Zong	白朗县	Báilǎng Xiàn	540228	BAI
Xigazê city གཞིས་ཀ་རྩེ་གྲོང་ཁྱེར། ggzhis ka rtse grong khyer Xigazê Chongkyêr 日喀则市; Rìkāzé Shì (5402 / XGB)	Rinbung County	རིན་སྤུངས་རྫོང་།	rin spungs rdzong	Rinbung Zong	仁布县	Rénbù Xiàn	540229	RIN
Xigazê city གཞིས་ཀ་རྩེ་གྲོང་ཁྱེར། ggzhis ka rtse grong khyer Xigazê Chongkyêr 日喀则市; Rìkāzé Shì (5402 / XGB)	Kangmar County (Note: Some of the border regions are claimed or controlled by the PRC, also claimed or controlled by Bhutan. For more information see Bhutan–China border.)	ཁང་དམར་རྫོང་།	khang dmar rdzong	Kangmar Zong	康马县	Kāngmǎ Xiàn	540230	KAN
Xigazê city གཞིས་ཀ་རྩེ་གྲོང་ཁྱེར། ggzhis ka rtse grong khyer Xigazê Chongkyêr 日喀则市; Rìkāzé Shì (5402 / XGB)	Dinggyê County	གདིང་སྐྱེས་རྫོང་།	gding skyes rdzong	Dinggyê Zong	定结县	Dìngjié Xiàn	540231	DIN
Xigazê city གཞིས་ཀ་རྩེ་གྲོང་ཁྱེར། ggzhis ka rtse grong khyer Xigazê Chongkyêr 日喀则市; Rìkāzé Shì (5402 / XGB)	Zhongba County	འབྲོང་པ་རྫོང་།	'brong pa rdzong	Zhongba Zong	仲巴县	Zhòngbā Xiàn	540232	ZHB
Xigazê city གཞིས་ཀ་རྩེ་གྲོང་ཁྱེར། ggzhis ka rtse grong khyer Xigazê Chongkyêr 日喀则市; Rìkāzé Shì (5402 / XGB)	Yadong County	གྲོ་མོ་རྫོང་།	gro mo rdzong	Chomo (Yadong) Zong	亚东县	Yàdōng Xiàn	540233	YDZ
Xigazê city གཞིས་ཀ་རྩེ་གྲོང་ཁྱེར། ggzhis ka rtse grong khyer Xigazê Chongkyêr 日喀则市; Rìkāzé Shì (5402 / XGB)	Gyirong County	སྐྱིད་གྲོང་རྫོང་།	skyid grong rdzong	Gyirong Zong	吉隆县	Jílóng Xiàn	540234	GIR
Xigazê city གཞིས་ཀ་རྩེ་གྲོང་ཁྱེར། ggzhis ka rtse grong khyer Xigazê Chongkyêr 日喀则市; Rìkāzé Shì (5402 / XGB)	Nyalam County	གཉའ་ལམ་རྫོང་།	gnya' lam rdzong	Nyalam Zong	聂拉木县	Nièlāmù Xiàn	540235	NYA
Xigazê city གཞིས་ཀ་རྩེ་གྲོང་ཁྱེར། ggzhis ka rtse grong khyer Xigazê Chongkyêr 日喀则市; Rìkāzé Shì (5402 / XGB)	Saga County	ས་དགའ་རྫོང་།	sa dga' rdzong	Saga Zong	萨嘎县	Sàgā Xiàn	540236	SAG
Xigazê city གཞིས་ཀ་རྩེ་གྲོང་ཁྱེར། ggzhis ka rtse grong khyer Xigazê Chongkyêr 日喀则市; Rìkāzé Shì (5402 / XGB)	Kamba County	གམ་པ་རྫོང་།	gam pa rdzong	G=Kamba Zong	岗巴县	Gǎngbā Xiàn	540237	GAM
Qamdo city ཆབ་མདོ་གྲོང་ཁྱེར། chab mdo grong khyer Qamdo Chongkyêr 昌都市; Chāngdū Shì (5403 / GDX)	Karuo District	མཁར་རོ་ཆུས།	mkhar ro chus	Karub Qü	卡若区	Kǎruò Qū	540302	KRO
Qamdo city ཆབ་མདོ་གྲོང་ཁྱེར། chab mdo grong khyer Qamdo Chongkyêr 昌都市; Chāngdū Shì (5403 / GDX)	Jomda County	འཇོ་མདའ་རྫོང་།	'jo mda' rdzong	Jomda Zong	江达县	Jiāngdá Xiàn	540321	JOM
Qamdo city ཆབ་མདོ་གྲོང་ཁྱེར། chab mdo grong khyer Qamdo Chongkyêr 昌都市; Chāngdū Shì (5403 / GDX)	Gonjo County	གོ་འཇོ་རྫོང་།	go 'jo rdzong	Gonjo Zong	贡觉县	Gòngjué Xiàn	540322	KON
Qamdo city ཆབ་མདོ་གྲོང་ཁྱེར། chab mdo grong khyer Qamdo Chongkyêr 昌都市; Chāngdū Shì (5403 / GDX)	Riwoqê County	རི་བོ་ཆེ་རྫོང་།	ri bo che rdzong	Riwoqê Zong	类乌齐县	Lèiwūqí Xiàn	540323	RIW
Qamdo city ཆབ་མདོ་གྲོང་ཁྱེར། chab mdo grong khyer Qamdo Chongkyêr 昌都市; Chāngdū Shì (5403 / GDX)	Dêngqên County	སྟེང་ཆེན་རྫོང་།	steng chen rdzong	Dêngqên Zong	丁青县	Dīngqīng Xiàn	540324	DEN
Qamdo city ཆབ་མདོ་གྲོང་ཁྱེར། chab mdo grong khyer Qamdo Chongkyêr 昌都市; Chāngdū Shì (5403 / GDX)	Zhag'yab County	བྲག་གཡབ་རྫོང་།	brag g-yab rdzong	Zhag’yab Zong	察雅县	Cháyǎ Xiàn	540325	CHA
Qamdo city ཆབ་མདོ་གྲོང་ཁྱེར། chab mdo grong khyer Qamdo Chongkyêr 昌都市; Chāngdū Shì (5403 / GDX)	Baxoi County	དཔའ་ཤོད་རྫོང་།	dpa' shod rdzong	Baxoi Zong	八宿县	Bāsù Xiàn	540326	BAX
Qamdo city ཆབ་མདོ་གྲོང་ཁྱེར། chab mdo grong khyer Qamdo Chongkyêr 昌都市; Chāngdū Shì (5403 / GDX)	Zogang County	མཛོ་སྒང་རྫོང་།	mdzo sgang rdzong	Zogang Zong	左贡县	Zuǒgòng Xiàn	540327	ZOX
Qamdo city ཆབ་མདོ་གྲོང་ཁྱེར། chab mdo grong khyer Qamdo Chongkyêr 昌都市; Chāngdū Shì (5403 / GDX)	Markam County	སྨར་ཁམས་རྫོང་།	smar khams rdzong	Markam Zong	芒康县	Mángkāng Xiàn	540328	MAN
Qamdo city ཆབ་མདོ་གྲོང་ཁྱེར། chab mdo grong khyer Qamdo Chongkyêr 昌都市; Chāngdū Shì (5403 / GDX)	Lhorong County	ལྷོ་རོང་རྫོང་།	lho rong rdzong	Lhorong Zong	洛隆县	Luòlóng Xiàn	540329	LHO
Qamdo city ཆབ་མདོ་གྲོང་ཁྱེར། chab mdo grong khyer Qamdo Chongkyêr 昌都市; Chāngdū Shì (5403 / GDX)	Banbar County	དཔལ་འབར་རྫོང་།	dpal 'bar rdzong	Banbar Zong	边坝县	Biānbà Xiàn	540330	BAN
Nyingchi city ཉིང་ཁྲི་གྲོང་ཁྱེར། nying khri grong khyer Nyingchi Chongkyêr 林芝市; Línzhī Shì (5404 / NYC)	Bayi District	བྲག་ཡིབ་ཆུས།	brag yib chus	Chagyib Qü	巴宜区	Bāyí Qū	540402	BYA
Nyingchi city ཉིང་ཁྲི་གྲོང་ཁྱེར། nying khri grong khyer Nyingchi Chongkyêr 林芝市; Línzhī Shì (5404 / NYC)	Gongbo'gyamda County	ཀོང་པོ་རྒྱ་མདའ་རྫོང་།	kong po rgya mda' rdzong	Gongbo'gyamda Zong	工布江达县	Gōngbùjiāngdá Xiàn	540421	GOX
Nyingchi city ཉིང་ཁྲི་གྲོང་ཁྱེར། nying khri grong khyer Nyingchi Chongkyêr 林芝市; Línzhī Shì (5404 / NYC)	Mêdog County (Note: Some of the border regions are claimed or controlled by the PRC, also claimed or controlled by India. For more information see Sino-Indian border dispute.)	མེ་ཏོག་རྫོང་།	me tog rdzong	Mêdog Zong	墨脱县	Mòtuō Xiàn	540423	MET
Nyingchi city ཉིང་ཁྲི་གྲོང་ཁྱེར། nying khri grong khyer Nyingchi Chongkyêr 林芝市; Línzhī Shì (5404 / NYC)	Bomê County	སྤོ་མེས་རྫོང་།	spo mes rdzong	Bomê Zong	波密县	Bōmì Xiàn	540424	BMI
Nyingchi city ཉིང་ཁྲི་གྲོང་ཁྱེར། nying khri grong khyer Nyingchi Chongkyêr 林芝市; Línzhī Shì (5404 / NYC)	Zayü County	རྫ་ཡུལ་རྫོང་།	rdza yul rdzong	Zayü Zong	察隅县	Cháyú Xiàn	540425	ZAY
Nyingchi city ཉིང་ཁྲི་གྲོང་ཁྱེར། nying khri grong khyer Nyingchi Chongkyêr 林芝市; Línzhī Shì (5404 / NYC)	Nangxian County (Note: Official name registered by the Ministry of Civil Affairs.)	སྣང་རྫོང་།	snang rdzong	Nang Zong	朗县	Lǎngxiàn	540426	NGX
Nyingchi city ཉིང་ཁྲི་གྲོང་ཁྱེར། nying khri grong khyer Nyingchi Chongkyêr 林芝市; Línzhī Shì (5404 / NYC)	Mainling city	སྨན་གླིང་གྲོང་ཁྱེར།	sman gling grong khyer	Mainling Chongkyêr	米林市	Mǐlín Shì	540481	MAX
Shannan city ལྷོ་ཁ་གྲོང་ཁྱེར། lho kha grong khyer Lhoka Chongkyêr 山南市; Shānnán Shì (5405 / SNB)	Nêdong District	སྣེ་གདོང་ཆུས།	sne gdong chus	Nêdong Qü	乃东区	Nǎidōng Qū	540502	NDQ
Shannan city ལྷོ་ཁ་གྲོང་ཁྱེར། lho kha grong khyer Lhoka Chongkyêr 山南市; Shānnán Shì (5405 / SNB)	Zhanang County	གྲ་ནང་རྫོང་།	gra nang rdzong	Zhanang Zong	扎囊县	Zhānáng Xiàn	540521	CNG
Shannan city ལྷོ་ཁ་གྲོང་ཁྱེར། lho kha grong khyer Lhoka Chongkyêr 山南市; Shānnán Shì (5405 / SNB)	Gonggar County	གོང་དཀར་རྫོང་།	gong dkar rdzong	Gonggar Zong	贡嘎县	Gònggā Xiàn	540522	GON
Shannan city ལྷོ་ཁ་གྲོང་ཁྱེར། lho kha grong khyer Lhoka Chongkyêr 山南市; Shānnán Shì (5405 / SNB)	Sangri County	ཟངས་རི་རྫོང་།	zangs ri rdzong	Sangri Zong	桑日县	Sāngrì Xiàn	540523	SRI
Shannan city ལྷོ་ཁ་གྲོང་ཁྱེར། lho kha grong khyer Lhoka Chongkyêr 山南市; Shānnán Shì (5405 / SNB)	Qonggyai County	འཕྱོངས་རྒྱས་རྫོང་།	'phyongs rgyas rdzong	Qonggyai Zong	琼结县	Qióngjié Xiàn	540524	QON
Shannan city ལྷོ་ཁ་གྲོང་ཁྱེར། lho kha grong khyer Lhoka Chongkyêr 山南市; Shānnán Shì (5405 / SNB)	Qusum County	ཆུ་གསུམ་རྫོང་།	chu gsum rdzong	Qusum Zong	曲松县	Qūsōng Xiàn	540525	QUS
Shannan city ལྷོ་ཁ་གྲོང་ཁྱེར། lho kha grong khyer Lhoka Chongkyêr 山南市; Shānnán Shì (5405 / SNB)	Comai County	མཚོ་སམད་རྫོང་།	mtsho smad rdzong	Comai Zong	措美县	Cuòměi Xiàn	540526	COM
Shannan city ལྷོ་ཁ་གྲོང་ཁྱེར། lho kha grong khyer Lhoka Chongkyêr 山南市; Shānnán Shì (5405 / SNB)	Lhozhag County	ལྷོ་བྲག་རྫོང་།	lho brag rdzong	Lhozhag Zong	洛扎县	Luòzhā Xiàn	540527	LHX
Shannan city ལྷོ་ཁ་གྲོང་ཁྱེར། lho kha grong khyer Lhoka Chongkyêr 山南市; Shānnán Shì (5405 / SNB)	Gyaca County	རྒྱ་ཚ་རྫོང་།	rgya tsha rdzong	Gyaca Zong	加查县	Jiāchá Xiàn	540528	GYA
Shannan city ལྷོ་ཁ་གྲོང་ཁྱེར། lho kha grong khyer Lhoka Chongkyêr 山南市; Shānnán Shì (5405 / SNB)	Lhünzê County	ལྷུན་རྩེ་རྫོང་།	lhun rtse rdzong	Lhünzê Zong	隆子县	Lóngzǐ Xiàn	540529	LHZ
Shannan city ལྷོ་ཁ་གྲོང་ཁྱེར། lho kha grong khyer Lhoka Chongkyêr 山南市; Shānnán Shì (5405 / SNB)	Nagarzê County	སྣ་དཀར་རྩེ་རྫོང་།	sna dkar rtse rdzong	Nagarzê Zong	浪卡子县	Làngkǎzǐ Xiàn	540531	NAX
Shannan city ལྷོ་ཁ་གྲོང་ཁྱེར། lho kha grong khyer Lhoka Chongkyêr 山南市; Shānnán Shì (5405 / SNB)	Cona city	མཚོ་སྣ་གྲོང་ཁྱེར།	mtsho sna grong khyer	Cona Chongkyêr	错那市	Cuònà Shì	540581	CON
Nagqu city ནག་ཆུ་གྲོང་ཁྱེར། nag chu grong khyer Nagqu Chongkyêr 那曲市; Nàqū Shì (5406 / )	Seni District	གསེར་རྙེད་ཆུས།	gser rnyed chus	Sêrnyê Qü	色尼区	Sèní Qū	540602	
Nagqu city ནག་ཆུ་གྲོང་ཁྱེར། nag chu grong khyer Nagqu Chongkyêr 那曲市; Nàqū Shì (5406 / )	Lhari County	ལྷ་རི་རྫོང་།	lha ri rdzong	Lhari Zong	嘉黎县	Jiālí Xiàn	540621	LHR
Nagqu city ནག་ཆུ་གྲོང་ཁྱེར། nag chu grong khyer Nagqu Chongkyêr 那曲市; Nàqū Shì (5406 / )	Biru County	འབྲི་རུ་རྫོང་།	'bri ru rdzong	Biru Zong	比如县	Bǐrú Xiàn	540622	BRU
Nagqu city ནག་ཆུ་གྲོང་ཁྱེར། nag chu grong khyer Nagqu Chongkyêr 那曲市; Nàqū Shì (5406 / )	Nyainrong County	གཉན་རོང་རྫོང་།	gnyan rong rdzong	Nyainrong Zong	聂荣县	Nièróng Xiàn	540623	NRO
Nagqu city ནག་ཆུ་གྲོང་ཁྱེར། nag chu grong khyer Nagqu Chongkyêr 那曲市; Nàqū Shì (5406 / )	Amdo County	ཨ་མདོ་རྫོང་།	a mdo rdzong	Amdo Zong	安多县	Ānduō Xiàn	540624	AMD
Nagqu city ནག་ཆུ་གྲོང་ཁྱེར། nag chu grong khyer Nagqu Chongkyêr 那曲市; Nàqū Shì (5406 / )	Xainza County	ཤན་རྩ་རྫོང་།	shan rtsa rdzong	Xainza Zong	申扎县	Shēnzhā Xiàn	540625	XZX
Nagqu city ནག་ཆུ་གྲོང་ཁྱེར། nag chu grong khyer Nagqu Chongkyêr 那曲市; Nàqū Shì (5406 / )	Sogxian County	སོག་རྫོང་།	sog rdzong	Sog Zong	索县	Suǒxiàn	540626	SOG
Nagqu city ནག་ཆུ་གྲོང་ཁྱེར། nag chu grong khyer Nagqu Chongkyêr 那曲市; Nàqū Shì (5406 / )	Baingoin County	དཔལ་མགོན་རྫོང་།	dpal mgon rdzong	Baingoin Zong	班戈县	Bāngē Xiàn	540627	BGX
Nagqu city ནག་ཆུ་གྲོང་ཁྱེར། nag chu grong khyer Nagqu Chongkyêr 那曲市; Nàqū Shì (5406 / )	Baqên County	སྦྲ་ཆེན་རྫོང་།	sbra chen rdzong	Baqên Zong	巴青县	Bāqīng Xiàn	540628	BQE
Nagqu city ནག་ཆུ་གྲོང་ཁྱེར། nag chu grong khyer Nagqu Chongkyêr 那曲市; Nàqū Shì (5406 / )	Nyima County	ཉི་མ་རྫོང་།	nyi ma rdzong	Nyima Zong	尼玛县	Nímǎ Xiàn	540629	NYX
Nagqu city ནག་ཆུ་གྲོང་ཁྱེར། nag chu grong khyer Nagqu Chongkyêr 那曲市; Nàqū Shì (5406 / )	Shuanghu County	མཚོ་གཉིས་་རྫོང་།	mtsho gnyis rdzong	Co'nyi Zong	双湖县	Shuānghú Xiàn	540630	SHA
Ngari Prefecture མངའ་རིས་ས་ཁུལ། mnga' ris sa khul Ngari Sakü 阿里地区; Ālǐ Dìqū (5425 / NGD)	Burang County	སྤུ་ཧྲེང་རྫོང་།	spu hreng rdzong	Buranga Zong	普兰县	Pǔlán Xiàn	542521	BUR
Ngari Prefecture མངའ་རིས་ས་ཁུལ། mnga' ris sa khul Ngari Sakü 阿里地区; Ālǐ Dìqū (5425 / NGD)	Zanda County	རྩ་མདའ་རྫོང་།	rtsa mda' rdzong	Zandaa Zong	札达县	Zhádá Xiàn	542522	ZAN
Ngari Prefecture མངའ་རིས་ས་ཁུལ། mnga' ris sa khul Ngari Sakü 阿里地区; Ālǐ Dìqū (5425 / NGD)	Gar County	སྒར་རྫོང་།	sgar rdzong	Gar Zong	噶尔县	Gá'ěr Xiàn	542523	GAR
Ngari Prefecture མངའ་རིས་ས་ཁུལ། mnga' ris sa khul Ngari Sakü 阿里地区; Ālǐ Dìqū (5425 / NGD)	Rutog County	རུ་ཐོག་རྫོང་།	ru thog rdzong	Rutog Zong	日土县	Rìtǔ Xiàn	542524	RUT
Ngari Prefecture མངའ་རིས་ས་ཁུལ། mnga' ris sa khul Ngari Sakü 阿里地区; Ālǐ Dìqū (5425 / NGD)	Gê'gyai County	དགེ་རྒྱས་རྫོང་།	dge rgyas rdzong	Gê'gyaia Zong	革吉县	Géjí Xiàn	542525	GEG
Ngari Prefecture མངའ་རིས་ས་ཁུལ། mnga' ris sa khul Ngari Sakü 阿里地区; Ālǐ Dìqū (5425 / NGD)	Gêrzê County	སྒེར་རྩེ་རྫོང་།	sger rtse rdzong	Gêrzêa Zong	改则县	Gǎizé Xiàn	542526	GER
Ngari Prefecture མངའ་རིས་ས་ཁུལ། mnga' ris sa khul Ngari Sakü 阿里地区; Ālǐ Dìqū (5425 / NGD)	Coqên County	མཚོ་ཆེན་རྫོང་།	mtsho chen rdzong	Coqêna Zong	措勤县	Cuòqín Xiàn	542527	COQ

== Administrative divisions history ==
=== Recent changes in administrative divisions ===
Date	Before	After	Note	Reference
1983-01-18	all Province-controlled city (P-City) → Prefecture-level city (PL-City)			Civil Affairs Announcement
1983-01-18	all Prefecture-controlled city (PC-City) → County-level city (CL-City)			Civil Affairs Announcement
1983-10-07	parts of Lhasa (PL-City)	Nyingchi Prefecture	established	
1983-10-07	↳ Mêdog County	↳ Mêdog County	transferred	
1983-10-07	↳ Mainling County	↳ Mainling County	transferred	
1983-10-07	↳ Nyingchi County	↳ Nyingchi County	transferred	
1983-10-07	↳ Gongbo'gyamda County	↳ Gongbo'gyamda County	transferred	
1983-10-07	parts of Shannan Prefecture	Nyingchi Prefecture	transferred	
1983-10-07	↳ Nang County	↳ Nang County	transferred	
1983-10-07	parts of Qamdo Prefecture	Nyingchi Prefecture	transferred	
1983-10-07	↳ Bomê County	↳ Bomê County	transferred	
1983-10-07	↳ Zayü County	↳ Zayü County	transferred	
1983-10-07	↳ Zayü County	↳ Pütog County	established	
1983-10-07	↳ parts of Zogang County	↳ Pütog County	established	
1983-10-07	parts of Xigazê Prefecture	Gyangzê Prefecture	established	
1983-10-07	↳ Yadong County	↳ Yadong County	transferred	
1983-10-07	↳ Kangmar County	↳ Kangmar County	transferred	
1983-10-07	↳ Kamba County	↳ Kamba County	transferred	
1983-10-07	↳ Gyangzê County	↳ Gyangzê County	transferred	
1983-10-07	↳ Rinbung County	↳ Rinbung County	transferred	
1983-10-07	↳ Bainang County	↳ Bainang County	transferred	
1983-10-07	parts of Shannan Prefecture	Gyangzê Prefecture	transferred	
1983-10-07	↳ Nagarzê County	↳ Nagarzê County	transferred	
1983-10-07	parts of Baingoin County	Nyima County	established	
1983-10-07	parts of Xainza County	Nyima County	established	
1983-10-07	parts of Markam County	Yanjing County	established	
1983-10-07	parts of Qamdo County	Toba County	established	
1983-10-07	parts of Zhag'yab County	Toba County	established	
1983-10-07	parts of Jomda County	Toba County	established	
1983-10-07	parts of Qamdo County	Sibda County	established	
1983-10-07	parts of Jomda County	Sibda County	established	
1983-10-07	parts of Zhongba County	Lunggar County	established	
1986-04-07	Qonggyai County (穷结县)	Qonggyai County (琼结县)	renamed	
1986-09-12	Gyangzê Prefecture	Xigazê Prefecture	disestablished & merged into	
1986-09-12	↳ Yadong County	↳ Yadong County	transferred	
1986-09-12	↳ Kangmar County	↳ Kangmar County	transferred	
1986-09-12	↳ Kamba County	↳ Kamba County	transferred	
1986-09-12	↳ Gyangzê County	↳ Gyangzê County	transferred	
1986-09-12	↳ Rinbung County	↳ Rinbung County	transferred	
1986-09-12	↳ Bainang County	↳ Bainang County	transferred	
1986-09-12	Gyangzê Prefecture	Shannan Prefecture	disestablished & merged into	
1986-09-12	↳ Nagarzê County	↳ Nagarzê County	transferred	
1986-12-12	Xigazê County	Xigazê (CL-City)	reorganized	
1999-09-21	Lunggar County	Zhongba County	merged into	Civil Affairs [1999]54
1999-09-21	Yanjing County	Markam County	merged into	Civil Affairs [1999]54
1999-09-21	Pütog County	Zogang County	merged into	Civil Affairs [1999]54
1999-09-21	Toba County	Qamdo County	merged into	Civil Affairs [1999]54
1999-09-21	Sibda County	Jomda County	merged into	Civil Affairs [1999]54
2012-11-15	parts of Nyima County	Shuanghu County	established	State Council [2012]191
2014-06-26	Xigazê Prefecture	Xigazê (PL-City)	reorganized	State Council [2014]79
2014-06-26	Xigazê (CL-City)	Samzhubzê District	reorganized	State Council [2014]79
2014-10-20	Qamdo Prefecture	Qamdo (PL-City)	reorganized	State Council [2014]143
2014-10-20	Qamdo County	Karub District	reorganized	State Council [2014]143
2015-03-16	Nyingchi Prefecture	Nyingchi (PL-City)	reorganized	State Council [2015]51
2015-03-16	Nyingchi County	Bayi District	reorganized	State Council [2015]51
2015-10-13	Doilungdêqên County	Doilungdêqên District	reorganized	State Council [2015]185
2016-01-07	Shannan Prefecture	Shannan (PL-City)	reorganized	State Council [2016]8
2016-01-07	Nêdong County	Nêdong District	reorganized	State Council [2016]8
2017-07-18	Dagzê County	Dagzê District	reorganized	State Council [2017]107
2017-07-18	Nagqu Prefecture	Nagqu (PL-City)	reorganized	State Council [2017]109
2017-07-18	Nagqu County	Seni District	reorganized	State Council [2017]109

== Population composition ==
=== Prefectures ===
Prefecture	2010	2000
Ngari	95,465	
Nagqu	462,382	
Qamdo	657,505	
Xigazê	703,292	
Lhasa	559,423	474,499
Shannan	328,990	
Nyingchi Prefecture	195,109	

=== Counties ===
Name	Prefecture	2010
Chengguan	Lhasa	279,074
Doilungdêqên	Lhasa	52,249
Dagzê	Lhasa	26,708
Lhünzhub	Lhasa	50,246
Damxung	Lhasa	46,463
Nyêmo	Lhasa	28,149
Qüxü	Lhasa	31,860
Maizhokunggar	Lhasa	44,674
Qamdo → Karub	Qamdo	87,387
Jomdo	Qamdo	75,238
Gonjo	Qamdo	38,741
Riwoqê	Qamdo	40,813
Dêngqên	Qamdo	63,209
Zhag'yab	Qamdo	53,130
Baxoi	Qamdo	41,163
Zogang	Qamdo	40,819
Markam	Qamdo	81,659
Lhorong	Qamdo	44,241
Banbar	Qamdo	32,462
Nêdong	Lhoka	57,334
Zhanang	Lhoka	38,268
Gonggar	Lhoka	47,255
Sangri	Lhoka	16,453
Qonggyai	Lhoka	18,089
Qusum	Lhoka	16,943
Comai	Lhoka	14,320
Lhozhag	Lhoka	18,511
Gyaca	Lhoka	18,746
Lhünzê	Lhoka	34,097
Cona	Lhoka	14,901
Nagarzê	Lhoka	35,235
Xigazê → Samzhubzê	Xigazê	102,894
Namling	Xigazê	79,909
Gyantse	Xigazê	63,398
Tingri	Xigazê	49,108
Sa'gya	Xigazê	46,118
Lhatse	Xigazê	49,575
Ngamring	Xigazê	47,195
Xaitongmoin	Xigazê	43,532
Bainang	Xigazê	44,240
Rinbung	Xigazê	31,288
Kangmar	Xigazê	20,912
Dinggyê	Xigazê	18,458
Zhongba	Xigazê	19,493
Yadong	Xigazê	12,189
Gyirong	Xigazê	13,329
Nyalam	Xigazê	15,147
Saga	Xigazê	12,939
Kamba	Xigazê	10,047
Nagqu → Seni	Nagqu	91,859
Lhari	Nagqu	27,955
Biru	Nagqu	51,473
Nyainrong	Nagqu	31,292
Amdo	Nagqu	35,947
Xainza	Nagqu	18,030
Sog(xian)	Nagqu	39,036
Baingoin	Nagqu	35,780
Baqên	Nagqu	45,257
Nyima	Nagqu	37,925
Shuanghu	Nagqu	10,000
Gar	Ngari	13,367
Burang	Ngari	8,658
Zanda	Ngari	6,567
Rutog	Ngari	8,292
Gê'gyai	Ngari	13,524
Gêrzê	Ngari	20,870
Coqên	Ngari	12,183
Nyingchi	Nyingchi	40,496
Gongbo'gyamda	Nyingchi	25,677
Mainling	Nyingchi	18,509
Mêdog	Nyingchi	10,623
Bomê	Nyingchi	28,288
Zayü	Nyingchi	25,784
Nang(xian)	Nyingchi	14,954

== See also ==
- List of township-level divisions of the Tibet Autonomous Region
