= Gyantse County =

Gyangzê County 江孜县 • རྒྱལ་རྩེ་རྫོང་། Gyangtse
- County
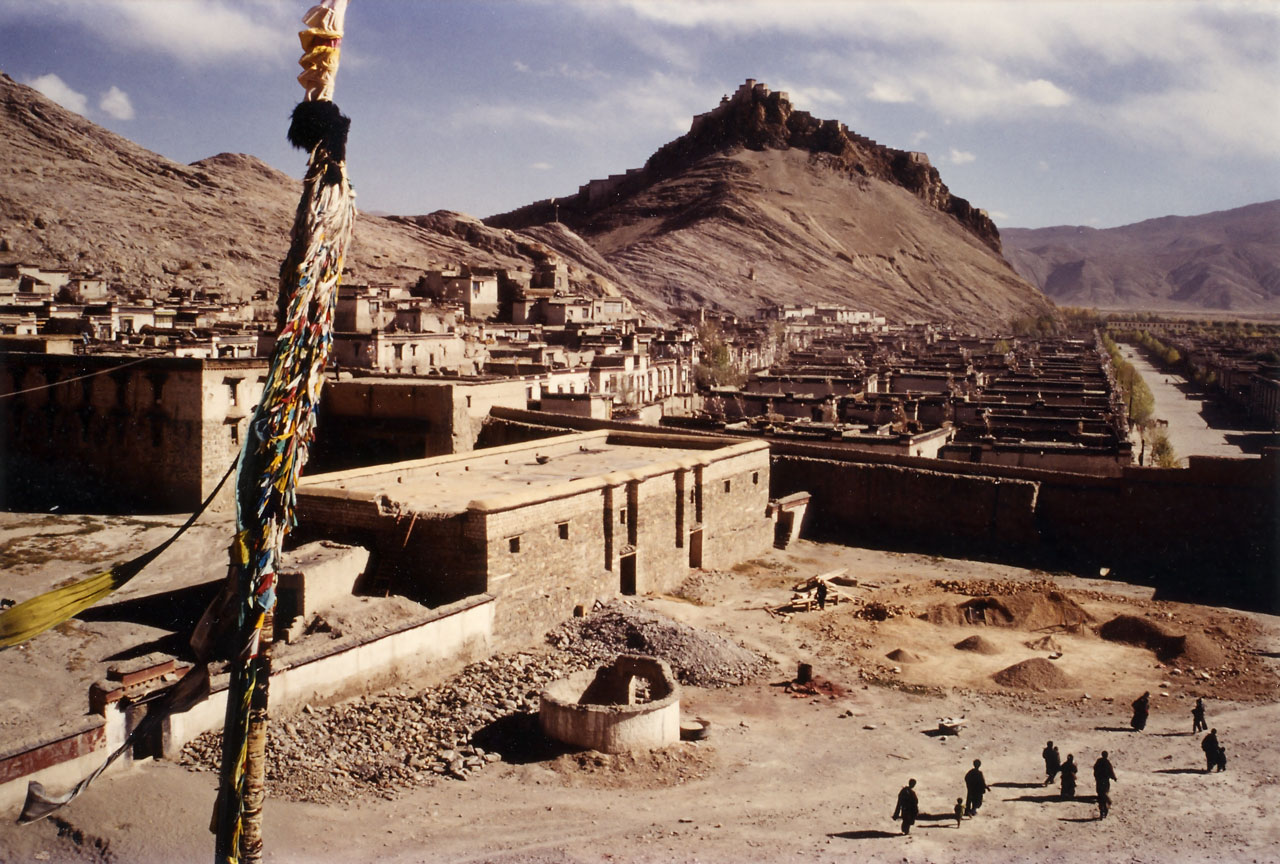

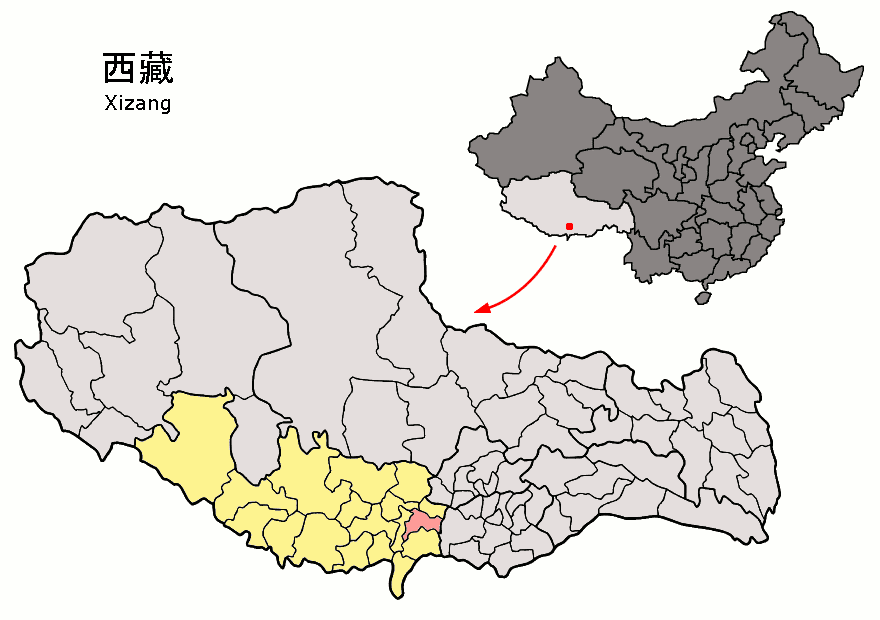
- Location of Gyantse County (red) within Xigazê City (yellow) and the Tibet Autonomous Region

- Location of the seat in the Tibet Autonomous Region Gyantse (China)
- Coordinates: 28°53′45″N 89°37′33″E
- Country: China
- Autonomous region: Tibet
- Prefecture-level city: Xigazê
- County seat: Gyantse

Area
  - Total: 3,849.23 km^{2} (1,486.20 sq mi)

Population (2020)
  - Total: 68,650
  - Density: 17.83/km^{2} (46.19/sq mi)
- Time zone: UTC+8 (China Standard)
- Division code: GYZ
- Website: www.jiangzi.gov.cn

Gyantse County

Chinese name
- Simplified Chinese: 江孜县
- Traditional Chinese: 江孜縣
Transcriptions
Standard Mandarin
- Hanyu Pinyin: Jiāngzī Xiàn

Tibetan name
- Tibetan: རྒྱལ་རྩེ་རྫོང་།
Transcriptions
- Wylie: rgyal rtse rdzong
- Tibetan Pinyin: Gyangzê Zong

Gyantse County officially Gyangzê County (Tibetan: རྒྱལ་རྩེ་རྫོང་།; Chinese: 江孜县) is a county of Xigazê in the Tibet Autonomous Region, China. Its main settlement is Gyantse Town known for its monasteries.

== Administration divisions ==
Gyantse County is divided into 1 town and 18 townships.

Name	Chinese	Hanyu Pinyin	Tibetan	Wylie
Town
Gyangzê Town (Gyantse)	江孜镇	Jiāngzī zhèn	རྒྱལ་རྩེ་གྲོང་རྡལ།	rgyal rtse grong rdal
Townships
Naröl Township	纳如乡	Nàrú xiāng	ན་རོལ་ཤང་།	na rol shang
Karmai Township	卡麦乡	Kǎmài xiāng	མཁར་སྨད་ཤང་།	mkhar smad shang
Kardoi Township	卡堆乡	Kǎduī xiāng	མཁར་སྟོད་ཤང་།	mkhar stod shang
Tsangkha Township	藏改乡	Zànggǎi xiāng	གཙང་ཁ་ཤང་།	gtsang kha shang
Rinang Township	日朗乡	Rìlǎng xiāng	རི་ནང་ཤང་།	ri nang shang
Dagzê Township	达孜乡	Dázī xiāng	སྟག་རྩེ་ཤང་།	stag rtse shang
Rasog Township	热索乡	Rèsuǒ xiāng	ར་སོག་ཤང་།	ra sog shang
Drongtsé Township	重孜乡	Chóngzī xiāng	འབྲོང་རྩེ་ཤང་།	'brong rtse shang
Lungmar Township	龙马乡	Lóngmǎ xiāng	ལུང་དམར་ཤང་།	lung dmar shang
Jaggyê Township	加克西乡	Jiākèxī xiāng	ལྕགས་སྒྱེ་ཤང་།	lcangs skye shang
Tsechen Township	紫金乡	Zǐjīn xiāng	རྩེ་ཆེན་ཤང་།	rtse chen shang
Jangra Township	江热乡	Jiāngrè xiāng	ལྕང་ར་ཤང་།	lcang ra shang
Nyangdoi Township	年堆乡	Niánduī xiāng	མྱང་སྟོད་ཤང་།	myang stod shang
Kangco Township	康卓乡	Kāngzhuó xiāng	གངས་མཚོ་ཤང་།	gangs mtsho shang
Gyinkar Township	金嘎乡	Jīngā xiāng	དཀྱིལ་མཁར་ཤང་།	dkyil mkhar shang
Rizhing Township	日星乡	Rìxīng xiāng	རི་ཞིང་ཤང་།	ri zhing shang
Charing Township	车仁乡	Chērén xiāng	ཁྲ་རིང་ཤང་།	khra ring shang
Ralung Township	热龙乡	Rèlóng xiāng	ར་ལུང་ཤང་།	ra lung shang

== Climate ==
Climate data for Gyantse, elevation 4,040 m (13,250 ft), (1991–2020 normals, extremes 1981–present)
Month	Jan	Feb	Mar	Apr	May	Jun	Jul	Aug	Sep	Oct	Nov	Dec	Year
Record high °C (°F)	17.0 (62.6)	17.3 (63.1)	22.1 (71.8)	23.2 (73.8)	25.9 (78.6)	28.7 (83.7)	28.2 (82.8)	25.7 (78.3)	24.6 (76.3)	21.9 (71.4)	18.9 (66.0)	16.1 (61.0)	28.7 (83.7)
Mean daily maximum °C (°F)	5.9 (42.6)	7.6 (45.7)	10.7 (51.3)	13.9 (57.0)	17.7 (63.9)	21.1 (70.0)	20.5 (68.9)	19.7 (67.5)	18.9 (66.0)	15.4 (59.7)	10.6 (51.1)	7.3 (45.1)	14.1 (57.4)
Daily mean °C (°F)	−3.8 (25.2)	−1.1 (30.0)	2.6 (36.7)	5.7 (42.3)	9.6 (49.3)	13.2 (55.8)	13.0 (55.4)	12.1 (53.8)	10.8 (51.4)	6.6 (43.9)	0.8 (33.4)	−2.9 (26.8)	5.6 (42.0)
Mean daily minimum °C (°F)	−13.1 (8.4)	−10.1 (13.8)	−5.8 (21.6)	−1.9 (28.6)	2.1 (35.8)	6.1 (43.0)	7.4 (45.3)	6.6 (43.9)	4.2 (39.6)	−1.1 (30.0)	−7.6 (18.3)	−11.4 (11.5)	−2.0 (28.3)
Record low °C (°F)	−23.9 (−11.0)	−20.4 (−4.7)	−16.2 (2.8)	−12.6 (9.3)	−7.6 (18.3)	−2.3 (27.9)	0.2 (32.4)	−1.0 (30.2)	−3.6 (25.5)	−11.6 (11.1)	−14.0 (6.8)	−21.4 (−6.5)	−23.9 (−11.0)
Average precipitation mm (inches)	0.3 (0.01)	0.5 (0.02)	1.7 (0.07)	7.7 (0.30)	16.9 (0.67)	37.7 (1.48)	89.3 (3.52)	89.2 (3.51)	34.7 (1.37)	3.5 (0.14)	0.5 (0.02)	1.8 (0.07)	283.8 (11.18)
Average precipitation days (≥ 0.1 mm)	0.4	0.7	1.2	4.0	6.6	10.9	18.8	18.5	10.7	2.1	0.4	0.3	74.6
Average snowy days	0.8	1.1	2.2	5.9	3.2	0.2	0.1	0	0.3	1.4	0.7	0.5	16.4
Average relative humidity (%)	30	30	33	40	46	54	67	70	62	45	38	38	46
Mean monthly sunshine hours	272.2	251.5	276.2	273.1	295.9	273.4	224.6	224.6	244.3	294.0	283.6	280.9	3,194.3
Percentage possible sunshine	83	79	74	70	70	66	53	56	67	84	89	88	73
Source: China Meteorological Administration August all time extreme high
