= Xaitongmoin County =

Xaitongmoin County 谢通门县 • བཞད་མཐོང་སྨོན་རྫོང་། Zhetongmön
- County
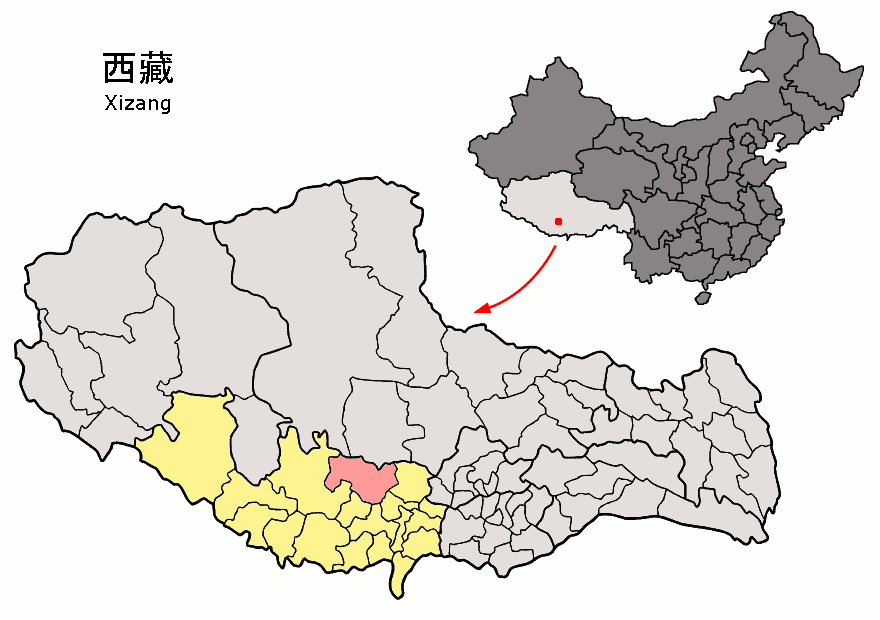
- Location of Xaitongmoin County (red) within Xigazê City (yellow) and the Tibet AR

- Location in Tibet Xaitongmoin (China)
- Coordinates (Xaitongmoin government): 29°25′30″N 88°15′22″E
- Country: China
- Autonomous region: Tibet
- Prefecture-level city: Xigazê
- County seat: Chabkha (Thongmon)

Area
  - Total: 13,964.95 km^{2} (5,391.90 sq mi)

Population (2020)
  - Total: 45,573
  - Density: 3.2634/km^{2} (8.4521/sq mi)
- Time zone: UTC+8 (China Standard)
- Website: www.xietongmen.gov.cn

Xaitongmoin County

Chinese name
- Simplified Chinese: 谢通门县
- Traditional Chinese: 謝通門縣
Transcriptions
Standard Mandarin
- Hanyu Pinyin: Xiètōngmén Xiàn

Tibetan name
- Tibetan: བཞད་མཐོང་སྨོན་རྫོང་།
Transcriptions
- Wylie: bzhad mthong smon rdzong
- Tibetan Pinyin: Xaitongmoin Zong

Xaitongmoin County or Zhetongmön (Tibetan: བཞད་མཐོང་སྨོན་རྫོང་།, Chinese: 谢通门县) is a county of Xigazê in the Tibet Autonomous Region, China.

== History ==
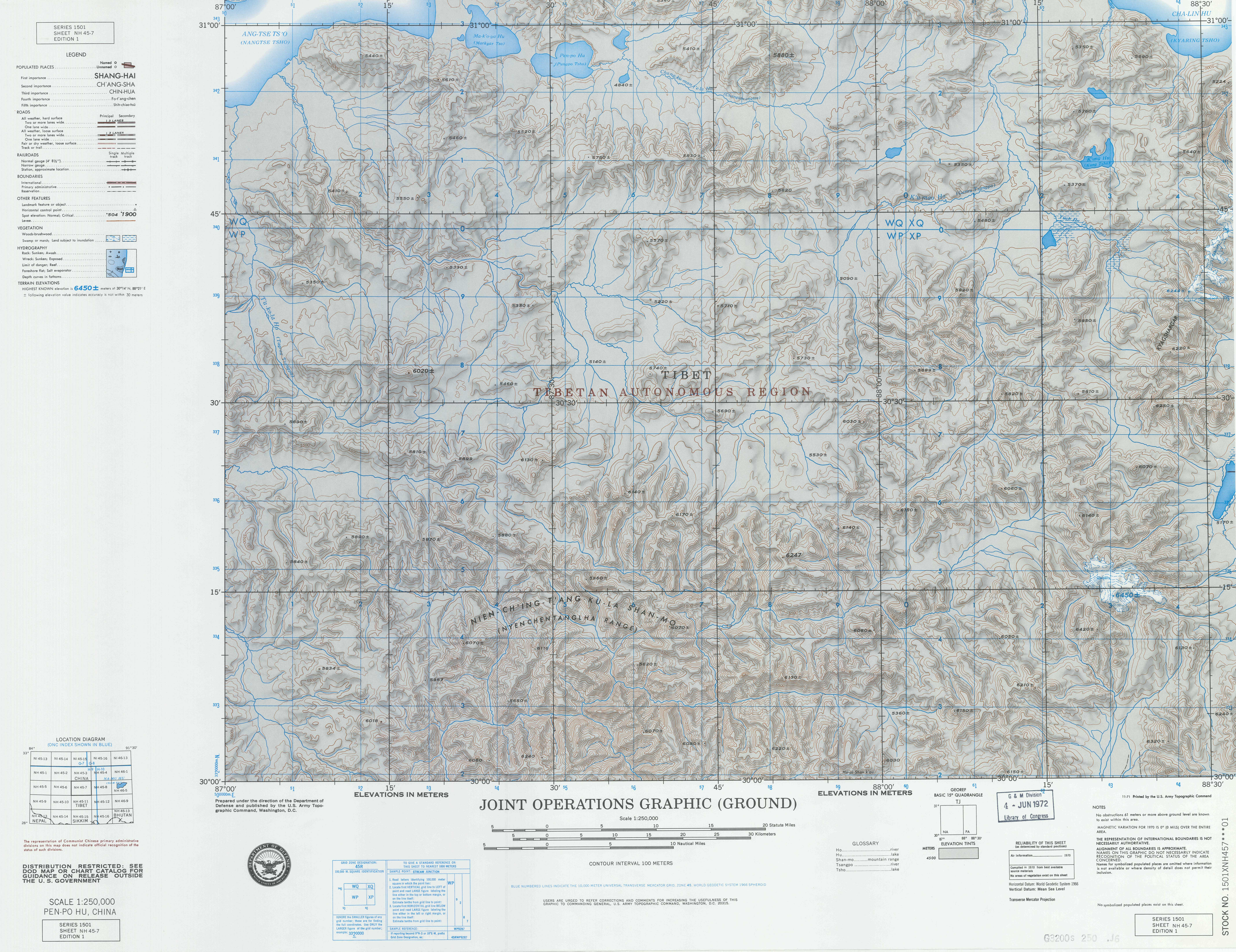

Ganden Lhading, which became a branch of Tashi Lhunpo Monastery, was founded in 1050. It converted to Gelug in 1650. Renga Chode, a Shangpa Kagyu Monastery, was also founded in 1050. It converted to Gelug in 1600.

Tashi Gepel was a minor 14th century Kagyu nunnery.

Takmo Lingka, a Sakya monastery, was founded here in 1436.

Dratsang Monastery (Zhe Dratsang, chazang si), founded in the 15th century, was a Nyingma or Sakya monastery. It also became a Gelug monastery in the 17th century.

Gonga Choding, a Nyingma monastery, was founded in 1500, and converted to Gelug in 1650.

A Gelug hermitage, Ngulchu Chodzong, was known for its printery.

The county was home to the 16th century main estate of the Thon Pa family.

== Administration divisions ==
Xaitongmoin County is divided into 1 town and 18 townships.

Name	Chinese	Hanyu Pinyin	Tibetan	Wylie
Town
Chabkha Town (Thongmon)	卡嘎镇	Kǎgā zhèn	ཆབ་ཁ་གྲོང་རྡལ།	chab kha grong rdal
Townships
Dagmoxar Township	达木夏乡	Dámùxià xiāng	སྟག་མོ་ཤར་ཤང་།	stag mo shar shang
Capu Township	查布乡	Chábù xiāng	ཚ་ཕུ་ཤང་།	tsha phu shang
Chuzhig Township	春哲乡	Chūnzhé xiāng	ཕྲུ་སྒྲིག་ཤང་།	phru sgrig shang
Zêxong Township	则许乡	Zéxǔ xiāng	རྩེ་གཤོངས་ཤང་།	rtse gshongs shang
Nyangra Township	娘热乡	Niángrè xiāng	ཉང་ར་ཤང་།	nyang ra shang
Tsozhi Township	措布西乡	Cuòbùxī xiāng	ཚོ་བཞི་ཤང་།	tsho bzhi shang
Nartang Township	纳当乡	Nàdāng xiāng	སྣར་ཐང་ཤང་།	snar thang shang
Qingtü Township	青都乡	Qīngdū xiāng	བྱིན་མཐུ་ཤང་།	byin mthu shang
Qêqung Township	切琼乡	Qiēqióng xiāng	བྱེ་ཆུང་ཤང་།	bye chung shang
Mübaqêqên Township	美巴切勤乡	Měibāqiēqín xiāng	མུས་པ་བྱེས་ཆེན་ཤང་།	mus pa byes chen shang
Lêba Township	列巴乡	Lièbā xiāng	སླེ་པ་ཤང་།	sle pa shang
Tarding Township	塔定乡	Tǎdìng xiāng	དར་སྡིངས་ཤང་།	dar sdings shang
Rungma Township	荣玛乡	Róngmǎ xiāng	རུང་མ་ཤང་།	rung ma shang
Tongmoin Township	通门乡	Tōngmén xiāng	མཐོང་སྨོན་ཤང་།	mthong smon shang
Danagpu Township	达那普乡	Dánàpǔ xiāng	རྟ་ནག་ཕུ་ཤང་།	rta nag phu shang
Danagda Township	达那塔乡	Dánàtǎ xiāng	རྟ་ནག་མདའ་ཤང་།	rta nag mda' shang
Namoqê Township	南木切乡	Nánmùqiē xiāng	ན་མོ་ཆེ་ཤང་།	na mo che shang
Ringqênzê Township	仁钦则乡	Rénqīnzé xiāng	རིན་ཆེན་རྩེ་ཤང་།	rin chen rtse shang

=== Other settlement ===
- Dêlêg
- Rigyel Monastery, Bon monastery founded in 1360.
