= Baimai =

- Township

Chinese transcription(s)
  - Traditional: 八美
  - Simplified: 八美
  - Pinyin: Bāměi
- Location within Tibet Autonomous Region
- Coordinates: 30°18′N 96°1′E
- Country: People's Republic of China
- Region: Tibet
- Prefecture: Qamdo Prefecture
- County: Lhorong County
- Nearby settlements (distance): Qumdo; 21.6 mi (35 km) Nagjog; 14.9 mi (24 km); Lingza; 20.2 mi (33 km); Ngomdo; 23.4 mi (38 km); Medogdeng; 16 mi (26 km) Gyari; 29.9 mi (48 km)
- Elevation: 4,507 m (14,787 ft)

Population
  - Total: 590
  - Major Nationalities: Tibetan
  - Regional dialect: Tibetan language
- Time zone: +8

Baimai (Chinese: 八美; pinyin: Bāměi) is a township in Lhorong County, Qamdo Prefecture in the eastern Tibet Autonomous Region of the People's Republic of China. It lies at an altitude of 4,507 metres (14,787 ft) and is located some 48 kilometres (30 mi) west of the village of Gyari.

The population is around 590.

== Sight ==
Bamei Town is situated in southeast of Daofu County of Garze Qiang and Tibetan Autonomous Prefecture of Sichuan Province.

The town is noted for nearby grassland, towering snow mountains and the charming Tibetan houses.

== See also ==
- List of towns and villages in Tibet Autonomous Region
