= Congdü =

Township in Shigatse, Tibet, China

Coordinates: 28°8′N 85°58′E

Congdü (Chinese: 充堆; pinyin: Chōngduī) is a township in Nyalam County, the Tibet Autonomous Region of China. It lies at an altitude of 3,763 metres (12,349 feet). The village has a population of about 237.

== See also ==
- List of towns and villages in Tibet
