= Jênlung =

Village in Tibet, China

Coordinates: 28°30′N 88°01′E

Jenlung is a village in the Tibet Autonomous Region of China.

== See also ==
- List of towns and villages in Tibet
