= Sêrlung =

Coordinates: 31°12′N 90°46′E

Sêrlung is a village in the Tibet Autonomous Region of China.

== See also ==
- List of towns and villages in Tibet
