= Sa'gya County =

Sa'gya County 萨迦县 • ས་སྐྱ་རྫོང་།
- County
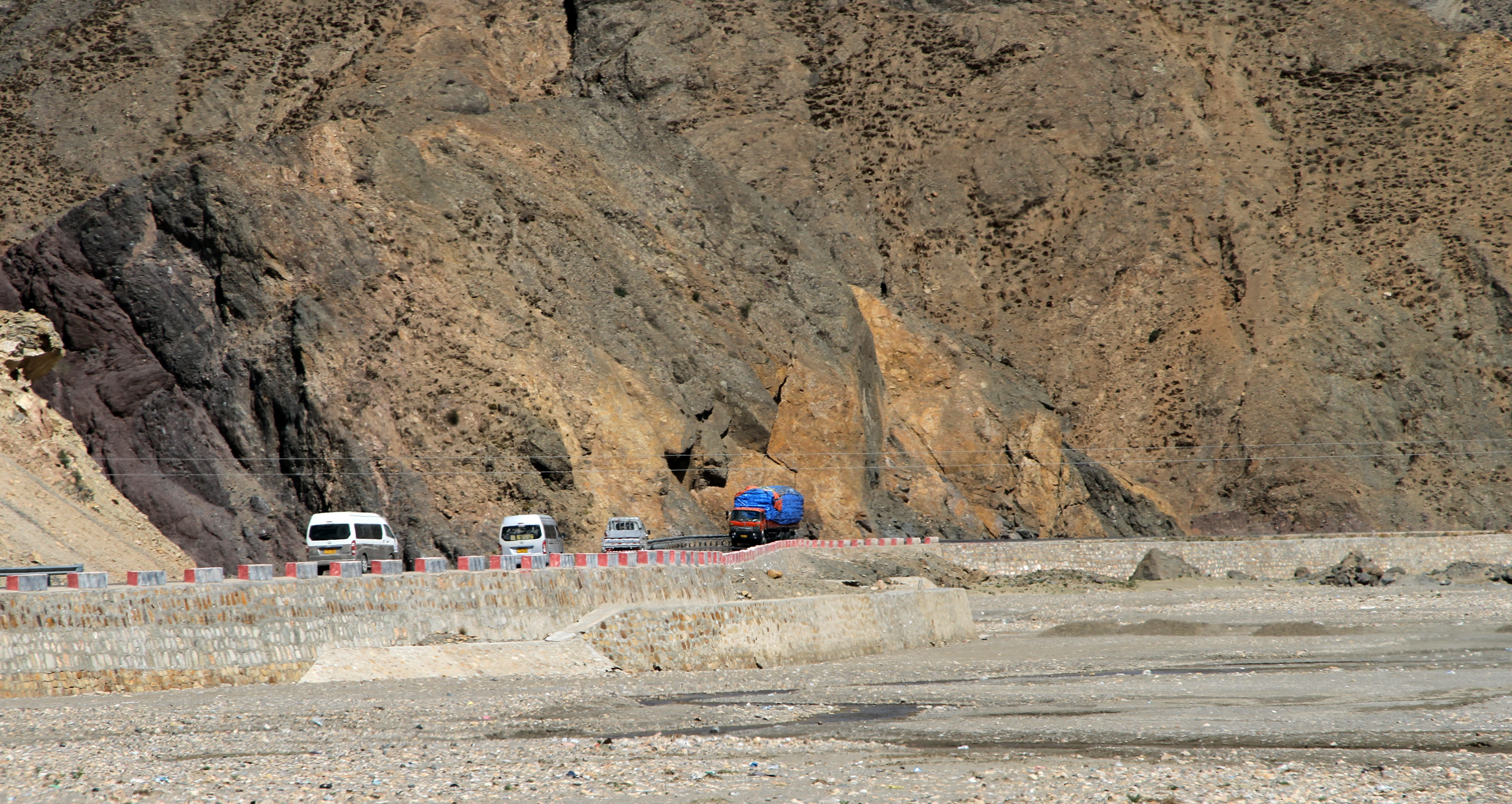
- Friendship Highway in Sa'gya County

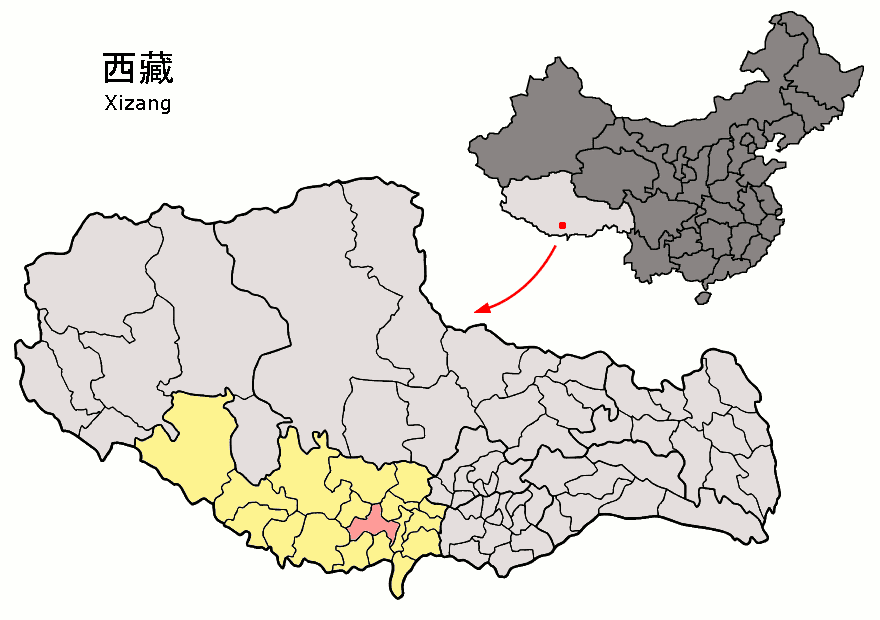
- Location of Sa'gya County (red) within Shigatse City (yellow) and the Tibet AR

- Location of the seat in the Tibet AR Sa'gya (China)
- Coordinates (Sa'gya County government): 28°53′59″N 88°01′18″E
- Country: China
- Autonomous region: Tibet
- Prefecture-level city: Shigatse
- County seat: Sa'gya (Sakya)

Area
  - Total: 5,748.81 km^{2} (2,219.63 sq mi)

Population (2020)
  - Total: 48,766
  - Density: 8.4828/km^{2} (21.970/sq mi)
- Time zone: UTC+8 (China Standard)
- Website: www.sj.gov.cn

Sa'gya County

Chinese name
- Simplified Chinese: 萨迦县
- Traditional Chinese: 薩迦縣
Transcriptions
Standard Mandarin
- Hanyu Pinyin: Sàjiā Xiàn

Tibetan name
- Tibetan: ས་སྐྱ་རྫོང་།
Transcriptions
- Wylie: sa skya rdzong
- Tibetan Pinyin: Sa'gya Zong

Sa'gya County (Tibetan: ས་སྐྱ་རྫོང་།; Chinese: 萨迦县) is a county under the prefecture-level city of Shigatse in the Tibet Autonomous Region, China.

The county is named after Sakya Monastery, home of the Sakya school of Tibetan Buddhism.

== Administration divisions ==
Sa'gya County is divided into 2 towns and 9 townships.

Name	Chinese	Hanyu Pinyin	Tibetan	Wylie
Towns
Sa'gya Town	萨迦镇	Sàjiā zhèn	ས་སྐྱ་གྲོང་རྡལ།	sa skya grong rdal
Gêding	吉定镇	Jídìng zhèn	དགེ་སྡིངས་གྲོང་རྡལ།	dge sdings grong rdal
Townships
Xungmai	雄麦乡	Xióngmài xiāng	གཞུང་སྨད་ཤང་།	gzhung smad shang
Maja Township	麻布加乡	Mábùjiā xiāng	རྨ་བྱ་ཤང་།	rma bya shang
Zhungma Township	雄玛乡	Xióngmǎ xiāng	གཞོང་མ་ཤང་།	gzhong ma shang
Tashigang	扎西岗乡	Zhāxīgǎng xiāng	བཀྲ་ཤིས་སྒང་ཤང་།	bkra shis sgang shang
Chagjug Township	扯休乡	Chěxiū xiāng	བྲག་མཇུག་ཤང་།	brag mjug shang
Së Township	赛乡	Sài xiāng	སྲད་ཤང་།	srad shang
Lalho Township	拉洛乡	Lāluò xiāng	ལ་ལྷོ་ཤང་།	la lho shang
Drag'rong Township	查荣乡	Cháróng xiāng	བྲག་རོང་ཤང་།	brag rong shang
Molha Township	木拉乡	Mùlā xiāng	མོ་ལྷ་ཤང་།	mo lha shang
