= Tibet: The Road Ahead =

1997 book by Dawa Norbu

- Author: Dawa Norbu
- Language: English
- Subject: History
- Genre: Nonfiction
- Published: 1997
- Publisher: HarperCollins Publishers India
- Publication place: India
- Media type: Hardcover
- Pages: 416
- ISBN: 978-0712670630
- OCLC: 1003996956

Tibet: The Road Ahead is a nonfiction book by Dawa Norbu, a Professor of Tibetan Studies at Jawaharlal Nehru University.

== Background ==
This is a revised and substantially expanded edition of Dawa Norbu's 1974 classic, Red Star Over Tibet. Rich in ethnographer-appealing detail, the book remains one of the best accounts of daily life in village Tibet on the eve of the Chinese invasion. It chronicles the experiences of the people of Sakya during the first years of Chinese occupation and indoctrification, until the author's family is forced into exile.

The additional chapters in this enlarged edition provide an analysis of developments in Tibet since 1980 and the author's interpretation of the current status (then 1997) of negotiations between the Dalai Lama and the Chinese government. The stalemate that has developed in Sino-Tibetan relations is highlighted by his discussion of the controversy surrounding the election of the new Panchen Lama. Since Beijing's claim to rule Tibet largely rests on the imperial tradition of conferring titles on high lamas, the dispute is really about sovereignty.

== Reception ==
Writing for The Tibet Journal, Ronald D. Schwart, a Professor of Sociology at Memorial University of Newfoundland writes, "Though the author, a political scientist who has written extensively on th subject of nationalism, offers no easy solutions to the Tibet question, he has a cautionary message not just for the Chinese, but for Tibetans as well: one of the major obstacles to ethnic conflict resolution is the rigid orthodoxy of state sovereignty that still resists creative flexibility."

In a review for Revue Bibliographique de Sinologie, French Tibetologist and Sinologist Anne Chayet writes, "Two-thirds of this work is a reissue of Red Star Over Tibet (London: Collins, 1974), a remarkable testimony to the culture and traditions of southern Tibet, as well as to the events of the 1980s. The author has added four chapters and an appendix of historical and geopolitical reflections, which justify the title change insofar as it suggests a different conclusion than the initial work."
