= Leba =

Leba may refer to:

- Łeba (German: Leba), a town in Pomerania, Poland
- Łeba River (German: Leba), a river in Pomerania, Poland, flowing into the Baltic Sea
- Lêba, a village in Tibet
- SS Leba, a German cargo ship in service 1940-45
- Leba Cave, an archaeological site in Angola
