= Sadeng =

Sadeng may refer to:

- Sadêng, a village in China
- Sadeng kingdom, a kingdom in Indonesia
