= Dobê Township =

Coordinates: 29°10′N 86°47′E

Dobê is a village and township in the Tibet Autonomous Region of China. It lies at an altitude of 4,234 metres (13,894 feet).

It lies approximately 16.9 miles south of Sangsang.

== See also ==
- List of towns and villages in Tibet
