= Rutoga =

Rutoga may refer to:

- Rutger, a character in Fire Emblem: The Binding Blade, known as Rutoga in Super Smash Bros. Brawl
- Rutog County, the Tibet Autonomous Region in Ngari Prefecture and the Tibetan pinyin called Rutoga Zong
