= Qux =

Qux may refer to:

- Yauyos–Chincha Quechua (ISO 639 language code: qux), a South American language
- Quadra FNX Mining (stock ticker: QUX), a Canadian mining company
- Qüxü County (geocode QUX), Tibet, China; see List of administrative divisions of the Tibet Autonomous Region
- Qux (computer science), a common metasyntactic variable or placeholder name
- QUX (radiotelegraphy), a Q-code encoding the phrase Do you have any navigational warnings or gale warnings in force?
- Unicode symbol U+A40D (qux), see Yi Syllables

== See also ==
- "qux", a word in the Chitimacha language
