= Bamda =

Bamda Township 帮达乡
- Township
- Location within the Tibet Autonomous Region
- Coordinates: 29°26′42″N 98°42′14″E
- Country: People's Republic of China
- Autonomous region: Tibet Autonomous Region
- Prefecture-level city: Nyingchi
- County: Markam
- Elevation: 3,805 m (12,484 ft)

Population
  - Total: 789
  - Major Nationalities: Tibetan
  - Regional dialect: Tibetan language
- Time zone: UTC+8 (CST)

Bamda (Tibetan: སྤངམདའ།, Wylie: spang mdav; simplified Chinese: 帮达乡; traditional Chinese: 幫達鄉; pinyin: Bāngdá Xiāng) is a small township in Markam County in the south-east of the Tibet Autonomous Region of China, roughly 1,000 kilometres (600 mi) from Lhasa. It is basically an army garrison with a small Tibetan village around the corner.

== See also ==
- List of towns and villages in Tibet Autonomous Region
