= Sêrtang =

Village in the Tibet Autonomous Region of China

Sêrtang is a village in the Tibet Autonomous Region of China.

== See also ==
- List of towns and villages in Tibet
