= Dênggar Township =

Coordinates: 29°11′N 85°47′E

Dênggar or Danga is a village and township in the Tibet Autonomous Region of China. It lies at an altitude of 4,532 metres (14,872 feet).

== See also ==
- List of towns and villages in Tibet
