= Kangxung Township =

Coordinates: 29°18′N 90°02′E

Kangxung is a village and township in the Tibet Autonomous Region of China.

== See also ==
- List of towns and villages in Tibet
