= Kata, Tibet =

Coordinates: 31.9127°N 94.9498°E

Kata, also called Gata, (Chinese: 嘎塔乡; pinyin: gátǎ xiāng), is a village in the Tibet Autonomous Region of China.

== See also ==
- List of towns and villages in Tibet
