= Paingar =

Coordinates: 31°12′N 94°02′E

Paingar (Chinese: 白嘎; pinyin: Báigā) is a township in Biru County, the Tibet Autonomous Region of China.

== See also ==
- List of towns and villages in Tibet
