= Cêngdo =

Coordinates: 29°11′N 98°40′E

Cêngdo (Chinese: 仓都; pinyin: Cāngdū) is a township in Markam County, Chamdo Prefecture, Tibet Autonomous Region of China.

It lies at an altitude of 4,042 metres (13,264 feet).

== See also ==
- List of towns and villages in Tibet
