= Dêlêg =

Dêlêg བདེ་ལེགས
- Town

Tibetan transcription(s)
  - Tibetan: བདེ་ལེགས
  - Wylie transliteration: bde legs
  - pronunciation in IPA: [telek]
  - official transcription (PRC): Dêlêg
  - THDL: Delek
  - other transcriptions: Deleg

Chinese transcription(s)
  - Traditional: 德來
  - Simplified: 德来
  - Pinyin: Délái
- Location within Tibet Autonomous Region
- Coordinates: 29°58′N 87°40′E
- Country: China
- Region: Tibet Autonomous Region
- Prefecture: Shigatse Prefecture
- County: Xaitongmoin

Population (2007)
  - Total: ~350

Dêlêg (Tibetan: བདེ་ལེགས་) is a village in Xaitongmoin county (Tibetan: བཞད་མཐོང་སྨོན་རྫོང་) of Shigatse Prefecture in the Tibet Autonomous Region of China, northeast of the county seat. The Tibetan name means "good luck". It lies at an elevation of 4,804 metres (15,764 feet). In 2007 the village had a population of about 350.

The main source of income in the area is herding yaks and sheep, major crops are Tibetan barley (qingko), buckwheat, peas and rapeseed.

== See also ==
- List of towns and villages in Tibet
