= Kamru Township =

Village and township in Tibet, China

Coordinates: 28°38′N 89°28′E

Kamru is a village and township in the Tibet Autonomous Region of China.

== See also ==
- List of towns and villages in Tibet
