= Baga, Mainling County =

Baga བྷ་ག 巴嘎村
- Village
- Location within Tibet Autonomous Region
- Coordinates: 29°59′47″N 94°42′08″E
- Country: People's Republic of China
- Autonomous region: Tibet Autonomous Region
- Prefecture-level city: Nyingchi
- County: Mainling

Population
  - Major Nationalities: Tibetan
  - Regional dialect: Tibetan language
- Time zone: UTC+8 (CST)

Baga (Tibetan: བྷ་ག, ZWPY: Baga; Chinese: 巴嘎; pinyin: Bāgā) is a village in Mainling County, in the south-east of the Tibet Autonomous Region of China and is located some 13.8 kilometres (8.6 mi) east of Tungdor, 25.6 kilometres (15.9 mi) south of Dagzê and 35.4 kilometres (22.0 mi) south of Qomo. There are said to be springs in the area, fed by the Kyichu River which flows nearby. The village produces a cheese known as thu.

It is under the administration of Qiangna Township (羌纳乡) of Mainling County.
