= Nyingzhong Township =

Nyingzhong Township 宁中乡
- Township
- Location in Tibet
- Coordinates: 30°22′32″N 90°54′49″E
- Country: China
- Region: Tibet
- Prefecture-level city: Lhasa
- County: Damxung
- Village-level divisions: 4 villages
- Elevation: 4,228 m (13,871 ft)
- Time zone: UTC+8 (China Standard)
- Postal code: 851500
- Area code: 0891

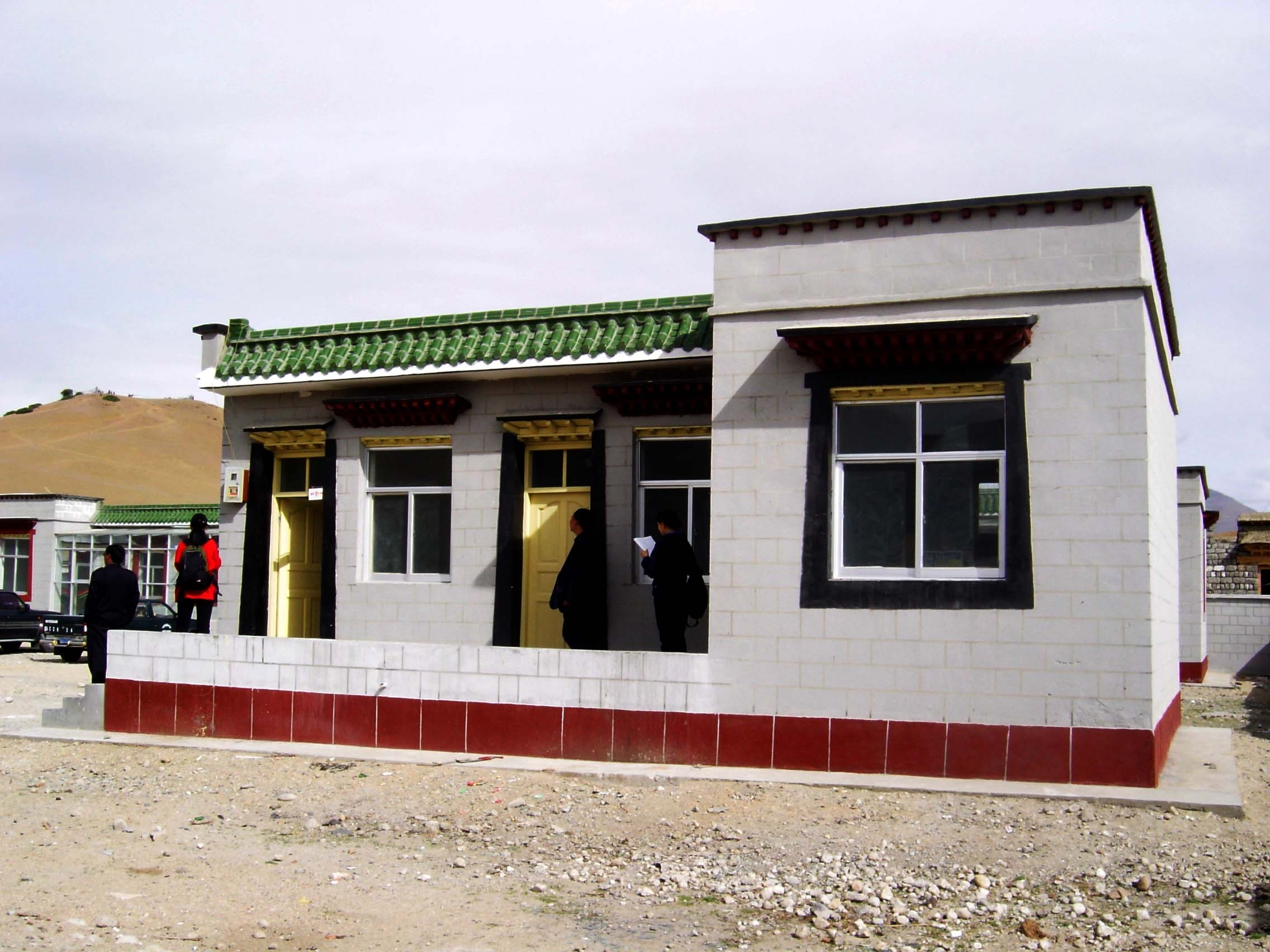
Nizhong Township Clinic, 2003.

Nyingzhong Township, or Ningzhong Township (simplified Chinese: 宁中乡; traditional Chinese: 寧中鄉; pinyin: Níngzhōng Xiāng; Standard Tibetan: ???) is a township of Damxung County, Tibet Autonomous Region, China located 21 kilometres (13 mi) southwest of the county seat and 82 km (51 mi) north-northwest of Lhasa. Road access to both the aforementioned places is provided by China National Highway 109. As of 2011, it has 4 villages under its administration.

== See also ==
- List of towns and villages in Tibet
