= Bilung =

Human settlement in China

Coordinates: 31°52′N 93°5′E

Bilung (Chinese: 布隆; pinyin: Bùlóng) is a township in Biru County, Tibet Autonomous Region of China.

== See also ==
- List of towns and villages in Tibet Autonomous Region
