= Sapügang Township =

Coordinates: 28°42′N 89°36′E

Sapügang is a village and township in the Tibet Autonomous Region of China.

== See also ==
- List of towns and villages in Tibet
