= Nyalam County =

Nyalam County གཉའ་ལམ་རྫོང་། · 聂拉木县
- County
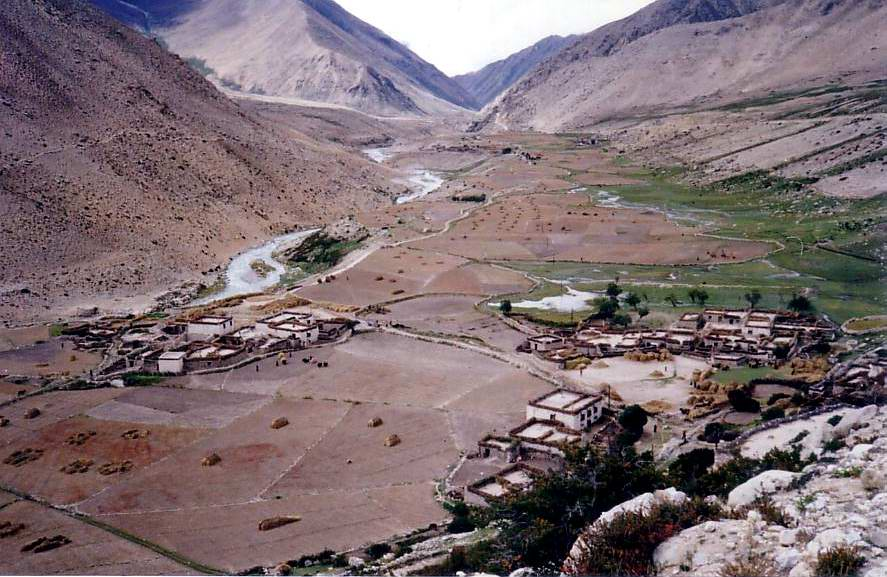
- Milarepa's Cave

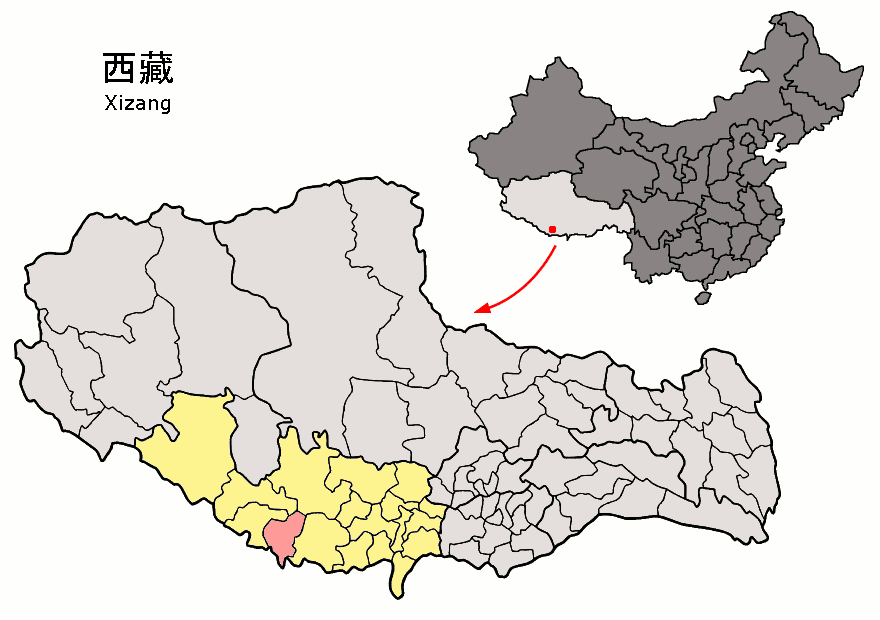
- Location of Nyalam County within Tibet Autonomous Region

- Location of the county seat in Tibet Nyalam (China)
- Coordinates (Nyalam County government): 28°09′19″N 85°58′56″E
- Country: China
- Autonomous region: Tibet
- Prefecture-level city: Shigatse
- County seat: Nyalam

Area
  - Total: 7,863.92 km^{2} (3,036.28 sq mi)

Population (2020)
  - Total: 17,009
  - Density: 2.1629/km^{2} (5.6019/sq mi)
- Time zone: UTC+8 (China Standard)
- Website: www.nlmx.gov.cn

Nyalam County

Chinese name
- Simplified Chinese: 聂拉木县
- Traditional Chinese: 聶拉木縣
Transcriptions
Standard Mandarin
- Hanyu Pinyin: Nièlāmù Xiàn

Tibetan name
- Tibetan: གཉའ་ལམ་རྫོང་།
Transcriptions
- Wylie: gnya' lam rdzong
- Tibetan Pinyin: Nyalam Zong

Nyalam County (Chinese: 聂拉木县; Tibetan: གཉའ་ལམ་རྫོང་།) is a county in Shigatse, Tibet, China. It borders on Nepal.

The land area of the county is 7,903 km^{2} (3,051 sq mi). The population as of 2003 was 10,000. The postal code for the county is 858300.

The county seat is in Nyalam Town.

The other town of the county is Zhangmu, also known by its Tibetan name Dram, or Nepali Khasa. It is located near the border and is the point of entry from Nepal. At "merely" 2,300 meters elevation about the sea level, Zhangmu has mild and humid subtropical climate, which is a rarity for Tibet.

It is one of the four counties that comprise the Qomolangma National Nature Preserve (Nyalam, Tingri, Dinggyê, and Kyirong).

== Administration divisions ==
Nyalam County is divided into 2 towns and 5 townships.

Name	Chinese	Hanyu Pinyin	Tibetan	Wylie
Towns
Nyalam Town	聂拉木镇	Nièlāmù zhèn	གནའ་ལམ་གྲོང་རྡལ།	gnya' lam grong rdal
Dram Town	樟木镇	Zhāngmù zhèn	འགྲམ་གྲོང་རྡལ།	'gram grong rdal
Townships
Yarlêb Township	亚来乡	Yàlái xiāng	ཡར་སླེབས་ཤང་།	yar slebs shang
Zurco Township	琐作乡	Suǒzuò xiāng	ཟུར་མཚོ་ཤང་།	zur mtsho shang
Nailung Township	乃龙乡	Nǎilóng xiāng	ནས་ལུང་ཤང་།	nas lung shang
Mainpu Township	门布乡	Ménbù xiāng	སྨན་ཕུ་ཤང་།	sman phu shang
Borong Township	波绒乡	Bōróng xiāng	སྤོ་རོང་ཤང་།	spo rong shang

== Climate ==
Climate data for Nyalam, elevation 3,810 m (12,500 ft), (1991–2020 normals, extremes 1981–present)
Month	Jan	Feb	Mar	Apr	May	Jun	Jul	Aug	Sep	Oct	Nov	Dec	Year
Record high °C (°F)	16.3 (61.3)	17.7 (63.9)	19.1 (66.4)	18.0 (64.4)	20.6 (69.1)	21.6 (70.9)	23.1 (73.6)	21.7 (71.1)	19.2 (66.6)	18.4 (65.1)	16.1 (61.0)	15.9 (60.6)	23.1 (73.6)
Mean daily maximum °C (°F)	3.0 (37.4)	3.7 (38.7)	6.2 (43.2)	9.5 (49.1)	12.0 (53.6)	14.4 (57.9)	15.2 (59.4)	15.3 (59.5)	13.8 (56.8)	10.5 (50.9)	8.1 (46.6)	5.9 (42.6)	9.8 (49.6)
Daily mean °C (°F)	−3.2 (26.2)	−2.4 (27.7)	0.2 (32.4)	3.2 (37.8)	6.3 (43.3)	9.7 (49.5)	10.9 (51.6)	10.7 (51.3)	9.0 (48.2)	4.3 (39.7)	0.9 (33.6)	−1.1 (30.0)	4.0 (39.3)
Mean daily minimum °C (°F)	−8.0 (17.6)	−7.0 (19.4)	−4.2 (24.4)	−1.0 (30.2)	2.4 (36.3)	6.5 (43.7)	8.4 (47.1)	8.1 (46.6)	5.9 (42.6)	−0.2 (31.6)	−4.1 (24.6)	−6.1 (21.0)	0.1 (32.1)
Record low °C (°F)	−19.1 (−2.4)	−17.8 (0.0)	−14.3 (6.3)	−12.0 (10.4)	−5.3 (22.5)	−1.3 (29.7)	3.9 (39.0)	3.0 (37.4)	−2.2 (28.0)	−8.6 (16.5)	−11.6 (11.1)	−18.2 (−0.8)	−19.1 (−2.4)
Average precipitation mm (inches)	48.3 (1.90)	64.9 (2.56)	65.6 (2.58)	49.1 (1.93)	39.1 (1.54)	54.2 (2.13)	80.9 (3.19)	74.4 (2.93)	72.9 (2.87)	38.2 (1.50)	10.6 (0.42)	14.9 (0.59)	613.1 (24.14)
Average precipitation days (≥ 0.1 mm)	7.4	10.5	14.6	15.3	14.8	16.5	24.8	24.5	17.4	6.2	2.9	2.3	157.2
Average snowy days	8.4	12.5	17.3	13.0	3.2	0.1	0	0	0.1	3.0	4.0	3.1	64.7
Average relative humidity (%)	47	54	62	68	73	79	83	83	81	69	52	40	66
Mean monthly sunshine hours	194.3	177.3	206.0	220.8	264.8	241.6	192.9	185.9	190.5	221.6	212.0	206.1	2,513.8
Percentage possible sunshine	59	56	55	57	63	58	46	46	52	63	66	64	57
Source: China Meteorological Administrationall-time Mar record high

== Transport ==
- China National Highway 318

== Gallery ==
Nyalam County

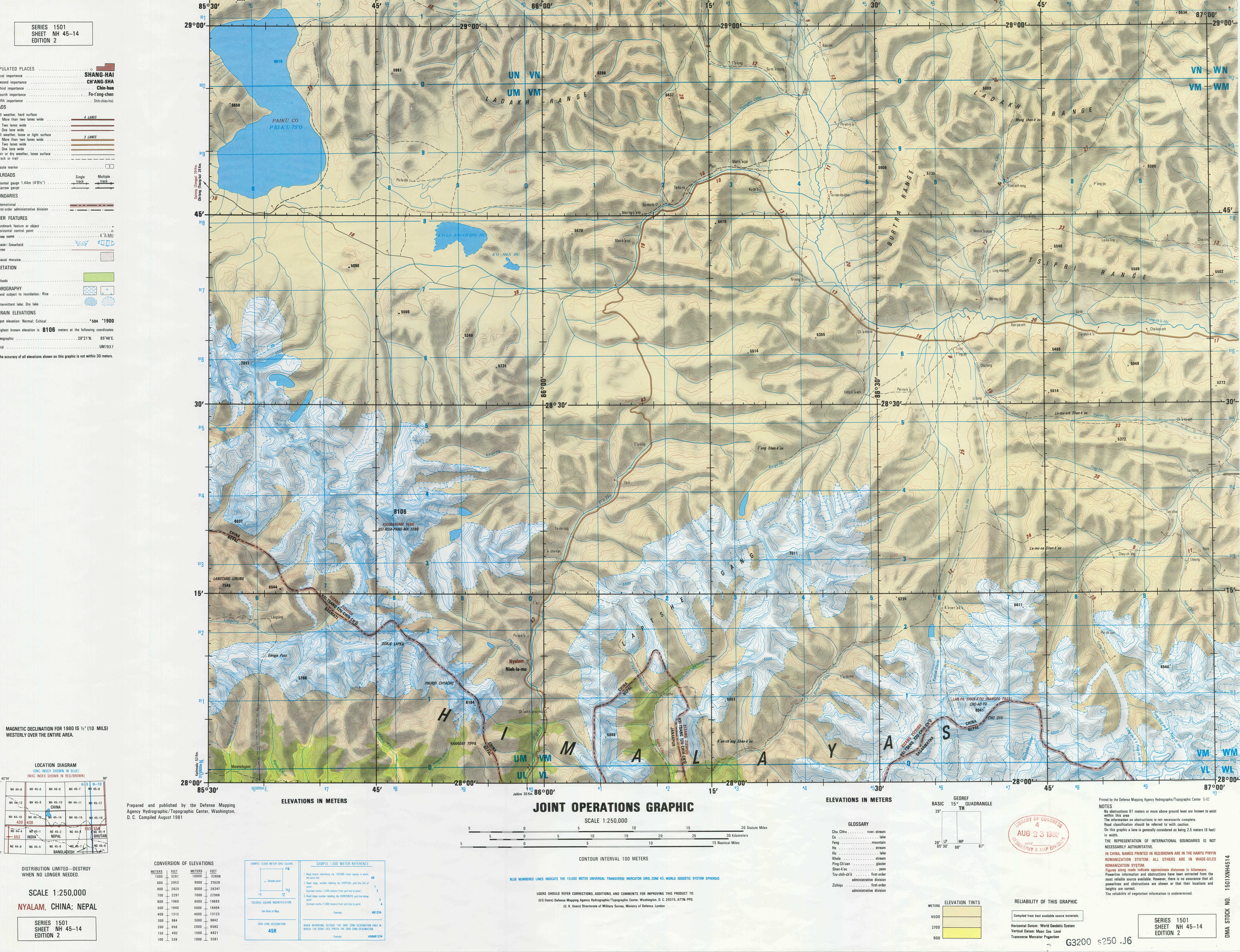
Map including Nyalam County area (DMA, 1981)

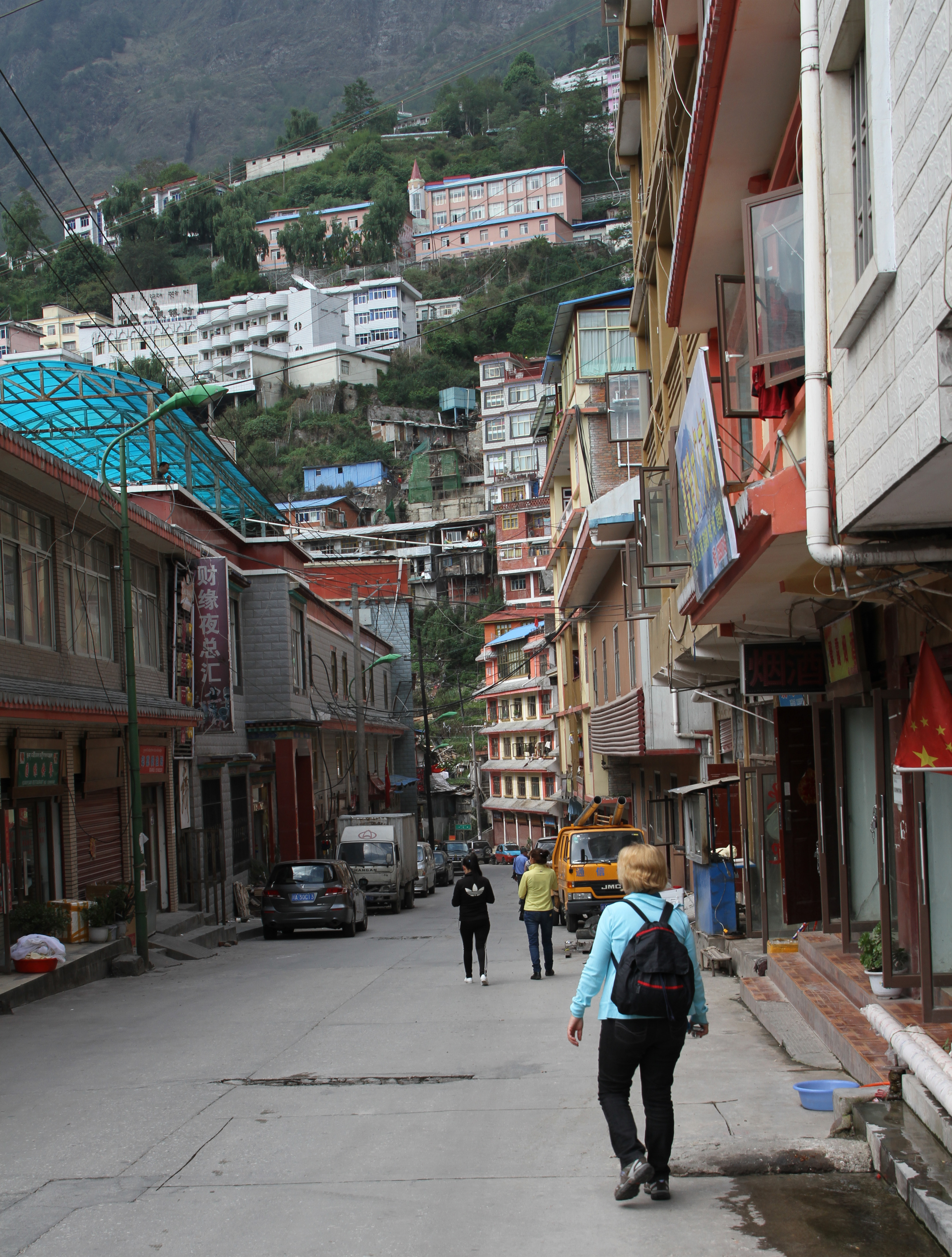
Zhangmu

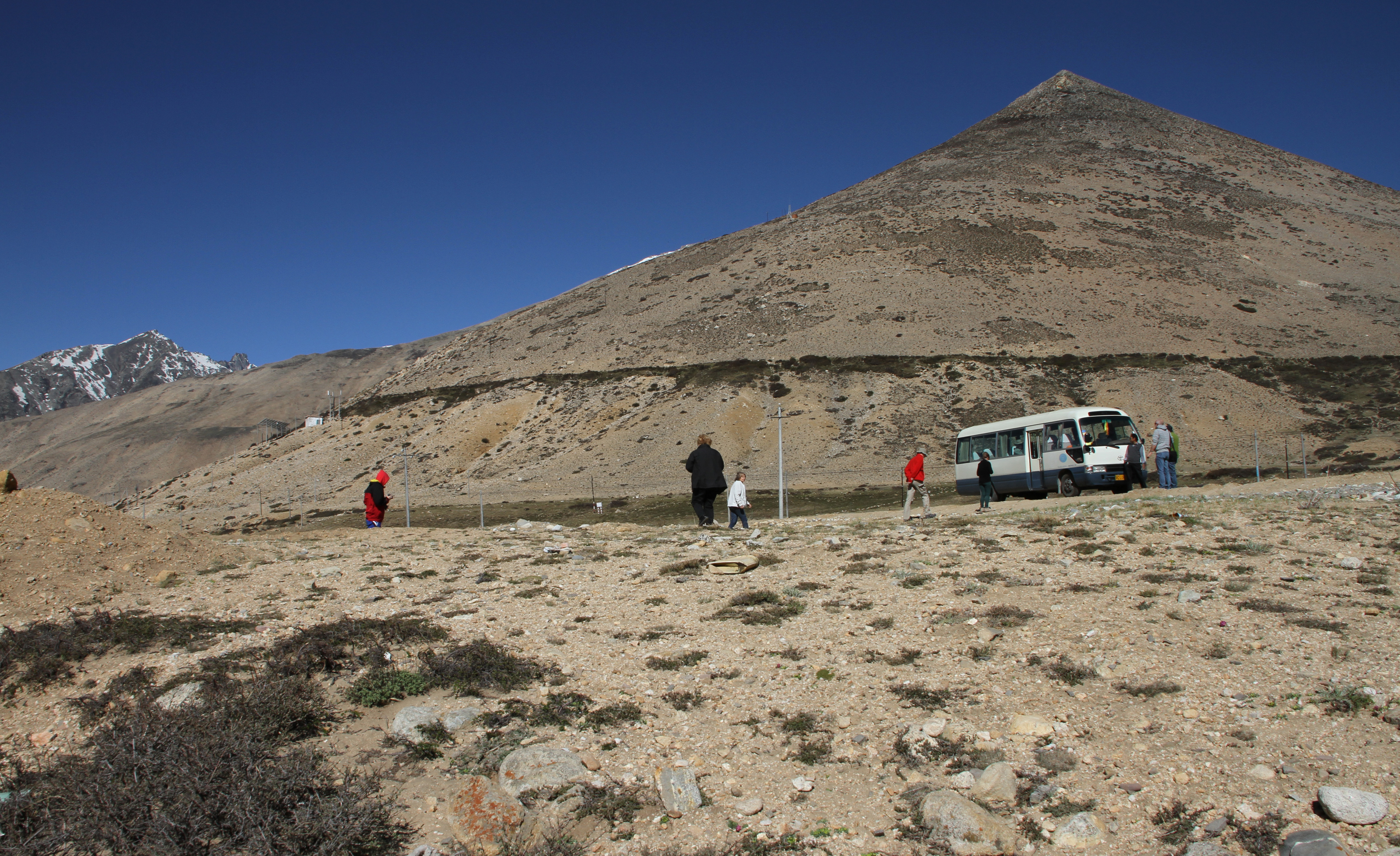
Zhangmu to Lalung La

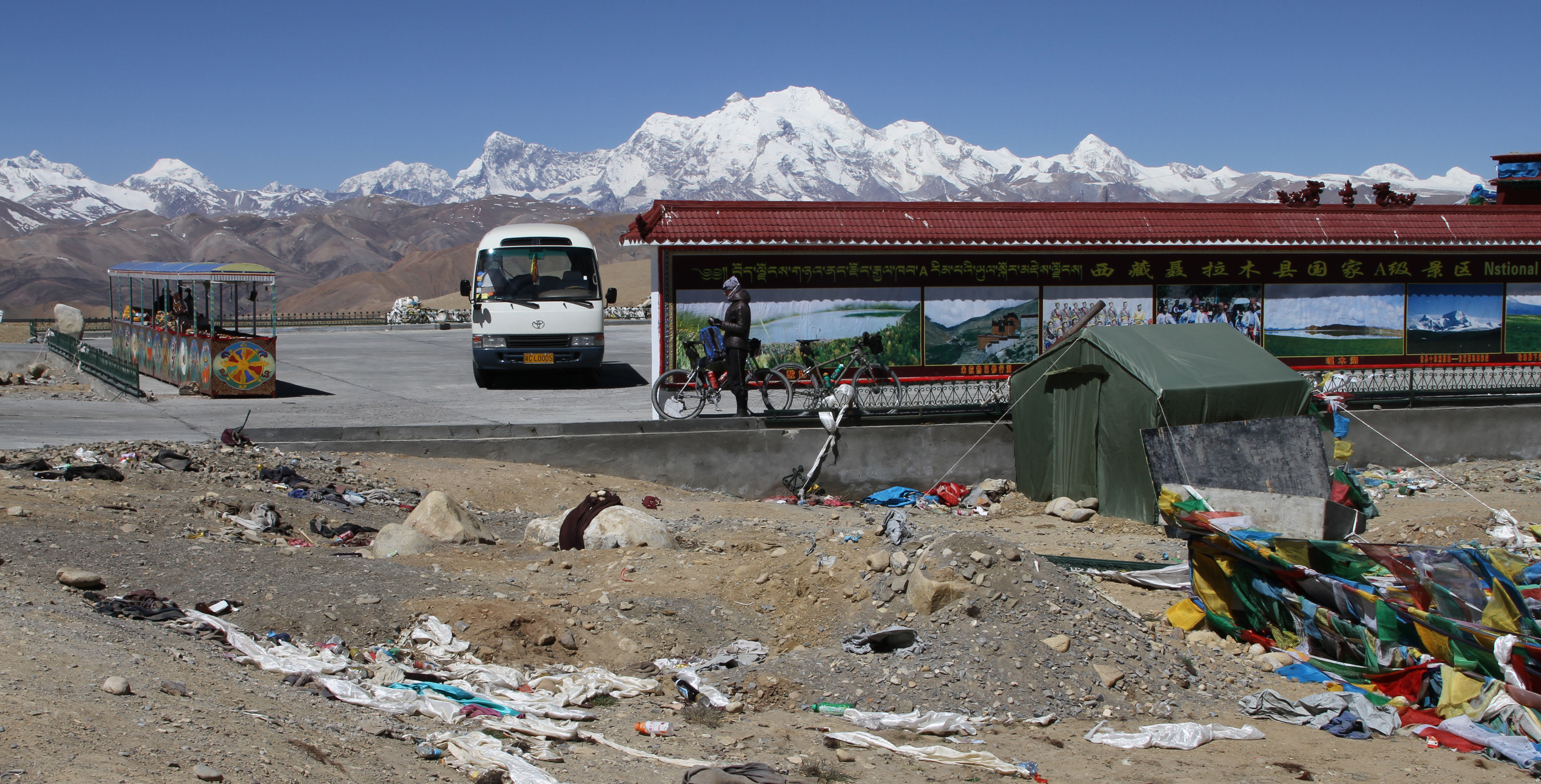
Lalung La

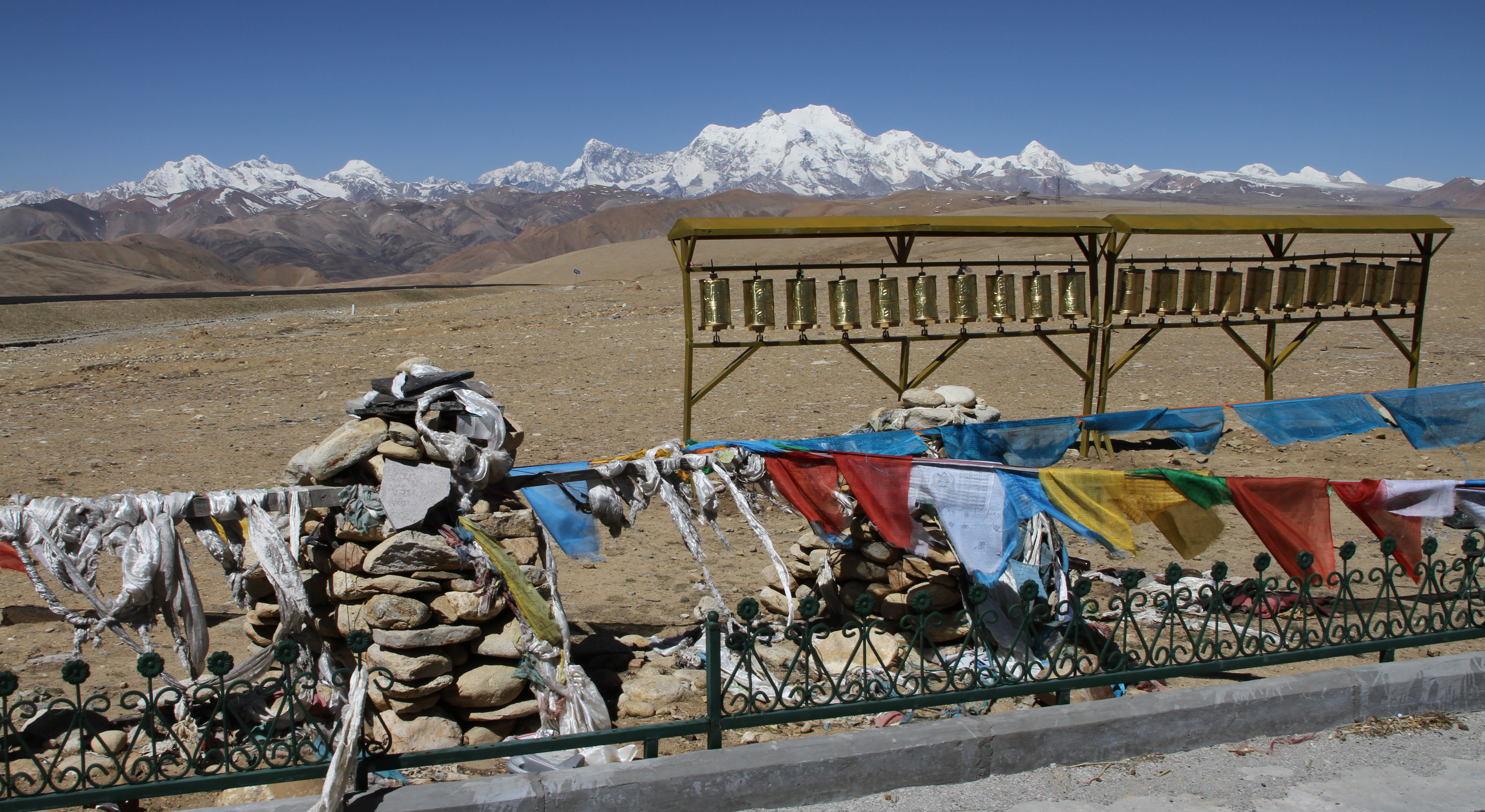
Lalung La

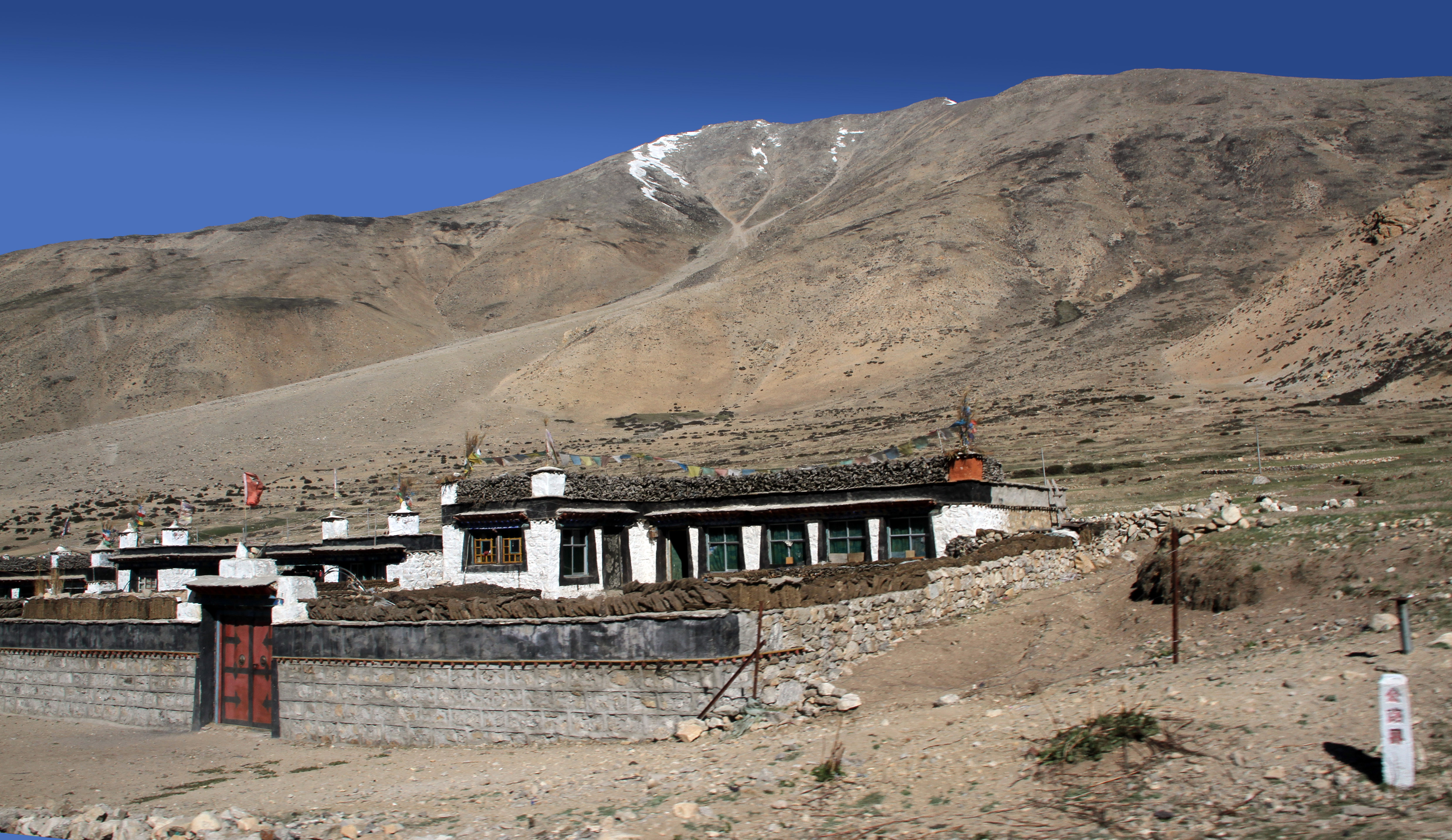

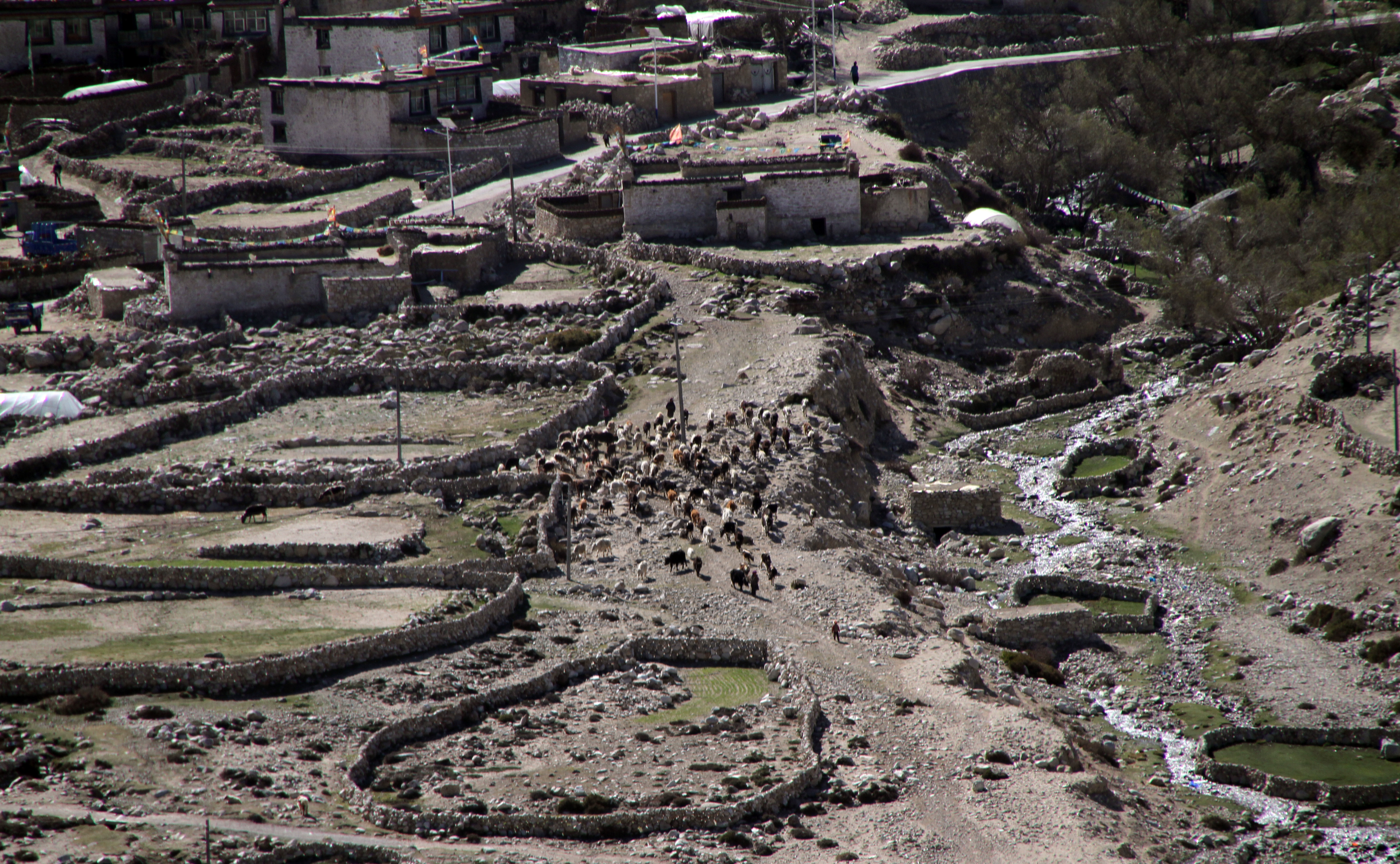
