= Rongma =

Coordinates: 32°59′N 86°35′E

Rongma is a village in Nagqu. Its economy is dependent on wool production and coal mining.

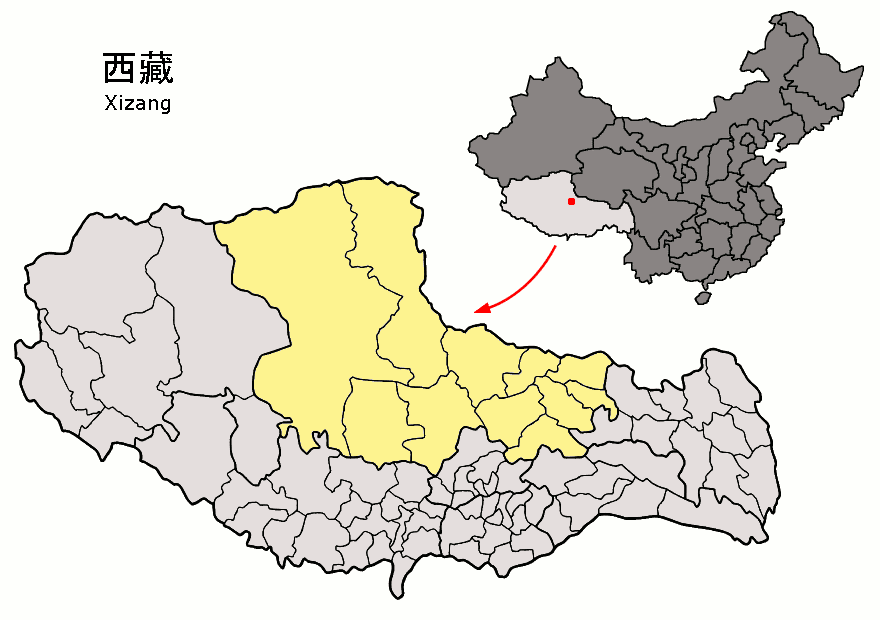
Map of Nagqu

== See also ==
- List of towns and villages in Tibet
