= Samarda Township =

Coordinates: 28°24′N 89°30′E

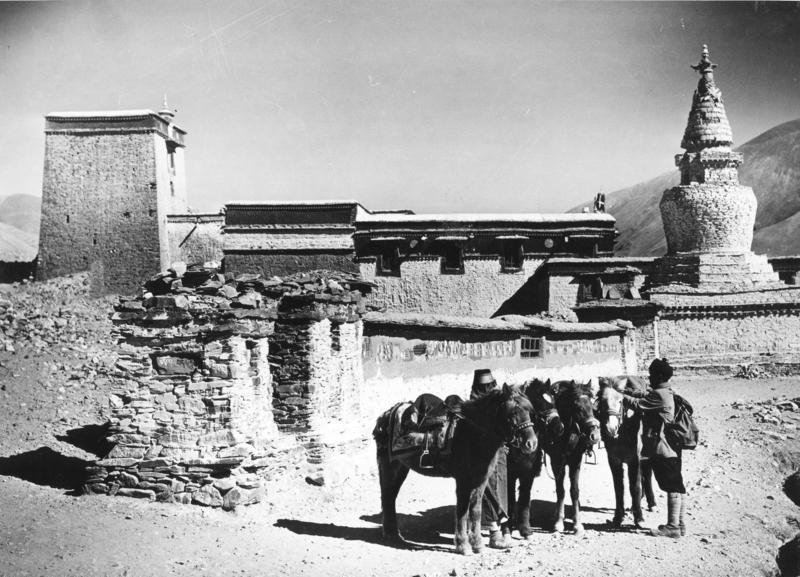
Monastery in Samada, 1938

Samada is a township in the Tibet Autonomous Region of China.

== See also ==
- List of towns and villages in Tibet
