= Rintor Township =

Coordinates: 31°27′N 83°25′E

Ringtor is a village and township in the Tibet Autonomous Region of China.

== See also ==
- List of towns and villages in Tibet
