= Gêla Township =

Coordinates: 30°12′N 83°32′E

Gêla is a village and township in the Tibet Autonomous Region of China.

== See also ==
- List of towns and villages in Tibet
