= Nangxian =

Village in Tibet, China

Coordinates: 29°03′N 93°12′E

Nangxian is a village in the Tibet Autonomous Region of China, bordering Nepal, India and Bhutan.

== See also ==
- List of towns and villages in Tibet
