= Naiyü =

Ethnic township in Tibet, China

Coordinates: 29°10′N 94°12′E

Naiyü is an ethnic township of the Lhoba people in the Tibet Autonomous Region of China.

== See also ==
- List of towns and villages in Tibet
