= Zala, Tibet =

Zala
- Location within Tibet
- Coordinates: 31°45′N 93°35′E
- Country: China
- Region: Tibet

Population
  - Total
  - Major Nationalities: Tibetan
  - Regional dialect: Tibetan language
- Time zone: +8

Zala, also Zhala or Zhalaxiang, is a village in the Tibet Autonomous Region of China.

== See also ==
- List of towns and villages in Tibet
