= Parco, Tibet =

Coordinates: 32°20′N 82°10′E

Parco (Chinese: 巴措; pinyin: Bācuò) is a town in Dêngqên County, Tibet Autonomous Region of China.

== See also ==
- List of towns and villages in Tibet
