= Cuozheqiangma =

Township in Tibet, China

Coordinates: 33.30°N 87.755°E

Cuozheqiangmaxiang (Chinese: 措折强玛乡) is a township in the Tibet Autonomous Region of China.

== See also ==
- List of towns and villages in Tibet
