= Kunglung Township =

Village in Tibet, China

Coordinates: 30°30′N 86°01′E

Kunglung is a village and township in the Tibet Autonomous Region of China.

== See also ==
- List of towns and villages in Tibet
