= Targyailing Township =

Chinese village

Coordinates: 29°29′N 85°05′E

Targyailing is a village and township in the Tibet Autonomous Region of China.

== See also ==
- List of towns and villages in Tibet
