= Bünsum =

Coordinates: 30°13′N 83°0′E

Bünsum, Gyaimain (Tibetan: སྤུན་གསུམ, ZYPY: Bünsum; Chinese: 加麻乡白松村; pinyin: Jiāmá xiāng Báisōng cūn) is a village in Qonggyai County, Tibet Autonomous Region of China. It lies at an altitude of 4,755 metres (15,603 feet).

Administrative division codes: 542225 202 203

It was formerly a village of Bünsum township of Qonggyai (not Bünsum township of Dêrong), but the Bünsum township of Qonggyai was eventually defunct.

== See also ==
- List of towns and villages in Tibet Autonomous Region
