= Rusar Township =

Village and township in Tibet, China

Coordinates: 30°02′N 86°00′E

Rusar is a village and township in the Tibet Autonomous Region of China.

== See also ==
- List of towns and villages in Tibet
