= Mainpu Township =

Coordinates: 28°47′N 86°14′E

Mainpu is a village and township in the Tibet Autonomous Region of China.

== See also ==
- List of towns and villages in Tibet
