= Qingdü Township =

Coordinates: 30°02′N 88°23′E

Qingtü is a village and township in the Tibet Autonomous Region of China.

== See also ==
- List of towns and villages in Tibet
