= Bamei =

Bamei is a village located in the northern part of Guangnan County, Wenshan Zhuang and Miao Autonomous Prefecture, Yunnan province, China. The name Bamei is from the language of Zhuang nationality, which means “cave in the forest” . It is said that the ancestors of the villagers escaped to this isolated place because of war. The village is surrounded by mountains so the traffic is inconvenient. There are two natural limestone karst tunnel out of the village, the villagers have to go inside or outside through a few kilometers by boat. Due to its remoteness position so it is difficult to contact with the outside world,. Bamei is isolated with the outside world, which is known as” the land of idyllic beauty”. Because of its isolation, the villagers still used ancient farming tools just as wooden plow harrow and homemade water tankers. They produce clothes from own cotton, make fire to cook, live a self-sufficiency life. The population of Bamei is very small. In the 1950s, there were only more than 30 households. Over the past few decades, now the village population is only 600 people, but every year the village attracts 200 thousand visitors come to travel. Not only for the village all around the unique Karst landforms but also because the village maintained their original way of life.
