= Xongmai Township =

Xungmai

Tibetan transcription(s)
  - Tibetan: གཞོང་སྨད་ཤང་།

Chinese transcription(s)
  - Simplified: 雄美乡
- Location within Tibet
- Coordinates: 28.5854°N 87.8624°E
- Country: China
- Region: Tibet

Population
  - Total
  - Major Nationalities: Tibetan
  - Regional dialect: Tibetan language
- Time zone: +8

Xungmai is a village and township in the Tibet Autonomous Region of China.

== See also ==
- List of towns and villages in Tibet
