= Lungmar Township =

Coordinates: 28°52′N 89°55′E

Lungmar is a village and township in the Tibet Autonomous Region of China.

== See also ==
- List of towns and villages in Tibet
