= Karmai Township =

Coordinates: 29°08′N 89°28′E

Karmai
- Village
- Interactive map of Karmai
- Country: China
- Region: Tibet

Karmai is a village and township in the Tibet Autonomous Region of China.

== See also ==
- List of towns and villages in Tibet
