= Kardoi Township =

Coordinates: 29°07′N 89°32′E

Kardoi is a village and township in the Tibet Autonomous Region of China.

== See also ==
- List of towns and villages in Tibet
