= Namoqê Township =

Village in Tibet, China

Coordinates: 29°44′N 88°23′E

Namoqê is a village and township in the Tibet Autonomous Region of China.

== See also ==
- List of towns and villages in Tibet
