= Gyinkar Township =

Coordinates: 28°50′N 89°18′E

Gyinkar is a village and township in the Tibet Autonomous Region of China.

== See also ==
- List of towns and villages in Tibet
