= Sangsang =

Village in Tibet, China

Coordinates: 29°25′N 86°39′E

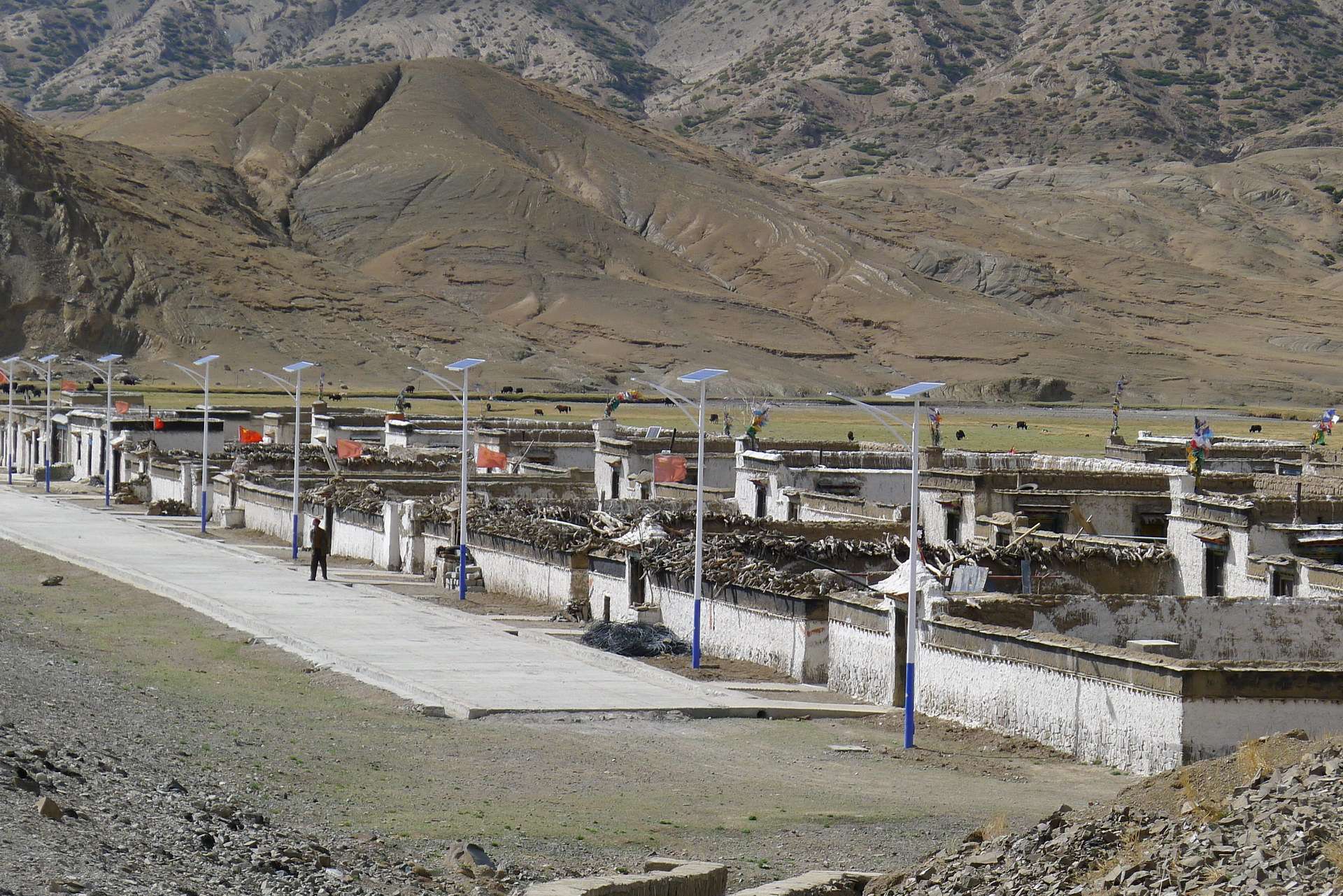
Jucang Village under Sangsang township

Sangsang is a village and township in the Tibet Autonomous Region of China.

== See also ==
- List of towns and villages in Tibet
