= Comai County =

Comai County 措美县 • མཚོ་སྨད་རྫོང་།
- County
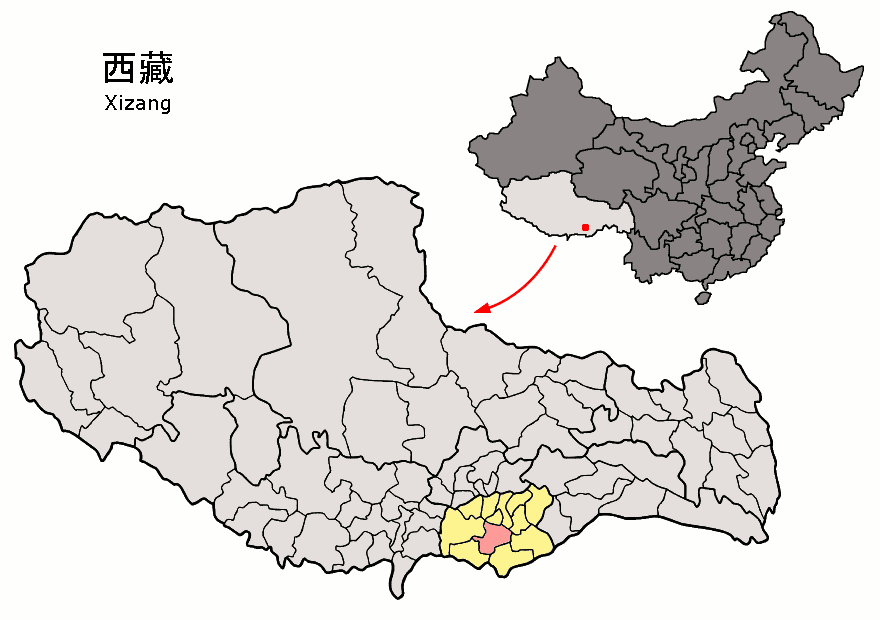
- Location of Comai County (red) in Shannan City (yellow) and the Tibet A.R.

- Location of the seat in Tibet Comai (China)
- Coordinates: 28°26′18″N 91°26′01″E
- Country: China
- Autonomous region: Tibet
- Prefecture-level city: Shannan (Lhoka)
- County seat: Comai

Area
  - Total: 4,177.21 km^{2} (1,612.83 sq mi)

Population (2020)
  - Total: 12,132
  - Density: 2.9043/km^{2} (7.5222/sq mi)
- Time zone: UTC+8 (China Standard)
- Website: www.cuomei.gov.cn

Comai County

Chinese name
- Simplified Chinese: 措美县
- Traditional Chinese: 措美縣
Transcriptions
Standard Mandarin
- Hanyu Pinyin: Cuòměi Xiàn

Tibetan name
- Tibetan: མཚོ་སྨད་རྫོང་།
Transcriptions
- Wylie: mtsho smad rdzong
- Tibetan Pinyin: Comai Zong

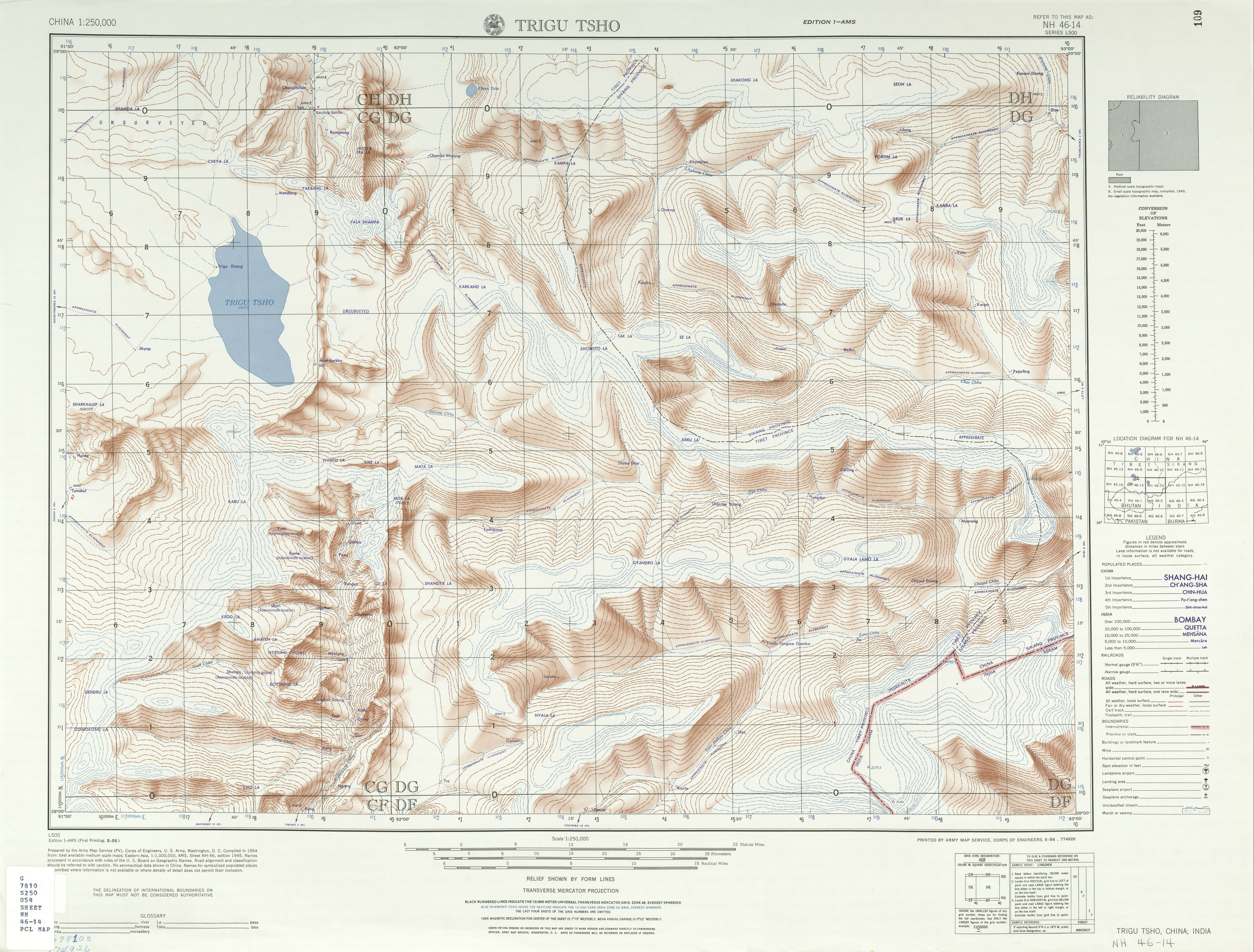
Trigu Tsho (1954)

Comai County (Tibetan: མཚོ་སྨད་རྫོང་།, Chinese: 措美县) is a county of Shannan located in the south-east of the Tibet Autonomous Region, China.

Comai County is famous for its Tibetan Mastiffs and known as the home of Tibetan Mastiff.

Tibetan Mastiff is 24-28 inches tall (at shoulder) and weighs 140-180 pounds. The dog is commonly found wearing a red yak's-hair collar.

== Administrative divisions ==
Comai County contains 2 towns and 2 townships.

Name	Chinese	Hanyu Pinyin	Tibetan	Wylie
Towns
Comai Town	措美镇	Cuòměi zhèn	མཚོ་སམད་གྲོང་རྡལ།	mtsho smad grong rdal
Drigu Town	哲古镇	Zhégǔ zhèn	གྲི་གུ་གྲོང་རྡལ།	gri gu grong rdal
Townships
Naixi Township	乃西乡	Nǎixī xiāng	གནས་བཞི་ཤང་།	gnas bzhi shang
Godü Township	古堆乡	Gǔduī xiāng	སྒོ་བསྡུས་ཤང་།	sgo bsdus shang
