= Nailung Township =

Village and township in the Tibet Autonomous Region of China

Nailung is a village and township in the Tibet Autonomous Region of China.

== See also ==
- List of towns and villages in Tibet
