= Lêba Township =

Coordinates: 29°52′N 87°24′E

Lêba is a village and township in the Tibet Autonomous Region of China.

== See also ==
- List of towns and villages in Tibet
