= List of populated places in the Tibet Autonomous Region =

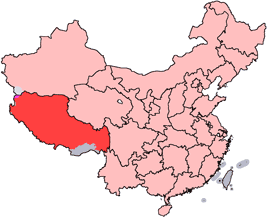
Tibet Autonomous Region, China

An alphabetical list of populated places, including cities, towns, and villages, in the Tibet Autonomous Region of western China.

== A ==
- Alamdo
- Alhar
- Arza
- Asog

== B ==
- Baga
- Bagar
- Baidi
- Baima
- Baimai
- Baixoi
- Bamda
- Banag
- Banbar
- Banggaidoi
- Bangkor
- Bangru
- Bangxing
- Baqên
- Bar
- Bêba
- Bei
- Bênqungdo
- Bilung
- Birba
- Biru
- Bogkamba
- Boindoi
- Bolo
- Bongba
- Boqê
- Bumgyê
- Bungona’og
- Bünsum
- Burang
- Bushêngcaka

== C ==
- Caina
- Cakaxiang
- Camco
- Cawarong
- Cazê
- Cêgnê
- Cêngdo
- Cêri
- Cêrwai
- Chabug
- Chacang
- Chagla
- Chagna
- Chagyoi
- Cha’gyüngoinba
- Chalükong
- Chamco
- Chamda
- Chamoling
- Changgo
- Changlung
- Changmar
- Charing
- Chatang
- Chawola
- Chêcang
- Chênggo
- Chepzi
- Chibma
- Chido
- Chigu
- Chongkü
- Chongsar
- Chowa
- Chubalung
- Chubarong
- Chuka
- Chumba
- Chumbu
- Chunduixiang
- Co Nyi
- Cocholung
- Codoi
- Cogo
- Coka
- Comai
- Cona (Tsona)
- Co’nga
- Congdü
- Conggo
- Coqên
- Coyang
- Cuoma
- Cuozheqiangma

== D ==
- Dagdong
- Dagmo
- Dagri
- Dagring
- Dagzhuka
- Dakyung
- Damdoi
- Damnyain
- Dangquka
- Damxoi
- Daba (Danbab)
- Dangqên
- Daqên
- Dartang
- Darzhuo
- Dawatang
- Dawaxung
- Dayêr
- Dêgên
- Dêgyi
- Dêlêg
- Dêmqog
- Dênggar
- Dêngzê
- Dêqên
- Dêrdoin
- Dêrtang
- Rutog
- Dêxing
- Digna
- Dingchog
- Dinggo
- Dinggyê
- Diyag
- Doba
- Dobê
- Dobjoi
- Dobqên
- Dobzha
- Do’gyaling
- Doijiang
- Dolma Sampa
- Domar
- Domartang
- Dombang
- Dongbo
- Dongco
- Donggar
- Dongjug
- Dongngoin
- Dongqiao
- Dongxê
- Doqemo
- Doxoggu
- Doxong
- Dungro
- Dunxu
- Duomula
- Düri
- Dzānak

== E ==
- Êmagang

== F ==
- Fosung

== G ==
- Gadong
- Gala
- Gambaxoi
- Gamqen
- Gamtog
- Gana
- Ganda
- Gandaingoin
- Gangga
- Gaqoi
- Garbiutangka
- Garbo
- Garo
- Gardê
- Gariqiong
- Garma
- Garong
- Gar Chongsar
- Garyarsa (Gartok)
- Gase
- Gatang
- Gêding
- Gêgar
- Gejizhen
- Gêla
- Gohaling
- Goibo
- Goicang
- Goicangdoi
- Goicangmai
- Goin’gyibug
- Goinsargoin
- Golag
- Golingka
- Golug
- Gomo
- Gongtang
- Gongqên
- Gormain
- Gorqu
- Gotang (Kungtang)
- Gowaqungo
- Goxung
- Goyü
- Güncang
- Günlu
- Günsa
- Günsang
- Gur
- Gurabnamgyai
- Gurum
- Gyaca
- Gyaco
- Gya'gya
- Gyamco
- Gyamda
- Gyamotang
- Gyamug
- Gyanbê
- Gyangkar
- Gyangngog
- Gyangrang
- Gyantse
- Gya'nyima
- Gyarab
- Gyari
- Gyarubtang
- Gyaxing
- Gyazhug
- Gyêmdong
- Gyêrba
- Gyêwa
- Gyibug
- Gyigang
- Gyigyi
- Gyimda
- Gyimda
- Gyinkar
- Gyipug
- Gyiru
- Gyitang
- Gyonub
- Gyorxung
- Gyungcang

== H ==
- Hongqi
- Hongxing
- Hormai
- Horru
- Huangtiandi
- Huo'er (Hor)

== I ==
- Isaikalog

== J ==
- Jagbung
- Jaggang
- Jagka
- Jagsamka
- Jainzhug
- Jangco
- Jangdam
- Jangmai
- Jêdêxoi
- Jênlung
- Jiangda (Jamda)
- Jiaqiong (Jongnag)
- Jiazha
- Jiggyob
- Jomda
- Jongnê
- Jorra
- Jungba
- Jungsi

== K ==
- Kada
- Kagor
- Kaika
- Kaimar
- Kamru
- Kamsa
- Kanglung
- Kangmar
- Kangrai
- Kangro
- Kangsê
- Kangtog
- Kangxung
- Kardag
- Kardoi
- Kargang
- Karmai
- Karmardo
- Karrêg
- Karsumdo
- Kata
- Kazixiang
- Kenze Māne
- Kormang
- Korqên
- Korqug
- Küba
- Kugka Lhai
- Kunggar
- Kunglung
- Kurqên
- Kyangngoin
- Kyêrdo
- Kyunglung

== L ==
- Ladoi
- Laiyor
- Laka
- Lamado
- Langgar
- Langju
- Langmai
- Langmar
- Langna
- Lanngazhoinkang
- Lazhuglung
- Lêba
- Lêgzê
- Leten
- Lhabu
- Lha’gyai
- Lhainag
- Lhai’u’gyü
- Lhajam
- Lhari
- Lhasa
- Lhasoi
- Lhato
- Lhatog
- Lhazê
- Lhazhong
- Lhoma
- Lhomar
- Lhorong
- Lhünzê
- Lhünzhub (Gandainqonkor)
- Lhunzhub Nongchang
- Lingka
- Lingqu
- Lingti
- Lingza
- Logtang
- Lopu
- Lugu
- Lumachomo
- Lumaringbo
- Lunang
- Lungdo
- Lunggar
- Lungmar
- Lungsang
- Lungzhong
- Lura

== M ==
- Mabja
- Macala
- Mainacun
- Mainda
- Maindong
- Maindu
- Mainkung
- Mainpu
- Maiyü
- Malilang
- Mamba
- Mamta
- Mangra
- Mani
- Maoniupo
- Maqên
- Mar (Marqu)
- Mardêng
- Margyang
- Markam
- Marmê
- Marri
- Mêdog
- Mêdogdêng
- Mêmo
- Mentang
- Midika
- Moincêr
- Momo’ngar
- Mugarripug
- Mükangsar

== N ==
- Nagarzê
- Nagjog
- Nagqu
- Nailung
- Naixi
- Naiyü
- Naizha
- Nala’nga
- Namco
- Namgyaigang
- Namgyaixoi
- Namka
- Namling
- Namoding
- Namoqê
- Namru
- Nangxian
- Napug
- Naqên
- Narüdo
- Nayag
- Nêdong
- Ngamda
- Ngamringxoi
- Ngangca
- Nganggug
- Ngarnang
- Ngarzhag
- Ngiangri
- Ngomdo
- Ngoqudoima
- Ngoqumaima
- Ngükang
- Ngüxoi
- Noh
- Norbukyungzê
- Norcang
- Nordê
- Norma
- Nujiang
- Numari
- Nyaimai
- Nyainrong
- Nyangbo
- Nyangri
- Nyêmo
- Nyêru
- Nyêtang
- Nyêwo
- Nyigê
- Nyima
- Nyingchi
- Nyingda
- Nyingzhong
- Nyixung
- Nyizhê
- Nyogzê
- Nyugku

== O ==
- Oibab
- Oiga
- Oiyug
- Oma
- Ombu
- Orma

== P ==
- Padain
- Paggai
- Paggor
- Pana
- Pagri
- Painbo Nongchang
- Paingar
- Par
- Parco
- Parding
- Parling
- Parlung Zangbo
- Pana
- Parta
- Paryang
- Pazhug
- Pêlung
- Pêxung
- Poindo
- Poinsog
- Pompain
- Pongda
- Porgyang
- Pubu
- Pula
- Püncogling
- Punzom
- Puqu
- Purgadala

== Q ==
- Qabgar
- Qabnag
- Qagbasêrag
- Qagcaka
- Qagzê
- Qainaqangma
- Qajortêbu
- Qamdo
- Qamdün
- Qamqênxoi
- Qangba
- Qangdoi
- Qangmai
- Qangzê
- Qarasa
- Qayü
- Qêqên
- Qêri
- Qiangma
- Qigêgyizhungma
- Qinglung
- Qingtü
- Qizhong
- Qoi
- Qoidêkong
- Qoidên
- Qomo
- Qonggyaixoi
- Qugaryartang
- Qugcang
- Qugcodoi
- Qujang
- Qulho
- Qumdo
- Qumig
- Qumigxung
- Qunaggai
- Qungdo’gyang
- Qungtag
- Quntamari
- Qu’nyido
- Qu’og
- Qusum
- Quxam

== R ==
- Rabang
- Rabgyailing
- Rabka
- Rabqên
- Racaka
- Ragxi
- Raixarma
- Raka
- Ramai
- Ramba
- Rangzhub
- Rawu
- Rayü
- Ribxi
- Ridung
- Rigong
- Rila
- Rimar
- Rinbung
- Rindü
- Ringtor
- Rinqênzê
- Risong
- Risum
- Ritang
- Rixoi
- Ro’gyog
- Rolagang
- Rongbo
- Rongma
- Rongmê
- Rongpu Si
- Rongqu
- Rongxar
- Rongxar
- Rubba
- Rusar
- Rutog

== S ==
- Sa’gyari
- Sa’ngain
- Sadêng
- Sadengmucun
- Saga
- Sagang
- Sagyaxoi
- Sainca
- Saiqu
- Samai
- Samaixung
- Samarda
- Sambriāl
- Samcang
- Samka
- Samsang
- Samyai
- Sanagda
- Sancam
- Sangba
- Sangdê
- Sanglai
- Sangmenzhang
- Sangnag Choling
- Sangri
- Sangsang
- Sangxung
- Sanor
- Sapügang
- Sar
- Sato
- Sêbrong
- Sêlêpug
- Sênco
- Sêndo
- Sêngdo
- Sêngdoi
- Sênggêkanbab
- Sêrca
- Sêrdê
- Sêrkang
- Sêrlung
- Seronggang
- Sêrtang
- Sêwa
- Sewu
- Shangzayü
- Shela
- Shelkar
- Shigatse
- Shiquanhe (Sênggê)
- Shürong
- Sima
- Sinda
- Sogba
- Sogdoi
- Sogma
- Sogmai
- Sogxung
- Soila
- Sokai
- Sumxi
- Sumzom
- Surco

== T ==
- Taglung
- Taizhao
- Taktsang
- Talu
- Tamze
- Tangdê
- Tanggar
- Tanggo
- Tanggyai
- Tanglhai
- Tangluqangma
- Tangmai
- Targyailing
- Tarmar
- Têbo
- Têmarxung
- Têmo
- Têring
- Tiangacun
- Tingri
- Tirkang
- Toba
- Tobgyai
- Togqên
- Toinqu
- Toling
- Tomra
- Tongpu
- Toudaoban
- Tuglung
- Tuma
- Tungdor
- Tunggar
- Tungru

== U ==
- Urdoi
- Urmai
- Uxu

== V ==
- Valuxai

== W ==
- Wangda
- Wangdain
- Wangdian
- Wangkar
- Woinbodol
- Wüjang
- Wulang
- Wumatang

== X ==
- Xabyai
- Xaga
- Xagar
- Xagjang
- Xagnag
- Xago
- Xagquka
- Xainza
- Xalazakung
- Xangzha
- Xardong
- Xarlung
- Xarma
- Xaxa
- Xayag
- Xênkyêr
- Xêxung
- Xia Lingka
- Xiazayü
- Xiayanjingxiang
- Xingba
- Xinrong
- Xiongmei
- Xobando
- Xognga
- Xoi
- Xoisar
- Xoka
- Xongmai
- Xümo
- Xungba
- Xungqên
- Xungru

== Y ==
- Yadong
- Yagra
- Yaiba
- Yamo
- Ya’ngamdo
- Yangbajain
- Yanhu
- Yanshiping
- Yardoi
- Yarong
- Yarzhong
- Yêndum
- Yi’ong
- Yubzha
- Yudo
- Yümai
- Yumco

== Z ==
- Zaindainxoi
- Zaisang
- Zala
- Zamar
- Za’ngoza’ngoin
- Zangqênrong
- Zangxoi
- Zapug
- Zaqog
- Zaragoy
- Zari
- Zaxoi
- Zayul
- Zêba
- Zêsum
- Zhabdün
- Zhabsang
- Zhainzê
- Zhamo
- Zhangdong
- Zhangmu
- Zharen
- Zhasa
- Zhaxigang
- Zhaxizê
- Zhêxam
- Zhigung
- ZhongLingka
- Zhongzê
- Zhowagoin
- Zhugla
- Zhuglung
- Zhujia
- Zigar
- Zingqi
- Zito
- Zoco
- Zongga
- Zongxoi
