= List of township-level divisions of the Tibet Autonomous Region =

Location of Tibet Autonomous Region

This is a list of township-level divisions of Tibet Autonomous Region (TAR), People's Republic of China (PRC). After province, prefecture, and county-level divisions, township-level divisions constitute the formal fourth-level administrative divisions of the PRC. As of the end of 2014, there are a total of 691 such divisions in TAR, divided into 9 subdistricts, 140 towns, 534 townships, and 8 ethnic townships.

== Lhasa ==
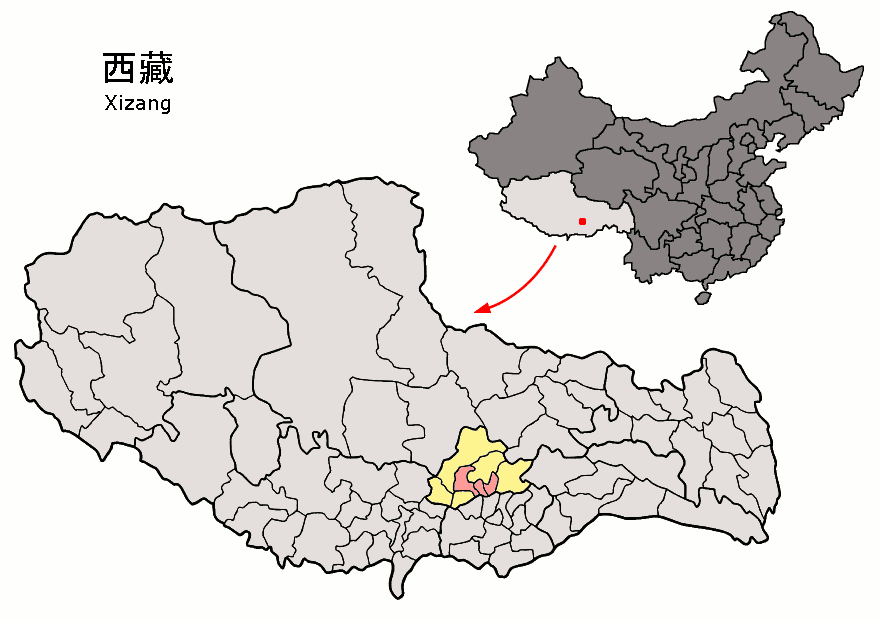
Location of Lhasa (district in pink, rest of administrative area in yellow) in the Autonomous region

=== Chengguan District ===
Subdistricts (དོན་གཅོད་ཁྲུའུ་ or དོན་གཅོད་ཅུས་; Toinjoichu)

- Caigungtang Subdistrict (ཚལ་གུང་ཐང་དོན་གཅོད་ཁྲུའུ་; 蔡公堂街道), Chabxi Subdistrict (གྲ་བཞི་དོན་གཅོད་ཁྲུའུ་; 扎细街道), Garmagoinsar Subdistrict (ཀརྨ་མ་ཀུན་བཟང་དོན་གཅོད་ཁྲུའུ་; 嘎玛贡桑街道), Gündêling Subdistrict (ཀུན་བདེ་གླིང་དོན་གཅོད་ཁྲུའུ་; 公德林街道), Gyirai Subdistrict (སྐྱིད་རས་དོན་གཅོད་ཁྲུའུ་; 吉日街道), Jêbumgang Subdistrict (རྗེ་འབུམ་སྒང་དོན་གཅོད་ཁྲུའུ་; 吉崩岗街道), Jinzhu West Road Subdistrict (བཅིངས་འགྲོལ་ནུབ་ལམ་དོན་གཅོད་ཁྲུའུ་; 金珠西路街道), Liangdao Subdistrict (ལེང་ཏའོ་དོན་གཅོད་ཁྲུའུ་; 两岛街道), Ngaqên Subdistrict (སྣ་ཆེན་དོན་གཅོད་ཁྲུའུ་; 纳金街道), Nyangrain Subdistrict (ཉང་བྲན་དོན་གཅོད་ཁྲུའུ་; 娘热街道), Pargor Subdistrict (བར་སྒོར་དོན་གཅོད་ཁྲུའུ་; 八廓街道), Togdê Subdistrict (དོག་སྡེ་དོན་གཅོད་ཁྲུའུ་; 夺底街道)

=== Doilungdêqên District ===
Subdistricts

- Donggar Subdistrict (གདོང་དཀར་དོན་གཅོད་ཁྲུའུ་, 东嘎街道), Naiqung Subdistrict (གནས་ཆུང་དོན་གཅོད་ཁྲུའུ་, 乃琼街道), Yabda Subdistrict (ཡབ་མདའ་དོན་གཅོད་ཁྲུའུ་, 羊达街道), Liuwu (Niu) Subdistrict (སྣེའུ་དོན་གཅོད་ཁྲུའུ་, 柳梧街道)

Townships (ཤང་; Xang)

- Dêqên Township (བདེ་ཆེན་, 德庆乡), Mar Township (དམར་, 马乡), Gurum Township (རྒུ་རུམ་, 古荣乡).

=== Dagzê District ===
The only town (གྲོང་རྡལ་; Chongdai) is Dagzê Town (སྟག་རྩེ་, 德庆镇)

Townships

- Targyai Township (དར་རྒྱས་, 塔杰乡), Zangdog Township (གཙང་ཏོག་, 章多乡), Tanggar Township (ཐང་དགར་, 唐嘎乡), Xoi Township (ཞོག་མདའ་, 雪乡), Dromdoi Township (འབྲོམ་སྟོད།་, 帮堆乡).

=== Damxung County ===
Towns

- Damquka Town (འདམ་ཆུ་ཁ་, 当曲卡镇), Yangbajain Town (ཡངས་པ་ཅན་, 羊八井镇)

Townships

- Gyaidar Township (རྒྱས་དར་, 格达乡), Nyingzhung Township (སྙིང་དྲུང་, 宁中乡), Gongtang Township (ཀོང་ཐང་, 公塘乡), Lungring Township (ལུང་རིང་, 龙仁乡), Wumatang Township (དབུ་མ་ཐང་, 乌玛塘乡), Namco Township (གནམ་མཚོ་, 纳木错乡).

=== Lhünzhub County ===
The only town is Ganden Chökhor (Lhünzhub) Town (དགའ་ལྡན་ཆོས་འཁོར་, (ལྷུན་གྲུབ་) (甘丹曲果镇)

Townships

- Codoi Township (མཚོ་སྟོད་, 春堆乡), Karze Township (མཁར་རྩེ་, 卡孜乡), Qangka Township (བྱང་ཁ་, 强嘎乡), Sumchêng Township (གསུམ་འཕྲེང་, 松盘乡), Jangraxa Township (ལྕང་ར་ཤར་, 江热夏乡), Banjorling Township (དཔལ་འབྱོར་གླིང་, 边角林乡), Pundo Township (ཕུ་མདོ་, 旁多乡), Ngarnang Township (ངར་ནང་, 阿朗乡), Tanggo Township (ཐང་མགོ་, 唐古乡).

=== Maizhokunggar County ===
The only town is Kunggar Town (གུང་དཀར་, 工卡镇)

Townships

- Gyama Township (རྒྱ་མ་, 甲玛乡), Tanggya Township (ཐང་སྐྱ་, 唐加乡), Zhaxigeng Township (བཀྲ་ཤིས་སྒང་, 扎西岗乡), Nyimajangra Township (ཉི་མ་ལྕང་རྭ་, 尼玛江热乡), Zaxoi Township (རྩ་ཞོལ་, 扎雪乡), Rutog Township (རུ་ཐོག་, 日多乡), Mamba Township (རྨམ་པ།་, 门巴乡).

=== Nyêmo County ===
The only town is Tarrong Town (དར་གྲོང་, 塔荣镇)

Townships

- Toinba Township (ཐོན་པ་, 吞巴乡), Xumai Township (གཞུ་སྨད་, 续迈乡), Pusum Township (ཕུ་གསུམ་, 普松乡), Paggor Township (བྲག་སྐོར་, 帕故乡), Margyang Township (མར་རྐྱང་, 麻江乡), Karru Township (མཁར་རུ་, 克如乡), Nyêmo Township (སྙེ་མོ་, 尼木乡).

=== Qüxü County ===
The only town is Qüxü Town (ཆུ་ཤུར་, 曲水镇)

Townships

- Nyêtang Township (མཉེས་ཐང་, 聂当乡), Carbanang Township (མཚར་པ་ནང་, 茶巴拉乡), Caina Township (ཚལ་སྣ་, 才纳乡), Nam Township (གནམ་, 南木乡), Dagar Township (རྟ་དཀར་, 达嘎乡).

== Qamdo (Chamdo) ==
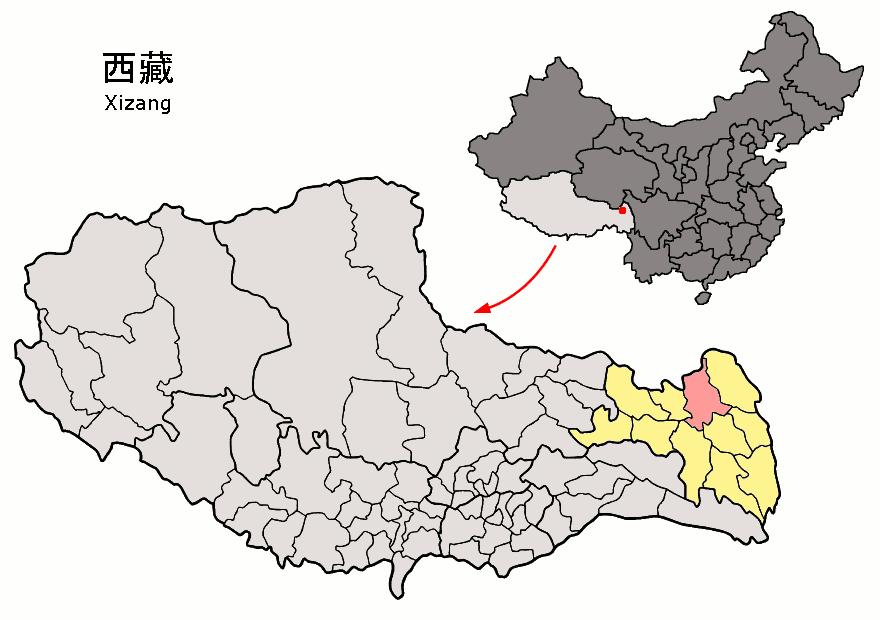
Location of Qamdo (district in pink, rest of administrative area in yellow) in the Autonomous region

=== Karub District ===
Towns

- Chengguan Town (ཁྲིན་ཀོན་རྡལ་, 城关镇), Guro Town (འགུ་རོ་, 俄洛镇), Karub Town (མཁར་རོ་, 卡若镇)

Townships

- Momda Township (རྨོ་མདའ་, 芒达乡), Sagang Township (ས་རྒང་, 沙贡乡), Ormaika Township (ཨོར་སྨད་ཁ་, 若巴乡), Ngêxi Township (རྔེ་གཤེས་, 埃西乡), Ruxi Township (རུ་བཞི་, 如意乡), Retong Township (རེ་ཐོང་, 日通乡), Cêrwai Township (ཚེར་དབད་, 柴维乡), Toba Township (ཐོ་པ་, 妥坝乡), Karma Township (ཀ་རྨ་, 嘎玛乡), Mainda Township (སྨན་མདའ་, 面达乡), Yorba Township (ཡོར་པ་, 约巴乡), Latog Township (ལྷ་ཐོག་, 拉多乡)

=== Jomda County ===
Towns

- Jomda Town (འཇོ་མདའ་, 江达镇), Gamtog Town (སྐམ་ཐོག་, 岗托镇)

Townships

- Qongkor Township (ཆོས་འཁོར་, 邓柯乡), Üpäl Township (ཨུད་དཔལ་, 岩比乡), Kargang Township (མཁར་སྒང་, 卡贡乡), Sibda Township (སྲིབ་མདའ་, 生达乡), Nyaxi Township (ཉ་གཤིས་, 娘西乡), Zigar Township (རྫི་སྒར་, 字呷乡), Qu'nyido Township (ཆུ་གཉེས་མདོ་, 青泥洞乡), Woinbodoi Township (དབོན་པོ་སྟོད་, 汪布顶乡), Dêrdoin Township (གཏེར་སྟོན་, 德登乡), Tongpu Township (གདོང་ཕུ་, 同普乡), Bolo Township (སྤོ་, 波罗乡)

=== Gonjo County ===
The only town is Bolo Town (འབོ་ལོ་, 莫洛镇)

Townships

- Mindo Township (མིག་མདོ་, 敏都乡), Zêba Township (རྩེ་བ་, 则巴乡), Langmai Township (གླང་སྨད་, 罗麦乡), Sêrdong Township (གསེར་གདོང་, 沙东乡), Kêrri Township (ཁེར་རི་, 克日乡), Bumgyê Township (འབུམ་སྐྱེས་, 木协乡), Awang Township (ཨ་དབང་, 阿旺乡), Lhato Township (ལྷ་ཐོ་, 拉妥乡), Qangsum Township (བྱང་གསུམ་, 雄松乡), Lha'gyai Township (ལྷ་རྒྱལ་, 哈加乡), Gyanbê Township (སྐྱ་འབེལ་, 相皮乡)

=== Banbar County ===
Towns

- Banbar Town (དཔལ་འབར་, 边坝镇), Coka Town (མཚོ་ཁ་, 草卡镇)

Townships

- Mau Township (རྨའུ་, 马武乡), Rayü Township (ར་ཡུལ་, 热玉乡), Nyinmo Township (ཉིན་མོ་, 尼木乡), Sadêng Township (ས་སྟེང་, 沙丁乡), Jiling Township (སྤྱི་གླིང་, 金岭乡), Jaggong Township (ལྕགས་གོང་, 加贡乡), Marxog Township (མར་ཤོག་, 马秀乡), Dowa Township (དོ་, 都瓦乡), Lhazê Township (ལྷ་རྩེ་, 拉孜乡)

=== Baxoi County ===
- Baima (པད་མ་, 白玛镇), Ra'og (རྭ་འོག་, 然乌镇), Bangda (སྤང་མདའ་, 帮达镇), Tanggar (ཐང་དཀར་, 同卡镇)

Townships

- Lingka Township (གླིང་ཁ་, 林卡乡), Gyari Township (སྐྱ་རི་, 夏里乡), Yangpa Township (ཡངས་པ་, 拥乡), Wa Township (ཝ་, 瓦乡), Gyêda Township (སྐྱེ་མདའ་, 吉达乡), Karwa pêkyim Township (མཁར་བ་འཕེལ་ཁྱིམ་, 卡瓦白庆乡), Jirong Township (དཀྱིལ་གྲོང་, 集中乡), Yiqên Township (ཡིད་ཆེན་, 益庆乡), Lagê Township (གླ་སྐེ་, 拉根乡), Korqên Township (འཁོར་ཆེན་, 郭庆乡)

=== Dêngqên County ===
Towns

- Dêngqên Town (སྟེང་ཆེན་, 丁青镇), Trido Town (ཁྲི་རྡོ་, 尺牍镇)

Townships

- Sagang Township (ས་སྒང་, 沙贡乡), Muta Township (དམུ་ཐ་, 木塔乡), Bota Township (འབོ་ཐ་, 布塔乡), Pada Township (སྤ་ཟླ་, 巴达乡), Gangé Township (གྭ་ངད་, 甘岩乡), Gata Township (གྭ་ཐ་, 嘎塔乡), Sertsa Township (སེར་ཚ་, 色扎乡), Zhezhung Township (ཞེ་གཞུང་, 协雄乡), Sado Township (ས་མདོ་, 桑多乡), Damdoi Township (གཏམ་སྟོད་, 当堆乡), Gyang Ngön Township (གྱང་སྔོན་, 觉恩乡)

=== Lhorong County ===
Towns

- Dzito Town (རྫི་ཐོ་, 孜托镇), Xobando Town (ཤོ་པ་མདོ་, 硕督镇), Khangsar Town (ཁང་གསར་, 康沙镇), Marri Town (དམར་རི་, 马利镇)

Townships

- Yülzhi Township (ཡུལ་བཞི་, 玉西乡), Shingrong Township (ཤིང་རོང་, 新荣乡), Dakrong Township (གདགས་རོང་, 达龙乡), Nagchok Township (ནག་ལྕོག་, 腊久乡), Ngülshö Township (རྔུལ་ཤོད་, 俄西乡), Kungye Sumdo Township (ཀུང་ཡས་གསུམ་མདོ་, 中亦乡), Pedak Township (པད་གདགས་, 白达乡)

=== Markam County ===
Towns

- Gartok Town (སྒར་ཐོག་, 嘎托镇), Rongmé Town (རོང་སྨད་, 如美镇)

Townships

- Chutsenkha Township (ཆུ་ཚན་ཁ་, 曲孜卡乡), Mokshö Township (རྨོག་ཤོད་, 木许乡), Jangpa Miri Township (འཇང་པ་མི་རི་, 纳西民族乡), Chupalung Township (གྲུ་པ་ལུང་, 朱巴龙乡), Chörten Township (མཆོད་རྟེན་, 曲登乡), Jidrong Township (བྱིས་གྲོངས་, 徐中乡), Pangda Township (སྤང་མདའ་, 帮达乡), Göpo Township (རྒོད་པོ་, 戈波乡), Norné Township (ནོར་གནས་, 洛尼乡), Co'nga Township (མཚོ་རྔ་, 措瓦乡), Gardo Township (མགར་མདོ་, 昂多乡), Tsangshö Township (གཙང་ཤོད་, 宗西乡), Bumpa Township (འབུམ་པ་, 莽岭乡), Zurdeshö Township (ཟུར་བདེ་ཤོད་, 索多西乡)

=== Riwoqê County ===
Towns

- Samdo Town (ས་མདོ་, 桑多镇), Riwoqê Town (རི་བོ་ཆེ་, 类乌齐镇)

Townships

- Jigdoi Township (ལྗིག་སྟོད་, 吉多乡), Kangda Township (རྐང་མདའ་, 岗色乡), Pênda Township (བེའུ་མདའ་, 宾达乡), Karmardo Township (མཁ་ར་དམར་མདོ་, 卡玛多乡), Samka Township (ཟམ་ཁ་, 尚卡乡), Qukoido Township (ཆུ་ཁོལ་མདོ་, 伊日乡), Jagsamka Township (ལྕགས་ཟམ་ཁ་, 甲桑卡乡), Chamoling Township (ཁྲ་མོ་གླིང་, 长毛岭乡)

=== Zhag'yab County ===
Towns

- Yêndum Town (དབྱེན་འདུམ་, 烟多镇), Gyithang Town (དཀྱིལ་ཐང་, 吉塘镇), Jamdün Town (བྱངས་མདུན་, 香堆镇)

Townships

- Zangsar Township (གཙང་གསར་, 宗沙乡), Khentang Township (འཁན་ཐང་, 肯通乡), Korra Township (འཁོར་རྭ་, 扩达乡), Shingka Township (ཤིང་དཀའ་, 新卡乡), Wakhar Township (ཝ་མཁར་, 王卡乡), Acur Township (ཨ་ཚུར་, 阿孜乡), Pelri Township (དཔལ་རི་, 巴日乡), Rangzhub Township (རང་གྲུང་, 荣周乡), Kargong Township (མཁར་སྒང་, 卡贡乡), Calamdo Township (ཚྭ་ལ་མདོ་, 察拉乡)

=== Zogang County ===
Towns

- Uyak Town (དབུ་ཡག་, 旺达镇), Temtok Town (ཐེམ་ཐོག་, 田妥镇), Oktang Town (འོག་ཐང་, 扎玉镇)

Townships

- Dobbar Township (སྟོབས་འབར་, 东坝乡), Zhong Lingka Township (ཀྲུང་གླིང་ཁ་, 中林卡乡), Maiyü Township (སྨད་ཡུལ་, 美玉乡), Zhalingkha Township (ཞྭ་གླིང་ཁ་, 下林卡乡), Pütog Township (བུལ་ཐོག་, 碧土乡), Rigo Township (རི་མགོ་, 仁果乡), Rabchen Township (རབ་ཆེན་, 绕金乡)

== Xigazê (Shigatse) ==
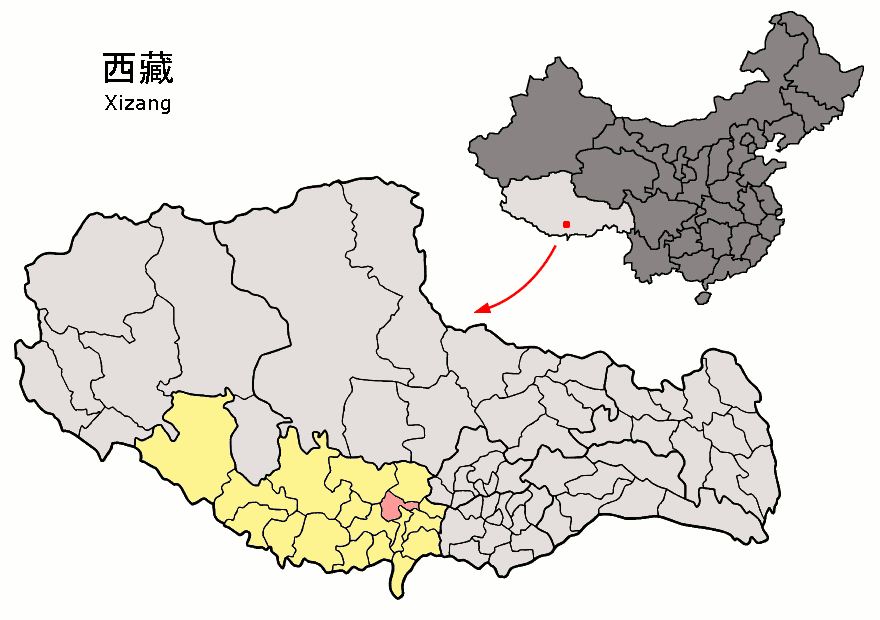
Location of Xigazê (district in pink, rest of administrative area in yellow) in the Autonomous region

=== Samzhubzê District ===
Subdistricts

- Chengbei Subdistrict (གྲོང་བྱང་དོན་གཅོད་, 城北街道) and Chengnan Subdistrict (གྲོང་ལྷོ་དོན་གཅོད་, 城南街道)

Townships

- Lhain Township (ལྷན་, 联乡), Nyamo Township (ཉ་མོ་, 年木乡), Jangdam Township (ལྕགས་འདམ་, 江当乡), Benxung Township (སྤེན་གཞུང་, 边雄乡), Donggar Township (གདོང་དཀར་, 东嘎乡), Nyarixung Township (ཉ་རི་གཞུང་, 聂日雄乡), Gyacoxung Township (རྒྱ་མཚོ་གཞུང་, 甲措雄乡), Qugboxung Township (ཕྱུག་པོ་གཞུང་, 曲布雄乡), Qumig Township (ཆུ་མིག་, 曲美乡), Nar Township (སྣར་ང་, 纳尔乡).

=== Bainang County ===
Towns

- Norbu Khyungtse Town (ནོར་བུ་ཁྱུང་རྩེ་, 洛江镇), Gadong Town (སྒ་གདོང་, 嘎东镇)

Townships

- Pältsel Township (དཔལ་ཚལ་, 巴扎乡), Mak Township (མག་, 玛乡), Wangden Township (དབང་ལྡན་, 旺丹乡), Qunub Township (ཆུ་ནུབ་, 曲奴乡), Düjung Township (འདུས་བྱུང་, 杜琼乡), Jangtö Township (བྱང་སྟོད་, 强堆乡), Gabug Township (སྒ་སྦུག་, 嘎普乡), Tashar Township (བཀྲ་ཤར་, 者下乡), Tongshé Township (སྟོང་ཤེ་, 东喜乡).

=== Dinggyê County ===
Towns

- Gyangkar Town (རྒྱལ་མཁར་, 江嘎镇), Ri'og Town (རི་འོག་, 日屋镇), Chentang Town (འདྲེན་ཐང་, 陈塘镇)

Townships

- Gojag Township (ཀོ་ལྕག་, 郭加乡), Sar Township (གཟར་, 萨尔乡), Kyungzê Township (ཁྱུང་རྩེ་, 琼孜乡), Dinggyê Township (གདིང་སྐྱེས་, 定结乡), Qab Township (ཆབ་, 确布乡), Dozhag Township (རྡོ་བྲག་, 多布扎乡), Tashi Nang Township (བཀྲ་ཤིས་སྣང་, 扎西岗乡).

=== Gamba County ===
The only town is Gamba Town (གམ་པ་, 岗巴镇)

Townships

- Lungrong Township (ལུང་རོང་, 隆中乡), Gurme Township (གུར་མེ་, 孔玛乡), Chig Township (འགྲིགས་, 直克乡), Changlung Township (གྲང་ལུང་, 昌龙乡).

=== Gyangzê (Gyantse) County ===
The only town is Gyangzê (Gyantse) Town (རྒྱལ་རྩེ་, 江孜镇)

Townships

- Naröl Township (ན་རོལ་, 纳如乡), Kardoi Township (མཁར་སྟོད་, 卡堆乡), Karmai Township (མཁར་སྨད་, 卡麦乡), Tsangkha Township (གཙང་ཁ་, 藏改乡), Rinang Township (རི་ནང་, 日朗乡), Dagzê Township (སྟག་རྩེ་, 达孜乡), Rasog Township (ར་སོག་, 热索乡), Drongtsé Township (འབྲོང་རྩེ་, 重孜乡), Lungmar Township (ལུང་དམར་, 龙马乡), Tsechen Township (རྩེ་ཆེན་, 紫金乡), Jangra Township (ལྕང་ར་, 江热乡), Nyangdoi Township (མྱང་སྟོད་, 年堆乡), Kangco Township (གངས་མཚོ་, 康卓乡), Gyinkar Township (དཀྱིལ་མཁར་, 金嘎乡), Rizhing Township (རི་ཞིང་, 日星乡), Ralung Township (ར་ལུང་, 热龙乡), Charing Township (ཁྲ་རིང་, 车仁乡), Jaggyê Township (ལྕགས་སྒྱེ་, 加克西乡).

=== Gyirong County ===
Towns

- Zongga Town (རྫོང་དགའ་, 宗嘎镇), Gyirong Town (སྐྱིད་གྲོང་, 吉隆镇)

Townships

- Zhêba Township (ཀྲེ་པ་, 折巴乡), Kungtang Township(གུང་ཐང་, 贡当乡), Chagna Township (བྲག་སྣ་, 差那乡).

=== Kangmar County ===
The only town is Kangmar Town (ཁང་དམར་, 康马镇)

Townships

- Namnying Township (གནམ་རྙིང་, 南尼乡), Sapügang Township (ས་ཕུད་སྒང་, 少岗乡), Kamru Township (གམ་རུ་, 康如乡), Zhontreng Township (བཞོན་འཕྲེང་, 雄章乡), Samada Township (ས་མ་མདའ་, 萨玛达乡), Gala Township (ཀ་ལ་, 嘎拉乡), Nyêrudoi Township (ཉེ་རུ་སྟོད་, 涅如堆乡), Nyêrumai Township (ཉེ་རུ་སྨད་, 涅如麦乡).

=== Lhazê (Lhatse) County ===
Towns

- Lhazê Town (ལྷ་རྩེ་, 拉孜镇), Quxar Town (ཆུ་ཤར་, 曲下镇)

Townships

- Tashi Dzom Township (བཀྲ་ཤིས་འཛོམས་, 扎西宗乡), Qoima Township (ཆོས་མ་, 曲玛乡), Püncogling Township (ཕུན་ཚོགས་གླིང་, 彭措林乡), Tashigang Township (བཀྲ་ཤིས་སྒང་, 扎西岗乡), Liu Township (སླེའུ་, 柳乡), Resa Township (རེ་ས་, 热萨乡), Mangpu Township (མང་ཕུ་, 芒普乡), Xiqên Township (གཞིས་ཆེན་, 锡钦乡), Chau Township (གྲའུ་, 查务乡).

=== Namling County ===
The only town is Namling Town (རྣམ་གླིང་, 南木林镇)

Townships

- Car Township (ཚར་, 查尔乡), Dagna Township (སྟག་སྣ་, 达那乡), Doqoi Township (མདོ་མཆོད་, 多角乡), Êma Township (ཡེ་མ་, 艾玛乡), Gyamco Township (རྒྱ་མཚོ་, 甲措乡), Karzê Township (མཁར་རྩེ་, 卡孜乡), Lhabupu Township (ལྷ་བུ་ཕུ་, 拉布普乡), Mangra Township (མང་ར་, 芒热乡), Numa Township (ནུ་མ་, 奴玛乡), Putang Township (ཕུ་ཐང་, 普当乡), Dakce Township (སྟག་རྩེ་, 达孜乡), Qum Township (ཆུམ་, 秋木乡), Ratang Township (ར་ཐང་, 热当乡), Rindü Township (རིན་འདུས་, 仁堆乡), Sogqên Township (སོག་ཆེན་, 索金乡), Tobgyai Township (ཐོབ་རྒྱལ་, 土布加乡).

=== Ngamring County ===
Towns

- Gegang Town (གད་སྒང་, 卡嘎镇), Sangsang Town (བཟང་བཟང་, 桑桑镇)

Townships

- Yagmo Township (ཡག་མོ་, 亚木乡), Dagyu Township (རྟ་རྒྱུད་, 达居乡), Qu'og Township (ཆུ་འོག་, 秋窝乡), Kairag Township (གད་རགས་, 切热乡), Dobê Township (མདོ་སྤེ་, 多白乡), Riwoqê Township (རི་བོ་ཆེ་, 日吾其乡), Xungba Township (གཞུང་བ་, 雄巴乡), Cazê Township (ཚྭ་རྩེ་, 查孜乡), Amxung Township (ཨམ་གཞུང་, 阿木雄乡), Rusar Township (རུ་གསར་, 如沙乡), Kunglung Township (གུང་ལུང་, 孔隆乡), Nyigo Township (ཉི་སྒོ་, 尼果乡), Comë Township (ཚོ་སྨད་, 措迈乡), Darog Township (རྟ་རོག་, 达若乡), Goin'gyibug Township (དགོན་སྐྱིད་སྦུག་, 贡久布乡).

=== Nyalam County ===
Towns

- Nyalam Town (གནའ་ལམ་, 聂拉木镇), Dram Town (འགྲམ་, 樟木镇)

Townships

- Yarlêb Township (ཡར་སླེབས་, 亚来乡), Zurco Township (ཟུར་མཚོ་, 琐作乡), Nailung Township (ནས་ལུང་, 乃龙乡), Mainpu Township (སྨན་ཕུ་, 门布乡), Borong Township (སྤོ་རོང་, 波绒乡).

=== Rinbung County ===
The only town is Dê'gyiling Town (བདེ་སྐྱིད་གླིང་, 德吉林镇)

Townships

- Chagba Township (བྲག་པ་, 查巴乡), Kangxung Township (ཁང་གཞུང་, 康雄乡), Moin Township (སྨོན་, 母乡), Bartang Township (བར་ཐང་, 帕当乡), Pusum Township (ཕུ་གསུམ་, 普松乡), Qewa Township (བྱེ་བ་, 切娃乡), Ramba Township (རམ་པ་, 然巴乡), Rinbung Township (རིན་སྤུངས་, 仁布乡).

=== Sa'gya County ===
Towns

- Sa'gya Town (ས་སྐྱ་, 萨迦镇), Gêding Town (དགེ་སྡེངས་, 吉定镇)

Townships

- Xungmai Township (གཞུང་སྨད་, 雄麦乡), Maja Township (རྨ་བྱ་, 麻布加乡), Zhungma Township (གཞོང་མ་, 雄玛乡), Tashigang Township (བཀྲ་ཤིས་སྒང་, 扎西岗乡), Chagjug Township (བྲག་མཇུག་, 扯休乡), Së Township (སྲད་, 赛乡), Lalho Township (ལ་ལྷོ་, 拉洛乡), Drag'rong Township (བྲག་རོང་, 查荣乡), Molha Township (མོ་ལྷ་, 木拉乡).

=== Saga County ===
The only town is Gya'gya Town (སྐྱ་སྐྱ་, 加加镇)

Townships

- Changgo Township (འཕྲང་སྒོ་, 昌果乡), Xungru Township (གཞུང་རུ་, 雄如乡), Lhagcang Township (ལྷག་ཚང་, 拉藏乡), Ru’gyog Township (རུ་ཀྱོག་, 如角乡), Targyailing Township (དར་རྒྱས་གླིང་, 达吉岭乡), Dênggar Township (སྟེང་དཀར་, 旦嘎乡), Xarru Township (ཤར་རུ་, 夏如乡).

=== Tingri County ===
Towns

- Shelkar Town (ཤེལ་དཀར་, 协格尔镇), Gangga Town (སྒང་དགའ་, 岗嘎镇)

Townships

- Qutang Township (ཆུ་ཐང་, 曲当乡), Tashi Dzom Township (བཀྲ་ཤིས་འཛོམས་, 扎西宗乡), Kaimar Township (གད་དམར་, 克玛乡), Ronxar Township (རོང་ཤར་, 绒辖乡), Cogo Township (མཚོ་སྒོ་, 措果乡), Qulho Township (ཆུ་ལྷོ་, 曲洛乡), Chamco Township (གྲམ་མཚོ་, 长所乡), Nyixar Township (ཉི་ཤར་, 尼辖乡), Zagor Township (རྩ་སྐོར་, 扎果乡), Pain'gyi Township (ཕན་སྐྱིད་, 盆吉乡), Gyaco Township (བརྒྱ་ཚོ་, 加措乡).

=== Xaitongmoin County ===
The only town is Chabkha Town (ཆབ་ཁ་, 卡嘎镇)

Townships

- Tongmoin Township (མཐོང་སྨོན་, 通门乡), Rungma Township (རུང་མ་, 荣玛乡), Tarding Township (དར་སྡིངས་, 塔丁乡), Danagpu Township (རྟ་ནག་ཕུ་, 达那普乡), Namoqê Township (ན་མོ་ཆེ་, 南木切乡), Ringqênzê Township (རིན་ཆེན་རྩེ་, 仁钦则乡), Dagmoxar Township (སྟག་མོ་ཤར་, 达木夏乡), Mübaqêqên Township (མུས་པ་བྱེས་ཆེན་, 美巴切钦乡), Qingtü Township (བྱིན་མཐུ་, 青都乡), Qêqung Township (བྱེ་ཆུང་, 切琼乡), Nartang Township (སྣར་ཐང་, 纳当乡), Tsozhi Township (ཚོ་བཞི་, 措布西乡), Nyangra Township (ཉང་ར་, 娘热乡), Zêxong Township (རྩེ་གཤོངས་, 则许乡), Chuzhig Township (ཕྲུ་སྒྲིག་, 春哲乡), Capu Township (ཚ་ཕུ་, 查布乡), Danagda Township (རྟ་ནག་མདའ་, 达那答乡), Lêba Township (སླེ་པ་, 列巴乡).

=== Yadong (Dromo) County ===
Towns

- Xarsingma Town (ཤར་གསིང་མ་, 下司马镇), Pagri Town (ཕག་རི་, 帕里镇)

Townships

- Gêrru Township (སྒེར་རུ་, 吉汝乡), Gambu Township (ཁམ་བུ་, 康布乡), Rübunggang Township (རུད་སྲུངས་སྒང་, 上亚东乡), Düna Township (དུད་སྣ་, 堆纳乡), Down Dromo Township (གྲོ་མོ་སྨད་, 下亚东乡).

=== Zhongba County ===
The only town is Baryang Town (བར་ཡངས་, 帕羊镇)

Townships

- Labrang Township (ལ་བྲང་, 拉让乡), Bodoi Township (སྤོ་སྟོད་, 布多乡), Gêla Township (སྐེད་ལ་, 吉拉乡), Gyêma Township (སྐྱེ་མ་, 吉玛乡), Horpa Township (ཧོར་པ་, 霍尔巴乡), Lunggar Township (ལུང་དཀར་, 隆嘎尔乡), Nagqu Township (ནག་ཆུ་, 纳久乡), Penchi Township (ཕན་ཕྱི་, 偏吉乡), Barma Township (བར་མ་, 帕玛乡), Qonkor Township (ཆོས་འཁོར་, 琼果乡), Rintor Township (རི་འཐོར་, 仁多乡), Yagra Township (ཡག་ར་, 亚热乡).

== Nyingchi ==
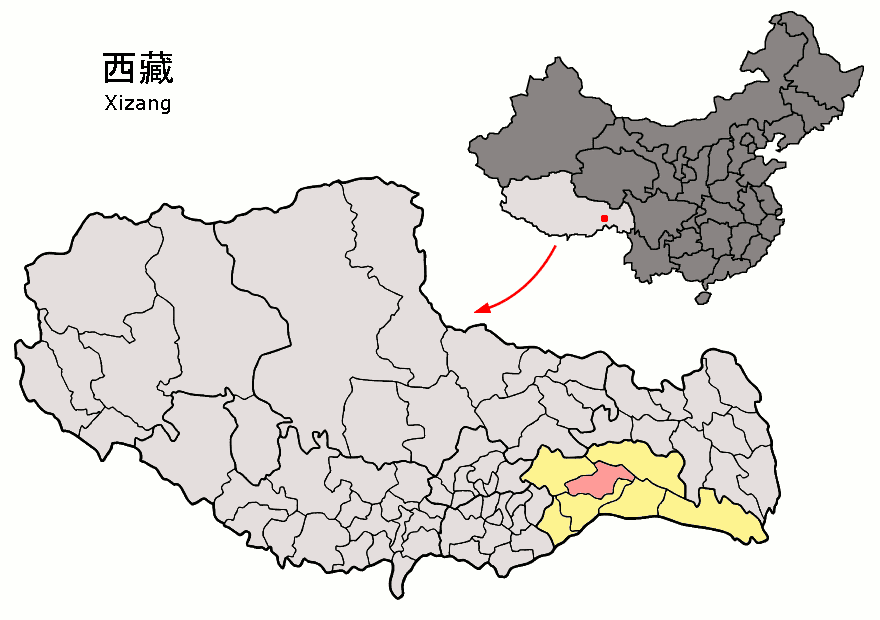
Location of Nyingchi (district in pink, rest of administrative area in yellow) in the Autonomous region

=== Bayi District ===
Towns

- Bayi Town (བྲག་ཡིབ་, 八一镇), Nyingchi Town (ཉིང་ཁྲི་, 林芝镇), Bêba Town (སྤྲེ་པ་, 百巴镇), Lunang Town (ཀླུ་ནང་, 鲁朗镇)

Townships

- Güncang Township (དགུན་ཚང་, 更章门巴民族乡), Puqu Township (བུ་ཆུ་, 布久乡), Mairi Township (སྨད་རི་, 米瑞乡).

=== Bomê County ===
Towns

- Zhamo Town (སྤྲ་རྨོག་, 扎木镇), Chumdo Town (ཆུ་མདོ་, 倾多镇), Sumzom Town (གསུམ་འཛོམས་, 松宗镇)

Townships

- Gu Township (དགུ་ཤང་, 古乡), Shulmo Township (ཤུལ་མོ་, 玉许乡), Dorjé Township (རྡོ་རྗེ་, 多吉乡), Kangyul Township (ཁང་ཡུལ་, 康玉乡), Yupuk Township (གཡུ་ཕུག་, 玉普乡), Yi'ong Township (ཡིད་འོང་, 易贡乡), Paggai Township (བྲག་སྐས་, 八盖乡).

=== Gongbo'gyamda County ===
Towns

- Gongbo'gyamda Town (ཀོང་པོ་རྒྱ་མདའ་, 工布江达镇), Chimda Town (སྥྱི་མདའ་, 金达镇), Zhoka Town (ཞོ་ཁ་, 巴河镇)

Townships

- Tsongo Township (མཚོ་འགོ་, 错高乡), Drug la Township (འབྲུག་ལ་, 朱拉乡), Drongsar Township (གྲོང་གསར་, 仲莎乡), Gyamda Township (རྒྱ་མདའ་, 江达乡), Nyangpo Township (ཉང་པོ་, 娘蒲乡), Gyashing Township (རྒྱ་ཤིང་, 加兴乡).

=== Mainling County ===
Towns

- Mainling Town (སྨན་གླིང་, 米林镇), Orong Town (ཨོ་རོང་, 卧龙镇), Pé Town (ཕད་, 派镇)

Townships

- Tamnyen Township (གཏམ་སྙན་, 丹娘乡), Naiyü Township (གནས་ཡུལ་, 南伊珞巴族乡), Chanak Township (ཆ་ནག་, 羌纳乡), Nelung Township (གནས་ལུང་, 里龙乡), Tashi Rabten Township (བཀྲིས་རབ་བརྟན་, 扎西绕登乡).

=== Mêdog County ===
- Metok Town (མེ་ཏོག་, 墨脱镇)

Townships

- Drepung Township (འབྲས་སྤུངས་, 背崩乡), Dezhing Township (བདེ་ཞིང་, 德兴乡), Takmo Township (སྟག་མོ་, 达木珞巴族乡), Bangxing Township (སྤང་ཞིང་, 旁辛乡), Jarasa Township (བྱ་ར་ས་, 加热萨乡), Ganden Township (དགའ་ལྡན་, 甘登乡), Gutang Township (དགུ་ཐང་, 格当乡).

=== Nang County ===
Towns

- Nang Town (སྣང་, 朗镇), Dromda Town (སྒྲོམ་མདའ་, 仲达镇), Dungkar Town (དུང་དཀར་, 洞嘎镇)

Townships

- Kyemtong Township (སྐྱེམས་སྟོང་, 金东乡), Latok Township (ལ་ཐོག་, 拉多乡), Dem Township (ལྡེམ་, 登木乡).

=== Zayü County ===
Towns

- Drowagön Town (འགྲོ་བ་དགོན་, 竹瓦根镇), Shangzayü Town (རྫ་ཡུལ་རོང་སྟོད་, 上察隅镇), Xiazayü Town (རྫ་ཡུལ་རོང་སྨད་, 下察隅镇).

Townships

- Goyü Township (མགོ་ཡུལ་, 古玉乡), Gola Township (མགོ་ལག་, 古拉乡), Cawarong Township (ཚ་བ་རོང་, 察瓦龙乡).

== Shannan (Lhoka) ==
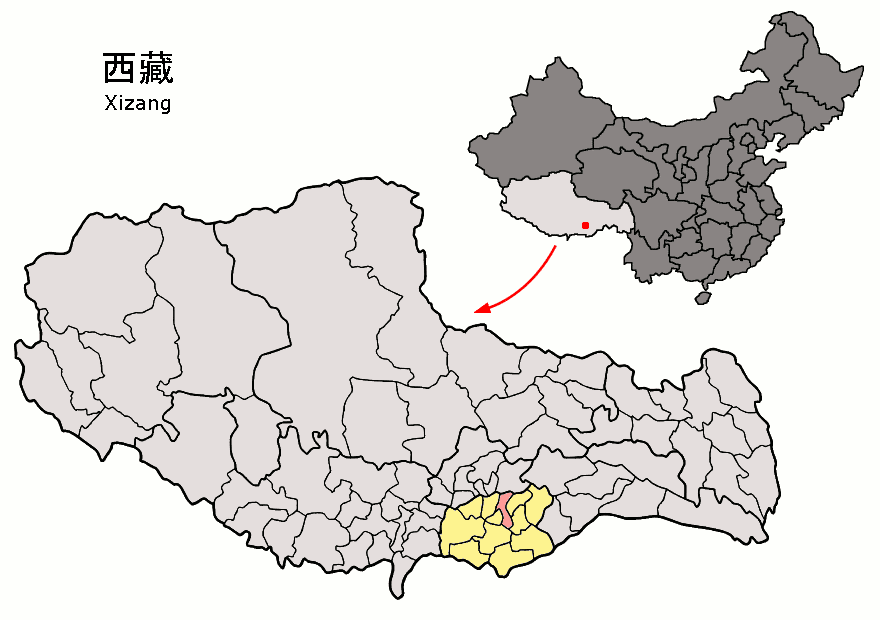
Location of Shannan (district in pink, rest of administrative area in yellow) in the Autonomous region

=== Nêdong District ===
Towns

- Tsetang (རྩེ་ཐང་, 泽当镇), Thradrug (ཁྲ་འབྲུག་, 昌珠镇)

Townships

- Pozhang Township (པོ་བྲང་, 颇章乡), Kerpa Township (སྐར་པ་, 结巴乡), Dopozhang Township (རྡོ་ཕོ་བྲང་, 多颇章乡), Sodruk Township (སོ་དྲུག་, 索珠乡), Yadoi Township (ཡ་སྟོད་, 亚堆乡)

=== Comai County ===
Towns

- Comai Town (མཚོ་སམད་, 措美镇), Drigu Town (གྲི་གུ་, 哲古镇)

Townships

- Naixi Township (གནས་བཞི་, 乃西乡), Godü Township (སྒོ་བསྡུས་, 古堆乡)

=== Cona County ===
Towns

- Cona Town (མཚོ་སྣ་, 错那镇)

Townships

- Lai Township (སླས་, 勒门巴族乡), Kongri Township (ཀོང་རི་, 贡日门巴族乡), Gyiba Township (སྐྱིད་པ་, 吉巴门巴族乡), Marmang Township (མར་མང་, 麻玛门巴族乡), Kaqu Township (ཁ་ཆུ་, 库局乡), Qudromo Township (ཆུ་དྲོ་མོ་, 曲卓木乡), Lampug Township (ལམ་ཕུག་, 浪坡乡), Jorra Township (སྦྱོར་ར་, 觉拉乡), Kardak Township (མཁར་ལྟག་, 卡达乡)

=== Gonggar County ===
Towns

- Kyishong Town (སྐྱིད་གཤོངས་, 吉雄镇), Göntö Town (དགོན་སྟོད་, 岗堆镇), Gyadrukling Town (རྒྱ་དྲུག་གླིང་, 甲竹林镇), Qangtang Town (བྱང་ཐང་, 江塘镇), Chede Zhöl Town (ལྕེ་བདེ་ཞོལ་, 杰德秀镇)

Township

- Namgyel Zhöl Township (རྣམ་རྒྱལ་ཞོལ་, 朗杰学乡), Chênggo Township (འཕྲེང་གོ་, 昌果乡), Dongra Township (སྟོང་རྭ་ 东拉乡)

=== Gyaca County ===
Towns

- Gyaca Town (རྒྱ་ཚ་, 加查镇), Ngarrab Town (མངར་རབ་, 安绕镇)

Townships

- Lhasöl Township (ལྷ་གསོལ་, 拉绥乡), Chêju Township (ཆེས་བཅུ་, 崔久乡), Ba Township (སྦྲ་, 坝乡), Lingda Township (གླིང་མདའ་, 冷达乡), Lholing Township (ལྷོ་གླིང་, 洛林乡)

=== Lhozhag County ===
Towns

- Lhozhag Town (ལྷོ་བྲག་, 洛扎镇), Lhakang Town (ལྷ་ཁང་, 拉康镇)

Townships

- Sengge Township (སེང་གེ་, 生格乡), Benpa Township (བེན་པ་, 边巴乡), Zara Township (རྫ་ར་, 扎日乡), Se Township (སྲས་, 色乡), La'gyab Township (ལ་རྒྱབ་, 拉郊乡)

=== Lhünzê County ===
Towns

- Lhünzê Town (ལྷུན་རྩེ་, 隆子镇), Ritang Town (རི་ཐང་, 日当镇)

Townships

- Jayül Township (བྱ་ཡུལ་, 加玉乡), Nyaimai Township (གཉལ་སྨད་, 列麦乡), Rirong Township (རི་རོང་, 热荣乡), Sangngagqoiling Township (གསང་སྔགས་ཆོས་གླིང་, 三安曲林乡), Drönpa Township (སྒྲོན་པ་, 准巴乡), Doyü Township (མདོ་ཡུལ་, 斗玉珞巴族乡), Zhölsar Township (ཞོལ་གསར་, 雪萨乡), Zara Township (རྫ་ར་, 扎日乡), Yümai Township (ཡུལ་སྨད་, 玉麦乡)

=== Nagarzê County ===
Towns

- Nagarzê Town (སྣ་དཀར་རྩེ་, 浪卡子), Daglung Town (སྟག་ལུང་, 打隆镇)

Townships

- Puma Jangtang Township (ཕུ་མ་བྱང་ཐང་, 普玛江塘乡), Doqoi Township (མདོ་ཆོས་, 多却乡), Karlung Township (མཁར་ལུང་, 卡龙乡), Ngardrak Township (མངར་བྲག་, 阿扎乡), Lhülpozhöl Township (ལྷུན་པོ་ཞོལ་, 工布学乡), Karrêg Township (ཁ་དབྲག་, 卡热乡), Baidi Township (དབལ་དི་, 白地乡), Chamda Township (གྲམ་མདའ་, 张达乡)

=== Qonggyai County ===
Qonggyai Town (འཕྱོངས་རྒྱས་, 琼结镇)

Townships

- Lhayül Township (ལྷ་ཡུལ་, 拉玉乡), Sharsü Township (ཤར་བསུས་, 下水乡), Gyemen Township (རྒྱས་སྨན་, 加麻乡)

=== Qusum County ===
Towns

- Qusum Town (ཆུ་གསུམ་, 曲松), Lababsa Town (ལ་བབས་ས་, 罗布沙镇)

Townships

- Qundo'gyang Township (ཆུ་མདོ་རྒྱང་, 邱多江乡), Tözik Township (སྟོད་གཟིགས་, 堆随乡), Shakjang Township (ཤག་བྱང་, 下江乡)

=== Sangri County ===
Sangri Town (ཟངས་རི་, 桑日)

Townships

- Zingqi Township (རྫིང་ཕྱི་, 增期乡), Bötö Township (འབོད་ཐོས་, 白堆乡), Rong Township (རོང་, 绒乡)

=== Zhanang County ===
Towns

- Dratang Town (གྲ་ཐང་, 扎塘镇), Samye Town (བསམ་ཡས་, 桑耶镇)

Townships

- Ngadra Township (ལྔ་གྲ་, 阿扎乡), Drachi Township (གྲ་ཕྱི་, 扎其乡), Gyiru Township (དཀྱིལ་རུ་, 吉汝乡)

== Nagqu ==
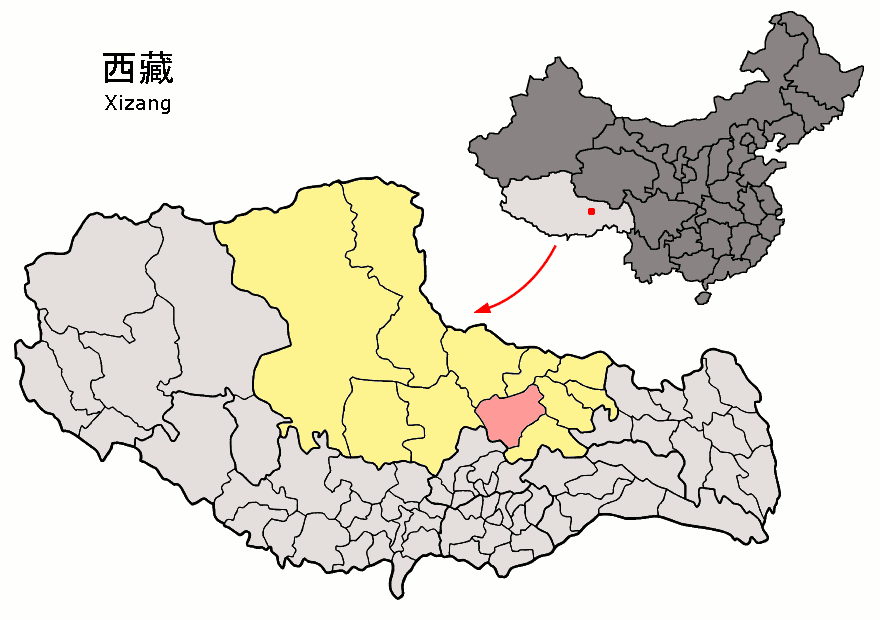
Location of Nagqu (district in pink, rest of administrative area in yellow) in the Autonomous region

=== Seni District ===
Towns

- Nagqu Town (ནག་ཆུ་, 那曲镇), Lhomar Town (ལྷོ་མ་, 罗玛镇), Golug Town (ཀོ་ལུང་, 古露镇)

Townships

- Shamong Township (ཤ་མོང་, 香茂乡), Yöchak Township (ཡོས་ཆགས་, 油恰乡), Namarche Township (ན་དམར་ཆེ་, 那么切乡), Kormang Township (འཁོར་མང་, 孔玛乡), Taksar Township (སྟག་གསར་, 达萨乡), Lumé Township (ལུ་སྨད་, 劳麦乡), Serzhong Township (གསེར་གཞོང་, 色雄乡), Nyima Township (ཉི་མ་, 尼玛乡), Daqên Township (སྟར་ཆེན་, 达前乡).

=== Amdo County ===
Towns

- Zharen Town (ཁྲ་རིང་, 扎仁镇), Yanshiping Town (ཡན་ཤིས་ཕིན་, 雁石坪镇), Qangma Town (བྱང་མ་, 强玛镇), Pana Town (བྲག་ནག་, 帕那镇)

Townships

- Cuoma Township (མཚོ་དམར་, 措玛乡), Dardü Township (དར་མདུད་, 滩堆乡), Sibnak Chenchungo Township (སྲིབ་ནག་ཆེན་ཆུ་མགོ་, 扎曲乡), Gangnyi Township (སྐང་གཉིས་, 岗尼乡), Marchu Township (དམར་ཆུ་, 玛曲乡), Sewu Township (སེའུ་, 色务乡), Marrong Township (དམར་རོང་, 玛荣乡), Töma Township (སྟོད་མ་, 多玛乡), Bangmer Township (སྦང་མེར་, 帮麦乡).

=== Baingoin County ===
Towns

- Phukpa Town (ཕུག་པ་, 普保镇), Bella Town (བལ་ལ་, 北拉镇), Jakhyung Town (བྱ་ཁྱུང་, 佳琼镇), Dechen Town (བདེ་ཆེན་, 德庆镇)

Townships

- Machen Township (རྨ་ཆེན་, 马前乡), Mentang Township (མན་ཐང་རགས་རྩེག་, 门当乡), Poche Township (སྤོ་ཆེ་, 保吉乡), Qinglung Township (ཕྱིང་ལུང་, 青龙乡), Shikhyer Township (ཤི་འཁྱེར་, 新吉乡), Nyima Township (ཉི་མ་, 尼玛乡).

=== Baqên County ===
Towns

- Lhashé Town (ལྷ་ཤེས་, 拉西镇), Ya'nga Town (ཡ་ང་, 雅安镇), Dzasib Town (རྫ་སྲིབ་, 杂色镇)

Townships

- Mamta Township (མམ་ཐ་, 江绵乡), Gangchen Township (གངས་ཆེན་, 岗切乡), Baqên Township (སྦྲ་ཆེན་, 巴青乡), Arshok Township (ཨར་ཤོག་, 阿秀乡), Marru Township (དམར་རུ་, 玛如乡), Bönta Township (བོན་མཐའ་, 本塔乡), Gangri Township (སྒང་རི་, 贡日乡).

=== Biru County ===
Towns

- Biru Town (འབྲི་རུ་, 比如镇), Shachu Town (ཤག་ཆུ་, 夏曲镇)

Townships

- Benkar Township (བན་དཀར་, 白嘎乡), Yangshok Township (གཡང་ཤོག་, 羊秀乡), Shamchu Township (གཤམ་ཆུ་, 香曲乡), Dawatang Township (ལྟག་ཐང་, 达塘乡), Lenchu Township (རླན་ཆུ་, 良曲乡), Tsachu Township (ཚྭ་ཆུ་, 茶曲乡), Zala Township (རྩྭ་ལ་, 扎拉乡), Qagzê Township (ཆགས་རྩེ་, 恰则乡).

=== Lhari County ===
Towns

- Arza Town (ཨར་རྩ་, 阿扎镇), Lhari Town (ལྷ་རི་, 嘉黎镇)

Townships

- Kochung Township (ཀོ་ཆུང་, 鸽群乡), Dzabbel Township (རྫབ་འབེལ་, 藏比乡), Drongyül Township (གྲོང་ཡུལ་, 忠玉乡), Codoi Township (ཚོ་སྟོད་, 措多乡), Tsora Township (མཚོ་རྭ་, 措拉乡), Lingti Township (གླིང་མཐིལ་, 林堤乡), Xarma Township (ཤར་མ་, 夏玛乡), Rongtö Township (རོང་སྟོད་, 绒多乡).

=== Nyainrong County ===
- Nyainrong Town (གཉན་རོང་, 聂荣)

Townships

- Nyima Township (ཉི་མ་, 尼玛乡), Chadam Township (ཁྲ་འདམ་, 查当乡), Damshung Township (འདམ་གཤུང་, 当木江乡), Yongchu Township (ཡོང་ཆུ་, 永曲乡), Sokzhung Township (སོག་གཞུང་, 索雄乡), Bezhung Township (བེ་གཞུང་, 白雄乡), Trolung Township (ཁྲོ་ལུང་, 桑荣乡), Shakchu Township (ཤག་ཆུ་, 下曲乡), Serchen Township (གསེར་ཆེན་, 色庆乡).

=== Nyima County ===
- Nyima Town (ཉི་མ་, 尼玛镇)

Townships

- Ombu Township (ཨོམ་བུ་, 文布乡), Drongtsang Township (གྲོང་ཚང་, 中仓乡), Drowa Township (གྲོ་བ་, 卓瓦乡), Dro'nyin Township (འགྲོ་ཉིན་, 卓尼乡), Kyelwa Township (སྐྱེལ་བ་, 吉瓦乡), Gyagok Township (རྒྱ་སྒོག་, 甲谷乡), Aso Township (ཨ་གསོ་, 阿索乡), Ngochu Township (སྔོ་ཆུ་, 俄久乡), Rongma Township (རོང་མ་, 荣玛乡), Targo Township (བསྟར་སྒོ་, 达果乡), Sin'ya Township (སྲིན་ཡ་, 申亚乡), Latö Township (ལ་སྟོད་, 来多乡), Kyungtsang Township (སྐྱུང་ཚང་, 军仓乡).

=== Sog County ===
Towns

- Yakla Town (གཡག་ལ་, 亚拉镇), Rongpo Town (རོང་པོ་, 荣布镇)

Townships

- Drogta Township (དབྲོག་རྟ་, 若达乡), Riwar Township (རི་དབར་, 热瓦乡), Sertam Township (གསེར་ཊམ་, 西昌乡), Karmo Township (དཀར་མོ་, 嘎木乡), Thrido Township (ཁྲི་རྡོ་, 赤多乡), Garmé Township (སྒར་སྨད་, 嘎美乡), Gyälchen Township (རྒྱལ་ཆེན་, 加勒乡), Chakda Township (ལྕགས་མདའ་, 江达乡).

=== Shuanghu (Conyi) County ===
- Codrel Lhoma Town (ཚོ་འབྲེལ་ལྷོ་མ་, 措折罗玛镇)

Townships

- Tsodrel Jangma Township (ཚོ་སྦྲེལ་བྱང་མ་, 措折羌玛乡), Zhide Township (ཞི་བདེ་, 协德乡), Barling Township (བར་གླིང་, 巴岭乡), Domar Township (རྡོ་དམར་, 多玛乡), Yachu Township (ཡ་ཆུ་, 雅曲乡), Garco Township (དཀར་མཚོ་, 嘎措乡).

=== Xainza County ===
Towns

- Xainza Town (ཤན་རྩ་, 申扎镇), Xiongmei Town (གཞུང་སྨད་, 雄梅镇)

Townships

- Mar'yo Township (མར་ཡོ་, 马跃乡), Mepa Township (སྨད་པ་, 买巴乡), Tarma Township (ཐར་མ་, 塔尔玛乡), Zhago Township (བཞ་སྒོ་, 下过乡), Khyak Township (འཁྱག་, 恰乡), Patra Township (པ་བཀྲ་, 巴扎乡).

== Ngari Prefecture ==
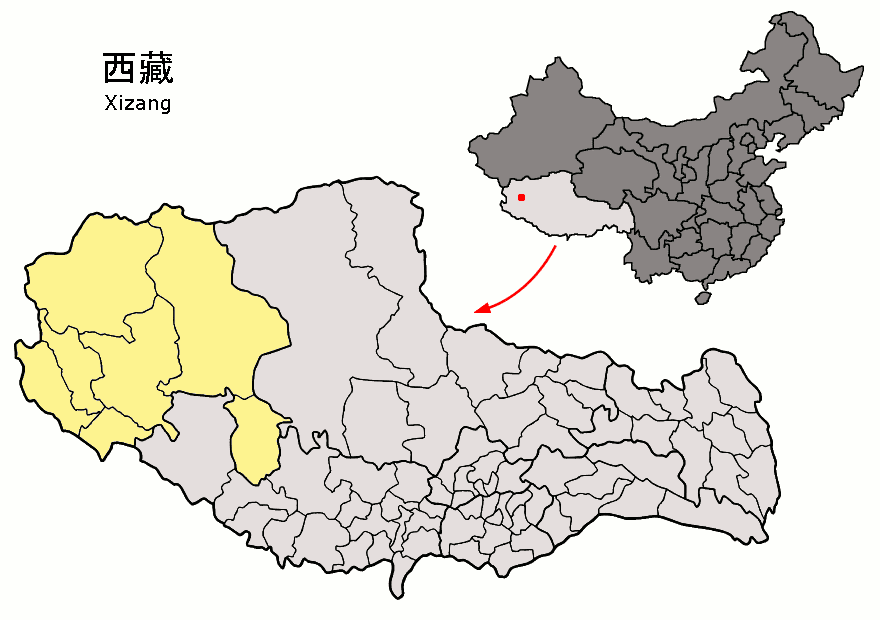
Location of Ngari Prefecture (administrative area in yellow) in the Autonomous region

=== Gar County ===
The only town is Sênggêzangbo (Shiquanhe) Town (སེང་གེ་ཁ་འབབ་, 狮泉河镇)

Townships

- Günsa Township (ཀུན་ས་, 昆莎乡), Moincêr Township (མོནམཚེར་, 门士乡), Zhaxigang Township (བཀྲ་ཤིས་སྒང་, 扎西岗乡) and Zoco Township (རྒོད་ཚང་, 左左乡).

=== Burang County ===
The only town is Burang Town (སྤུ་ཧྲེང་, 普兰镇)

Townships

- Hor Township (ཧོར་, 霍尔乡), Baga Township (བར་ག་, 巴嘎乡).

=== Coqên County ===
The only town is Coqên Town (མཚོ་ཆེན་, 措勤镇)

Townships

- Chulho Township (ཆུ་ལྷོ་, 曲洛乡), Gyangrang Township (རྐྱང་ཧྲེང་, 江让乡), Dawaxung Township (ཟླ་གཞུང་, 达雄乡), Cêri Township (མཚེ་རི་, 磁石乡).

=== Gê'gyai County ===
The only town is Gê'gyai Town (དགེ་རྒྱས་, 革吉镇)

Townships

- Zhungpa Township (གཞུང་པ་, 雄巴乡), Yagra Township (ཡག་རྭ་, 亚热乡), Yanhu Township (ཚྭ་མཚོ་, 盐湖乡), Wönpo tamzang Township (བོན་པོ་གཏམ་བཟང་, 文布当桑乡).

=== Gêrzê County ===
The only town is Gêrzê Town (སྒེར་རྩེ་, 改则镇)

Townships

- Chabug Township (བྲག་པོ་, 察布乡), Dongco Township (སྟོང་མཚོ་, 洞措乡), Gomo Township (ཁྲ་མདོངས་, 古姆乡), Marmê Township (མར་མེ་, 麻米乡), Oma Township (འོ་མ་, 物玛乡) and Shenchen Township (ཤན་ཆན་, 先遣乡).

=== Rutog County ===
The only town is Rutog Town (རུ་ཐོག་, 日土镇)

Townships

- Tungru Township (དུང་རུ་, 东汝乡), Domar Township (རྡོ་དམར་, 多玛乡), Risong Township (རུ་ཟུང་, 日松乡), Rabang Township (ར་སྤང་, 热帮乡).

=== Zanda County ===
The only town is Thoding Town (མཐོ་ལྡིང་, 托林镇)

Townships

- Daba Township (མདའ་འབབ་, 达巴乡), Diyag Township (ཏི་ཡག་, 底雅乡), Chumuti Township (ཆུ་མུ་ཏི་, 曲松乡), Dzarong Township (རྫ་རོང་, 萨让乡), Qangzê Township (བྱང་རྩེ་, 香孜乡), Tsosib Sumkyil Township (ཚོ་སྲིབ་གསུམ་དཀྱིལ་, 楚鲁松杰乡).
