= Qusum =

Qusum may refer to:

- Qusum County, county in Tibet
- Qusum Town, town in Tibet
