= Baqen =

Baqen may refer to:

- Baqên County, county in Tibet
- Baqên Town, town in Tibet
