= Nyamo =

Nyamo may refer to:

- Nyamo Township, Tibet
- Nyamo Namo from Love Hina
- Minamo Kurosawa from Azumanga Daioh
- Nyamo from Lucky Star
