= Tibet Huayu Mining =

Chinese mining and metals company

Tibet Huayu Mining Co., Ltd. 华钰矿业股份有限公司
- Type: Public company
- Traded as: SSE: 601020
- Industry: Mining, non-ferrous metals
- Founded: 2002; 24 years ago
- Headquarters: Lhasa, China
- Key people: Chairman: Zhu Shijie
- Products: Lead, zinc, copper, gold, silver, antimony
- Revenue: RMB 2.71 billion (2023)
- Number of employees: Approx. 360

Tibet Huayu Mining Co., Ltd. (Chinese: 华钰矿业) is a Chinese publicly traded mining company headquartered in Lhasa, Tibet. Established in 2002, the company engages in the exploration, mining, processing, and trading of non-ferrous metals including lead, zinc, copper, antimony, gold, and silver. It operates both domestic and overseas mining projects and is listed on the Shanghai Stock Exchange under stock code SSE: 601020.

== Corporate affairs ==
The company is majority privately owned but operates under close regulatory supervision due to its presence in strategic regions. It has three branch offices, eight subsidiaries, and two international joint ventures. Tibet Huayu has been consistently recognized as one of the "Top 20 Private Employers" in the Tibet Autonomous Region.

== History ==
Tibet Huayu Mining was founded in 2002 and has grown into a diversified mining company. It was listed on the Shanghai Stock Exchange on March 16, 2016. In December 2017, the company acquired a 50% stake in TALCO Gold, Tajikistan's largest state-owned mining company, and later expanded its international portfolio to include a 70% stake in Tigray Resources in Ethiopia and a 40% stake in Guizhou Asia-Pacific Mining Co., Ltd.

== Operations ==
=== Domestic mining ===
- Zangzhuoma Lead-Zinc Mine (Tibet): Located in Qusum County, Shannan Prefecture, this is the company's flagship operation. The mine has approved capacities of 11,800 tons of lead concentrate and 26,300 tons of zinc concentrate annually.
- Asia-Pacific Mining Co. (Guizhou): Tibet Huayu holds a 40% equity stake in this company, which owns and operates polymetallic resources in southwestern China.

=== International mining ===
- TALCO Gold (Tajikistan): In partnership with Tajikistan's state-owned TALCO, Tibet Huayu owns a 50% stake in this antimony-gold project. Trial production began in 2020.
- Tigray Resources (Ethiopia): Tibet Huayu holds a 70% interest in this project. It targets copper and gold resources in northern Ethiopia, though its operations have been intermittently impacted by regional instability.
