= Chengnan =

Chengnan (usually a romanisation of Chinese: 城南; lit. 'south of the city') may refer to:

- Chengnan, Shaoyang, subdistrict of Daxiang District, Shaoyang City, Hunan, China
- Chengnan Subdistrict, Shigatse, Tibet Autonomous Region, China
- Chengnan Subdistrict, Chongqing, subdistrict of Qianjiang District, Chongqing, China
- Chengnan Subdistrict Shantou, subdistrict of Chaoyang District, Shantou, Guangdong, China
- The southern area of the walled city of Nanjing
