= Maiyü =

Coordinates: 30°12′N 97°26′E

Maiyü (སྨད་ཡུལ་, 美玉乡) is a township in Zogang County the Tibet Autonomous Region of China.

== See also ==
- List of township-level divisions of the Tibet Autonomous Region
