= Bênxung Township =

Benxung
- Township
- Location within Tibet
- Coordinates: 29°19′12″N 89°03′08″E
- Country: People's Republic of China
- Region: Tibet
- Prefecture: Shigatse
- District: Samzhubzê

Area
  - Total: 230 km^{2} (89 sq mi)

Population (2010)
  - Total: 4,106
  - Major Nationalities: Tibetan
  - Regional dialect: Tibetan language
- Time zone: UTC+8 (China Standard)

Benxung is a village and township of Samzhubzê District (Shigatse City), in the Tibet Autonomous Region of China. At the time of the 2010 census, the township had a population of 4,106 and an area of 230 square kilometres (89 sq mi).As of 2013, it had 10 villages under its administration.
