= Goibo =

Goibo རྒོད་པོ་ Göpo
- Location within Tibet
- Coordinates: 30°11′N 98°52′E
- Country: China
- Region: Tibet

Population
  - Total
  - Major Nationalities: Tibetan
  - Regional dialect: Tibetan language
- Time zone: +8

Goibo is a township in Markam County in the Tibet Autonomous Region of China.

== See also ==
- List of township-level divisions of the Tibet Autonomous Region
