= Shigatse Peace Airport =

Airport in Tibet, China

Rikaze Peace Airport 日喀则和平机场 གཞིས་ཀ་རྩེ་ཞི་བདེ་གནམ་གྲུ་ཐང་།
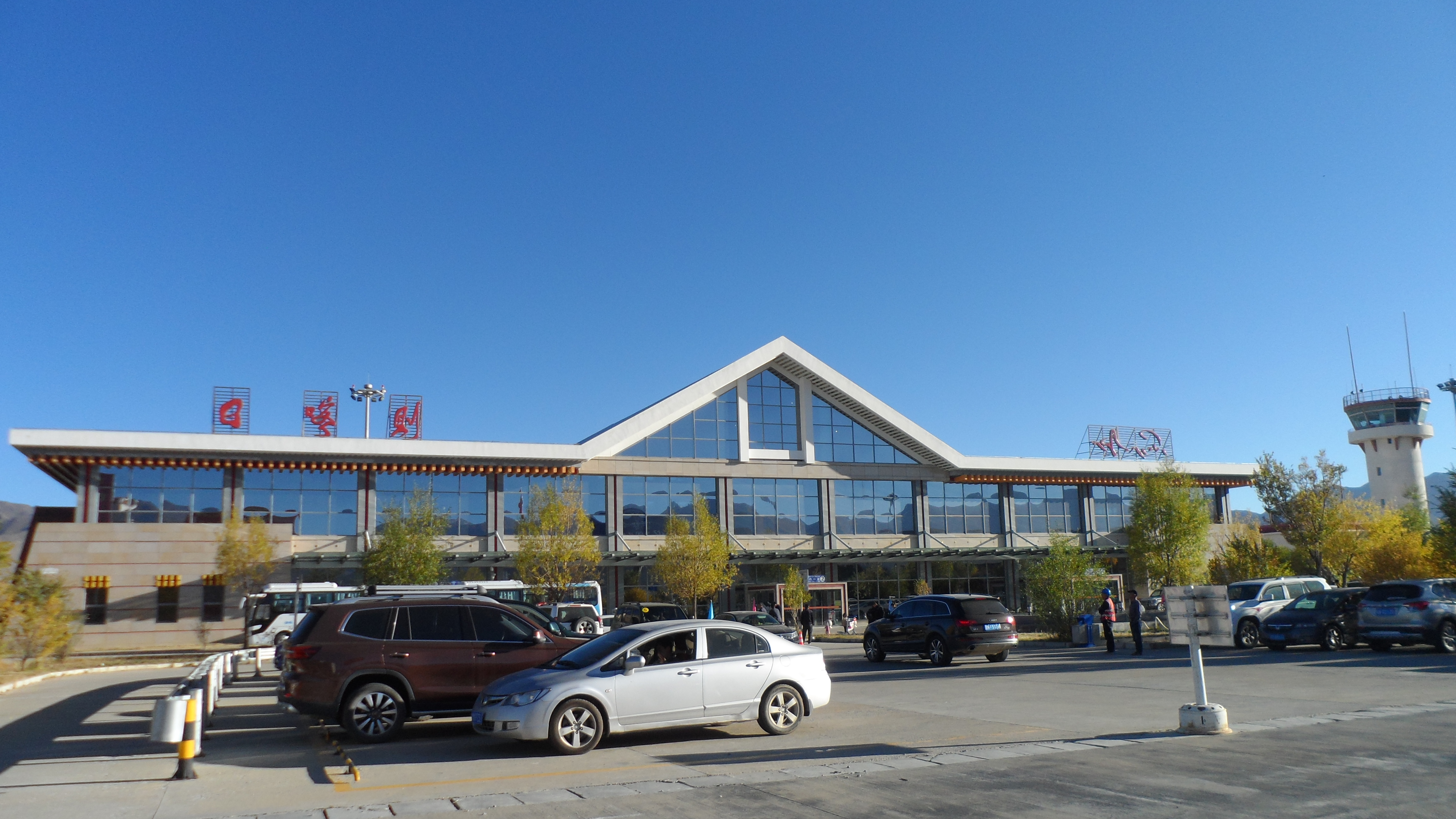
- Terminal building
- IATA: RKZ; ICAO: ZURK

Summary
- Airport type: Public/Military
- Serves: Shigatse, Tibet A.R.
- Location: Jangdam, Samzhubzê District, Shigatse
- Opened: 30 October 2010; 16 years ago
- Built: 1973; 53 years ago
- Elevation AMSL: 3,782 m (12,408 ft)
- Coordinates: 29°21′06″N 89°18′25″E

Map
- Location of airport in Tibet RKZ (China)

Runways
Direction	Length		Surface
Direction	m	ft	Surface
09/27	5,000	16,404	Concrete
07/25	3,000	9,843	Concrete

Statistics (2021)
- Passengers: 144,870
- Aircraft movements: 1,804
- Cargo (metric tons): 528.9

Shigatse Peace Airport

Chinese name
- Simplified Chinese: 日喀则和平机场
- Traditional Chinese: 日喀則和平機場
Transcriptions
Standard Mandarin
- Hanyu Pinyin: Rìkāzé Hépíng Jīchǎng

Tibetan name
- Tibetan: གཞིས་ཀ་རྩེ་ཞི་བདེ་གནམ་གྲུ་ཐང་།
Transcriptions
- Wylie: gzhis ka rtse zhi bde gnam gru thang

Shigatse (Rikaze) Peace Airport (IATA: RKZ, ICAO: ZURK), Shigatse Heping Airport, or Shigatse Air Base, is a dual-use military and civilian airport serving Shigatse, the second largest city in Tibet Autonomous Region, China. It is located in Jangdam Township, approximately 43 kilometres (27 mi) from Shigatse. Situated at an elevation of 3,782 metres (12,408 ft), it is one of the highest airports in the world.

Construction of Shigatse Airport started in 1968 and was completed in 1973. It was solely for military use until 2010, when a 532 million yuan expansion was completed. On 30 October 2010, the airport was opened as the fifth civilian airport in Tibet.

Shigatse is also served by Shigatse Tingri Airport, opened 2022.

== Facilities ==
The airport has a 5,000-metre (16,000 ft) runway with a 60-metre (200 ft) asphalt overrun at each end. It is the longest public runway in the world, tied with Ulyanovsk Vostochny Airport in Russia. It also features a 4,500-square-metre (48,000 sq ft) terminal building. It is projected to handle 230,000 passengers and 1,150 tonnes (1,130 long tons; 1,270 short tons) of cargo annually by 2020.

Around 2017, a new runway of approximately 3,000 metres (9,840 ft) was constructed. Guizhou WZ-7 Soaring Dragon UAVs were seen hosted by this runway. The runway is located at the west end of its primary runway.

== Gallery ==
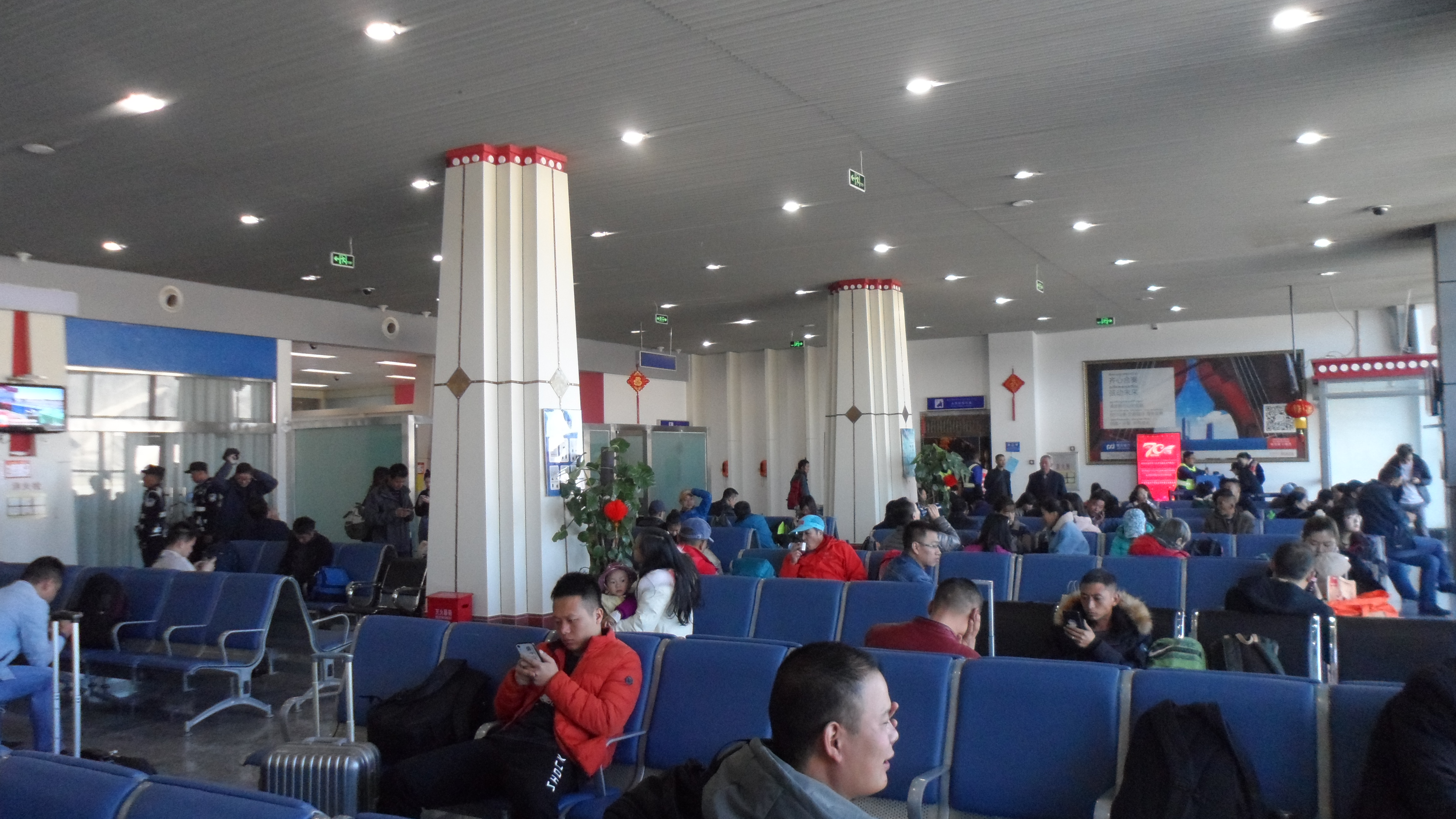
Inside the terminal

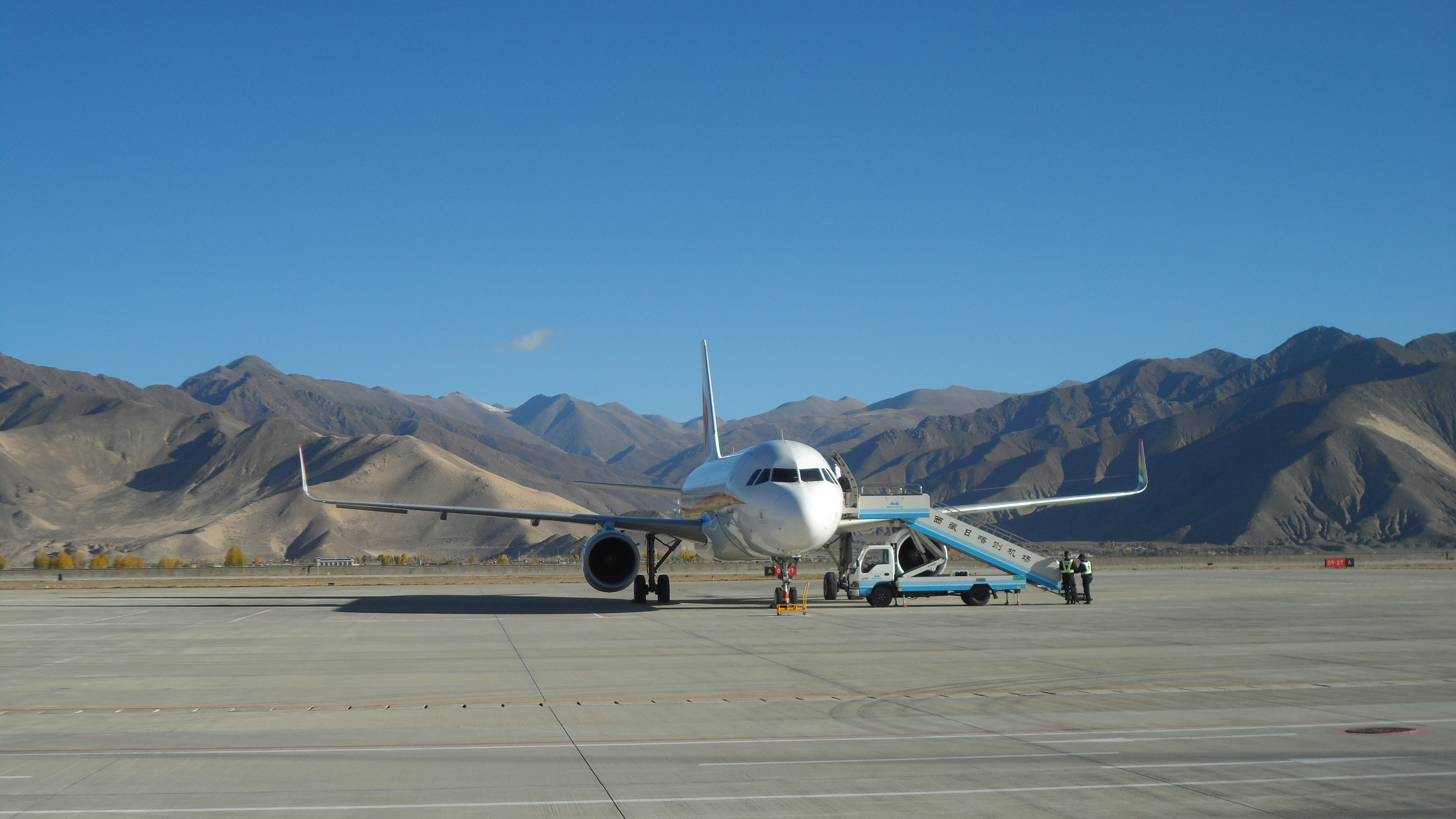
Airport taxiways

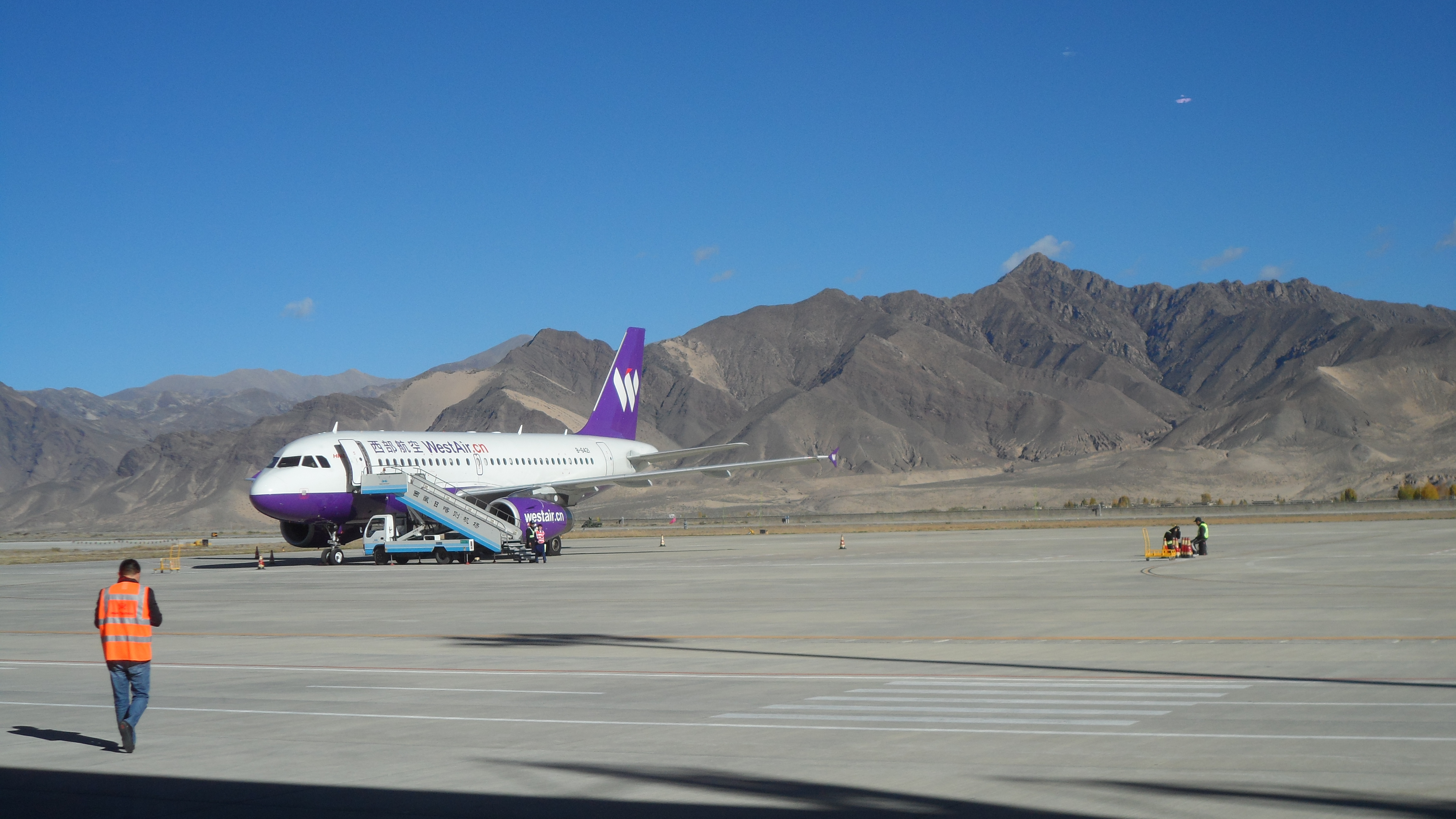
Airport taxiways

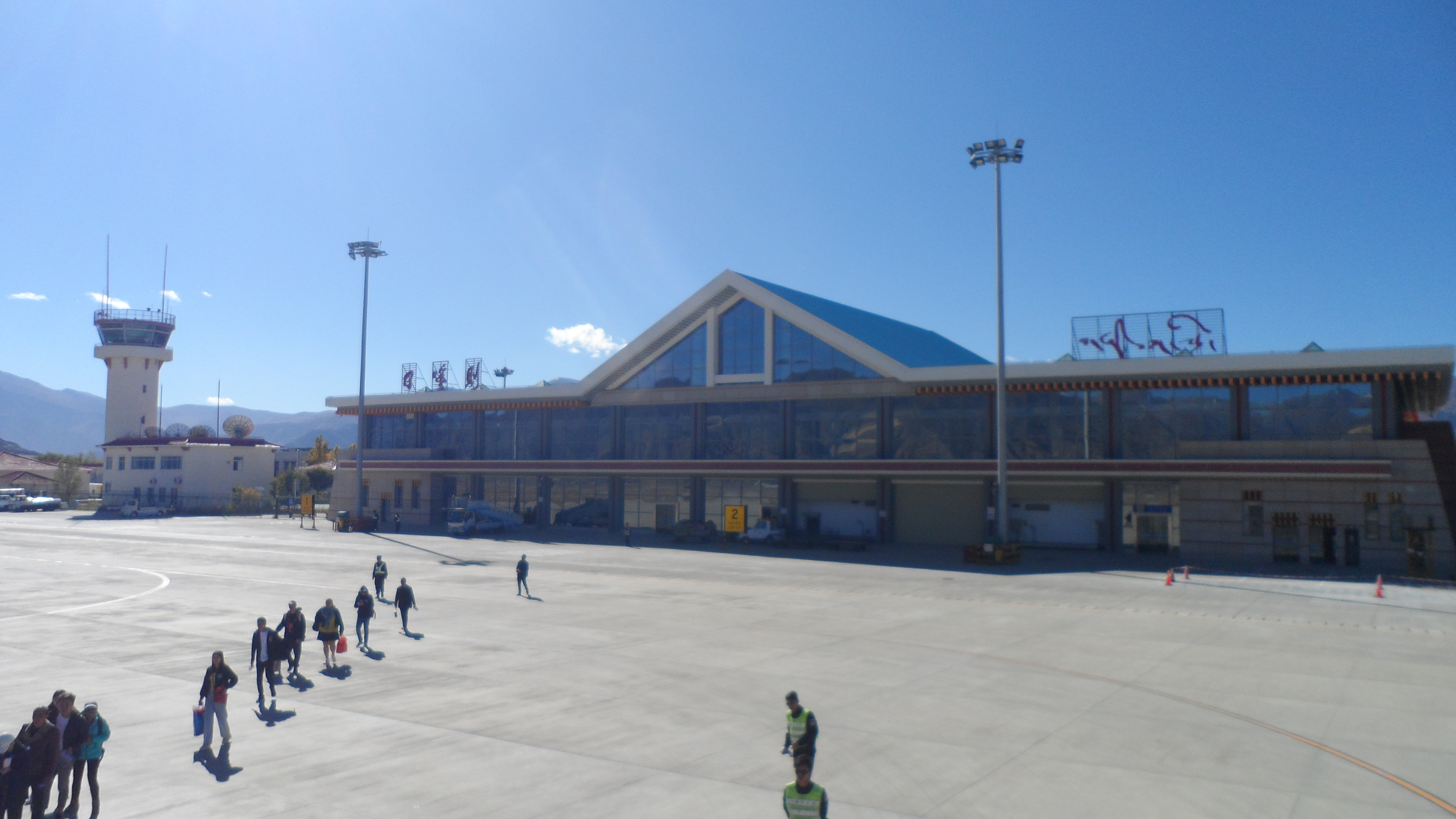
Airport terminal (a view from tarmac)

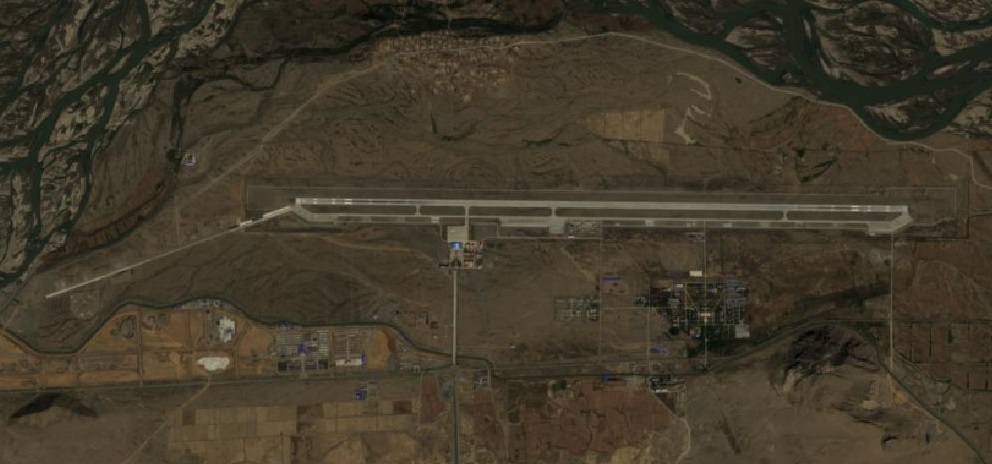
Satellite view of the airport (2017)

== Airlines and destinations ==
Airlines	Destinations
China Eastern Airlines	Xi'an
Xizang Airlines	Chengdu–Shuangliu, Shijiazhuang, Xining

== Map and location markers ==
1 Runway 1 (16,404ft)
2 Runway 2 (9,843ft)
3 Main terminal
4 Air traffic control tower

== See also ==
- List of airports in China
- List of the busiest airports in China
- List of People's Liberation Army Air Force airbases
