= Xobando =

Xobando ཤོ་པ་མདོ་ Shopado
- Location within Tibet
- Coordinates: 30°48′N 95°40′E
- Country: China
- Region: Tibet

Population
  - Total
  - Major Nationalities: Tibetan
  - Regional dialect: Tibetan language
- Time zone: +8

Xobando (ཤོ་པ་མདོ་, 硕督镇) is a town in the Chamdo, Tibet Autonomous Region of China.

== See also ==
- List of township-level divisions of the Tibet Autonomous Region
