= Chamoling =

Township in Tibet Autonomous Region of China

Coordinates: 31°22′N 96°22′E

Chamoling (Tibetan: ཁྲ་མོ་གླིང་, Chinese: 长毛岭; pinyin: Chángmáolǐng) is a township in Riwoqê County, Tibet Autonomous Region of China. It lies at an altitude of 4,651 metres (15,262 feet).

== See also ==
- List of township-level divisions of the Tibet Autonomous Region
