= Jangdam =

- Township
- Location within Tibet
- Coordinates: 29°20′14″N 89°14′38″E
- Country: China
- Region: Tibet
- Prefecture: Shigatse
- District: Samzhubzê

Area
  - Total: 304 km^{2} (117 sq mi)

Population (2010)
  - Total: 4,951
  - Major Nationalities: Tibetan
  - Regional dialect: Tibetan language
- Time zone: UTC+8 (China Standard)

Jangdam (Chinese: 江当乡) is a village and township of Samzhubzê District (Shigatse City), in the Tibet Autonomous Region of China. At the time of the 2010 census, the township had a population of 4,951 and an area of 304 square kilometres (117 sq mi). It is the location of the Shigatse Peace Airport serving the city. At that time, it had 15 villages under its administration.
