= Gyamcoxung Township =

Gyacoxung
- Township
- Location within Tibet
- Coordinates: 29°11′15″N 88°56′02″E
- Country: China
- Region: Tibet
- Prefecture: Shigatse
- District: Samzhubzê

Area
  - Total: 471 km^{2} (182 sq mi)

Population (2010)
  - Total: 11,946
  - Major Nationalities: Tibetan
  - Regional dialect: Tibetan language
- Time zone: UTC+8 (China Standard)

Gyacoxung (Tibetan: རྒྱ་མཚོ་གཞུང་; simplified Chinese: 甲措雄乡; traditional Chinese: 甲措雄鄉; pinyin: Jiǎcuòxióng Xiāng) is a township of Samzhubzê District (Shigatse City), in the Tibet Autonomous Region of China. At the time of the 2010 census, the township had a population of 11,946 and an area of 471 square kilometres (182 sq mi). Xigazê railway station is located here.

== Administrative divisions ==
Gyamcoxung Township is divided into 23 villages:

- Sima Village
- Zhandui Village
- Jiamudui Village
- Biza Village
- Sangalin Village
- Naolin Village
- Lianzhuo Village
- Qiangdui Village
- Congxiong Village
- Nujie Village
- Tajie Village
- Dina Village
- Shangqiangjiu Village
- Lian'a Village
- Xiaqiangjiu Village
- Qiongzi Village
- Takang Village
- Kadui Village
- Taba Village
- Gangcun Village
- Xialu Village
- Punu Village
- Puxia Village
