= Donggar Township =

Donggar
- Township
- Location within Tibet
- Coordinates: 29°21′38″N 88°50′05″E
- Country: Tibet
- Prefecture: Shigatse
- District: Samzhubzê

Area
  - Total: 428 km^{2} (165 sq mi)

Population (2010)
  - Total: 8,625
  - Major Nationalities: Tibetan
  - Regional dialect: Tibetan language
- Time zone: UTC+8 (Irkutsk Time)

Donggar is a village and township of Samzhubzê District (Shigatse City), in the Tibet Autonomous Region of China. At the time of the 2010 census, the township had a population of 8,625 and an area of 428 square kilometres (165 sq mi).As of 2013, it had 28 villages under its administration.
