= Qumig =

Qumig ཆུ་མིག་ · 曲美乡 Qumei
- Township
- Location within Tibet
- Coordinates (Qumig Township government): 29°08′36″N 88°43′34″E
- Country: People's Republic of China
- Autonomous region: Tibet
- Prefecture-level city: Shigatse
- District: Samzhubzê

Area
  - Total: 356 km^{2} (137 sq mi)

Population (2010)
  - Total: 5,998
  - Major Nationalities: Tibetan
  - Regional dialect: Tibetan language
- Time zone: UTC+8 (China Standard)

Qumig (Tibetan: ཆུ་མིག་), or Qumei Chinese: 曲美乡; pinyin: Qūměi Xiāng), is a village and township of Samzhubzê District (Shigatse City), in the Tibet Autonomous Region of China. At the time of the 2010 census, the township had a population of 5,998 and an area of 356 square kilometres (137 sq mi). As of 2019, it had 18 villages under its administration.
