= Chengbei Subdistrict, Shigatse =

Chengbei Subdistrict གྲོང་བྱང་དོན་གཅོད་ · 城北街道
- Subdistrict
- Location within Tibet
- Coordinates (Chengbei Subdistrict office): 29°16′32″N 88°53′07″E
- Country: People's Republic of China
- Autonomous region: Tibet
- Prefecture-level city: Shigatse
- District: Samzhubzê

Area
  - Total: 70 km^{2} (27 sq mi)
- Elevation: 3,841 m (12,602 ft)

Population (2010)
  - Total: 13,110
  - Major Nationalities: Tibetan
  - Regional dialect: Tibetan language
- Time zone: UTC+8 (China Standard)
- Postal code: 857000
- Area code: 0892

Chengbei Subdistrict (Chinese: 城北街道; pinyin: Chéngběi Jiēdào; lit. 'city north'; Tibetan: གྲོང་བྱང་དོན་གཅོད་, Wylie: grong byang don gcod) is a subdistrict and the seat of Shigatse City, Tibet Autonomous Region, People's Republic of China. At the time of the 2010 census, the subdistrict had a population of 13,110 and an area of 70 square kilometres (27 sq mi) as of 2010. As of 2019, it has five residential communities (社区) under its administration.
