= Samzhubzê, Xigazê =

Samzhubzê 桑珠孜区 • བསམ་འགྲུབ་རྩེ་ཆུས། Sangzhuzi, Samdruptse
- District
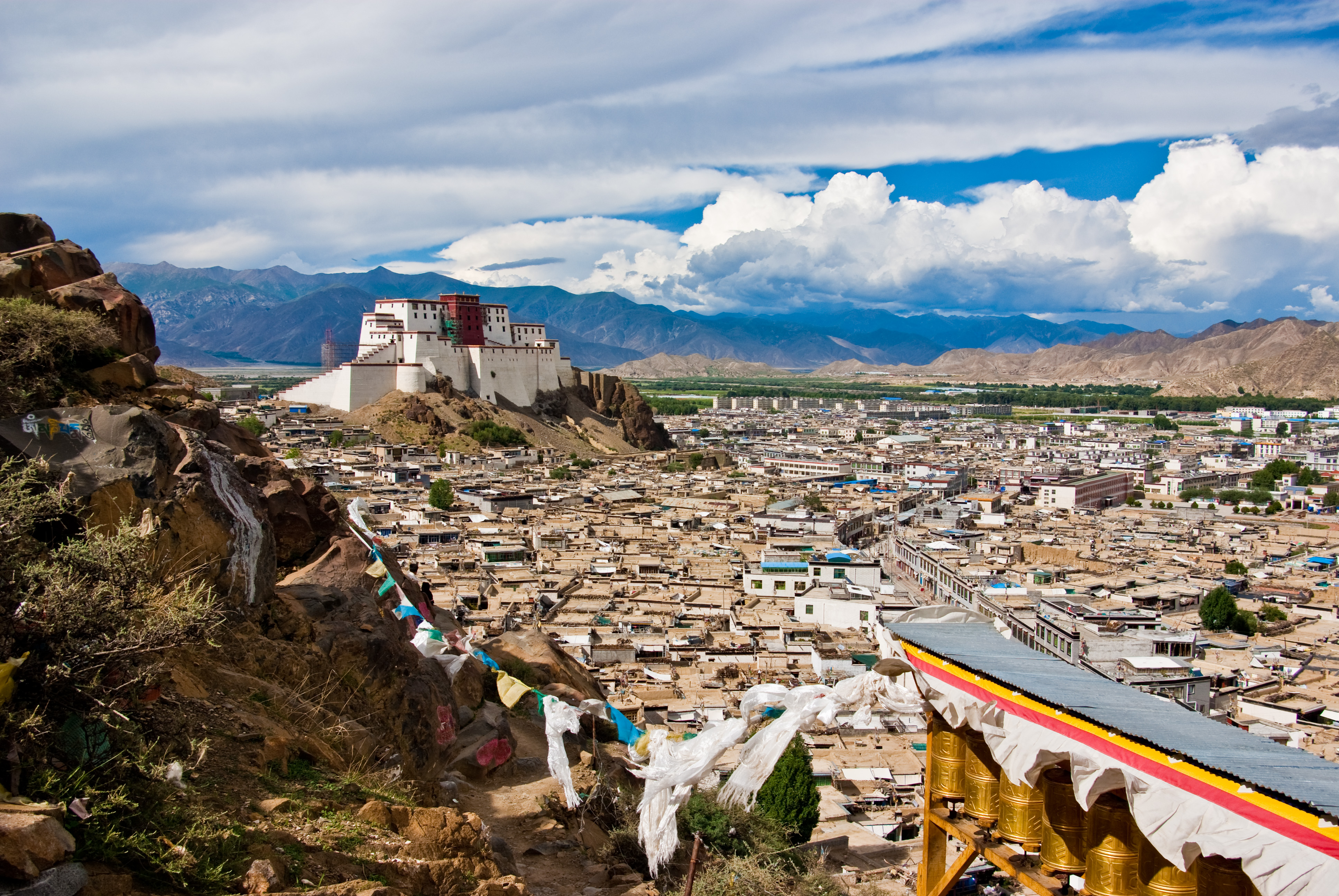
- Samzhubzê in 2009

- Location in Tibet Samzhubzê (China)
- Coordinates (Xigazê government): 29°16′01″N 88°52′48″E
- Country: China
- Autonomous region: Tibet
- Prefecture-level city: Xigazê
- District seat: Chengbei Subdistrict

Area
  - Total: 3,654.18 km^{2} (1,410.89 sq mi)
- Elevation: 3,836 m (12,585 ft)

Population (2020)
  - Total: 158,290
  - Density: 43.318/km^{2} (112.19/sq mi)
- Time zone: UTC+8 (CST)
- Postal code: 857000
- Area code: 0892
- Website: www.xzrkz.gov.cn

Samzhubzê, Xigazê

Chinese name
- Simplified Chinese: 桑珠孜区
- Traditional Chinese: 桑珠孜區
- Hanyu Pinyin: Sāngzhūzī Qū
- Postal: Samdruptse
Transcriptions
Standard Mandarin
- Hanyu Pinyin: Sāngzhūzī Qū

Tibetan name
- Tibetan: བསམ་འགྲུབ་རྩེ་ཆུས་
Transcriptions
- Wylie: bsam-'grub-rtse chus
- Tibetan Pinyin: Samzhubzê Qü
- Lhasa IPA: sə́mʈ͡ʂupt͡si tɕʰŷː

Samzhubzê District (also spelled Sangzhuzi District, Samdruptse District) is a district in the Tibet Autonomous Region of the China, and the administrative center of the prefecture-level city of Shigatse (Tibetan Pinyin: Xigazê). Prior to 2014 it was known as the county-level city of Shigatse. It was the ancient capital of Ü-Tsang province and is the second largest city in Tibet with an estimated population of 117,000 in 2013. Samzhubzê is located at the confluence of the Yarlung Tsangpo River and the Nyang River (Nyang Chu or Nyanchue), about 250 km (160 mi) southwest of Lhasa and 90 km (56 mi) northwest of Gyantse, at an altitude of 3,840 metres (12,600 ft).

== History ==
In the 17th century, the city and the dzong was called Samdrubtsé (one of the transliterations of the current name). It was the capital of the Tsang.

In the 19th century, the "Tashi" or Panchen Lama had temporal power over Tashilhunpo Monastery and three small districts, though not over the town of Shigatse itself, which was administered by two Dzongpön (Prefects) appointed from Lhasa. The Tibetan territory was divided into 53 prefecture districts called Dzongs.

There were two Dzongpöns for every Dzong—a lama (Tse-dung) and a layman. They were entrusted with both civil and military powers and are equal in all respects, though subordinate to the generals and the Chinese Amban in military matters. However, there were only one or two Ambans representing the Qing (Manchu) Chinese emperor residing in Lhasa, directing a little garrison, and their power installed since 1728, progressively declined to end-up as observer at the eve of their expulsion in 1912 by the 13th Dalai Lama. In 1952, shortly after the annexation of Tibet by the People's Republic of China, Shigatse had a population of perhaps 12,000 people, making it the second largest town in Tibet.

In 1959, Shigatse was made the administrative center of an eponymous special district (专区) of Tibet. In 1970 the special district was upgraded to a prefecture and the town designated a county. In 1986 the county became a county-level city, and when the prefecture was again upgraded to a prefecture-level city in 2014, the county-level city was redesignated a district and given the new name of Samzhubzê. On 26 June 2014 Rikaze region upgraded to prefecture-level Rikaze city, the original county-level Rikaze city renamed Samzhubzê District.

== Geography and climate ==
Samzhubzê lies on flat terrain surrounded by high mountains, and the urban area is located just south of the Yarlung Zangbo River. The city lies at an elevation of around 3,840 metres (12,600 ft), and within its administrative area there are five peaks higher than 5,500 metres (18,000 ft). The city's administrative area ranges in latitude from 29° 07' to 29° 09' N and in longitude from 88° 03' to 89° 08' E.

Samzhubzê has a monsoon-influenced, alpine version of a humid continental climate (Köppen Dwb), with frosty, very dry winters and warm, wet summers. Temperatures are relatively moderate for the Tibetan Plateau, as the annual mean temperature is 6.48 °C (43.7 °F). Barely any precipitation falls from November to March, when the diurnal temperature variation can frequently exceed 20 °C (36 °F). Nearly two-thirds of the annual rainfall occurs in July and August alone. Sunshine is abundant year-round, totaling 3248 hours annually.

Samzhubzê is rich in medicinal herbs, with more than 300 varieties of commonly used medicinal plants, such as Cordyceps, Bayberry, Tianma, Snowdrop, Rhodiola Rosea, Rhubarb, etc.

Climate data for Shigatse, elevation 3,836 m (12,585 ft), (1991–2020 normals, extremes 1971–2000)
Month	Jan	Feb	Mar	Apr	May	Jun	Jul	Aug	Sep	Oct	Nov	Dec	Year
Record high °C (°F)	18.6 (65.5)	18.8 (65.8)	22.9 (73.2)	23.9 (75.0)	28.5 (83.3)	28.2 (82.8)	28.2 (82.8)	26.2 (79.2)	24.4 (75.9)	22.2 (72.0)	21.1 (70.0)	17.3 (63.1)	28.5 (83.3)
Mean daily maximum °C (°F)	7.0 (44.6)	9.0 (48.2)	12.5 (54.5)	16.0 (60.8)	19.9 (67.8)	22.9 (73.2)	21.8 (71.2)	21.0 (69.8)	20.0 (68.0)	16.7 (62.1)	11.9 (53.4)	8.4 (47.1)	15.6 (60.1)
Daily mean °C (°F)	−2.6 (27.3)	0.5 (32.9)	4.6 (40.3)	8.1 (46.6)	12.0 (53.6)	15.3 (59.5)	14.9 (58.8)	14.1 (57.4)	12.6 (54.7)	7.4 (45.3)	1.2 (34.2)	−2.5 (27.5)	7.1 (44.8)
Mean daily minimum °C (°F)	−12.2 (10.0)	−8.9 (16.0)	−4.0 (24.8)	0.4 (32.7)	4.5 (40.1)	8.6 (47.5)	9.8 (49.6)	9.2 (48.6)	6.8 (44.2)	−0.8 (30.6)	−8.0 (17.6)	−11.9 (10.6)	−0.5 (31.0)
Record low °C (°F)	−21.3 (−6.3)	−19.4 (−2.9)	−14.4 (6.1)	−9.5 (14.9)	−4.9 (23.2)	0.6 (33.1)	2.2 (36.0)	0.5 (32.9)	−1.6 (29.1)	−9.8 (14.4)	−15.5 (4.1)	−18.6 (−1.5)	−21.3 (−6.3)
Average precipitation mm (inches)	0.1 (0.00)	0.4 (0.02)	0.6 (0.02)	5.2 (0.20)	20.7 (0.81)	66.0 (2.60)	149.8 (5.90)	145.2 (5.72)	52.0 (2.05)	3.7 (0.15)	0.5 (0.02)	0.5 (0.02)	444.7 (17.51)
Average precipitation days (≥ 0.1 mm)	0.3	0.4	0.8	2.6	6.1	12.6	20.2	20.7	12.5	1.8	0.3	0.1	78.4
Average snowy days	0.6	1.2	1.7	4.3	1.6	0.1	0	0	0	0.6	0.6	0.4	11.1
Average relative humidity (%)	28	25	25	32	40	50	64	68	61	44	34	33	42
Mean monthly sunshine hours	260.4	244.0	280.0	278.5	301.8	278.6	227.4	222.5	247.5	286.3	276.5	267.8	3,171.3
Percentage possible sunshine	80	77	75	72	71	67	54	55	68	82	87	84	73
Source 1: China Meteorological Administration
Source 2: Weather China

== Administrative divisions ==
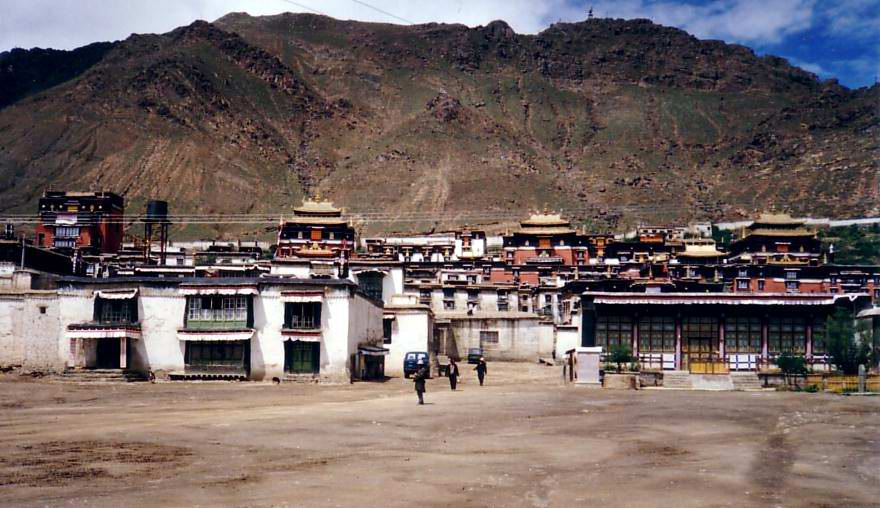
Tashilhunpo

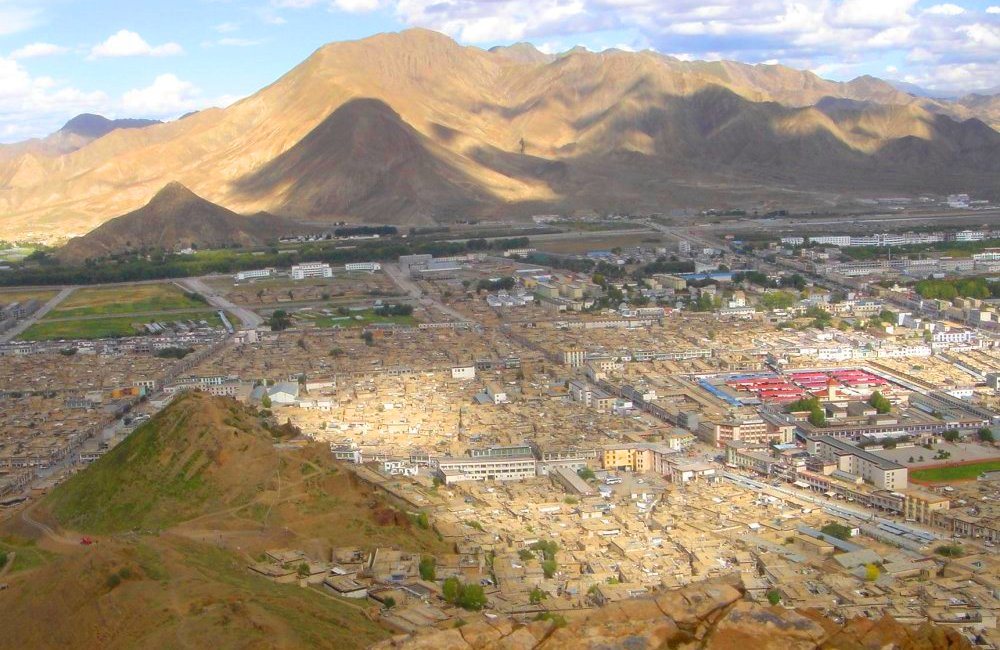
Skyline of Shigatse

Shigatse administers two subdistricts and ten townships.

Name	Chinese	Hanyu Pinyin	Tibetan	Wylie	Population (2010)	Area (km^{2})
Subdistricts
Chengbei Subdistrict	城北街道	Chéngběi Jiēdào	གྲོང་བྱང་ཁྲོམ་གཞུང	grong byang khrom gzhung	13,110	70
Chengnan Subdistrict	城南街道	Chéngnán Jiēdào	གྲོང་ལྷོ་ཁྲོམ་གཞུང	grong lho khrom gzhung	50,857	90
Townships
Lhain Township	联乡	Lián Xiāng	ལྷན་ཤང་།	lhan shang	4,823	514
Nyamo Township	年木乡	Niánmù Xiāng	ཉ་མོ་ཤང་།	nya mo shang	3,347	330
Jangdam Township	江当乡	Jiāngdāng Xiāng	ལྕགས་འདམ་ཤང་།	lcags 'dam shang	4,951	304
Benxung Township	边雄乡	Biānxióng Xiāng	སྤེན་གཞུང་ཤང་།	spen gzhung shang	4,106	230
Donggar Township	东嘎乡	Dōnggā Xiāng	གདོང་དཀར་ཤང་།	gdong dkar shang	8,625	428
Nyarixung Township	聂日雄乡	Nièrìxióng Xiāng	ཉ་རི་གཞུང་ཤང་།	nya ri gzhung shang	5,119	555
Gyacoxung Township	甲措雄乡	Jiǎcuòxióng Xiāng	རྒྱ་མཚོ་གཞུང་ཤང་།	rgya mtsho gzhung shang	11,946	471
Qugboxung Township	曲布雄乡	Qǔbùxióng Xiāng	ཕྱུག་པོ་གཞུང་ཤང་།	phyug po gzhung shang	5,428	310
Qumig Township	曲美乡	Qǔměi Xiāng	ཆུ་མིག་ཤང་།	chu mig shang	5,998	356
Nar Township	纳尔乡	Nà'ěr Xiāng	སྣར་ང་ཤང་།	snar nga shang	2,064	207

== Tashilhunpo ==
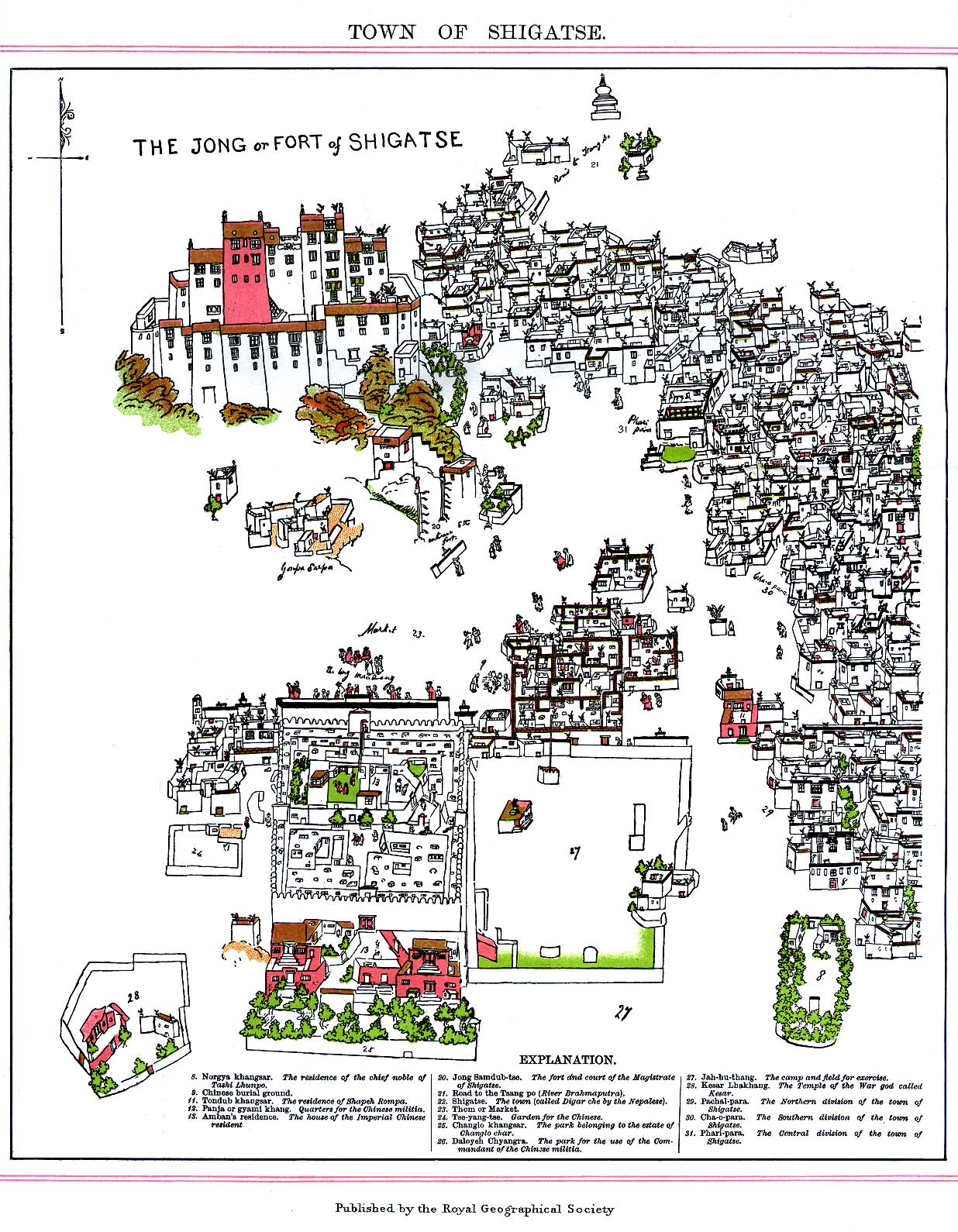
The Jong or Fort of Shigatse, a map of the town of Shigatse showing the Dzong or fort, from Journey to Lhasa and Central Tibet by Sarat Chandra Das, 1902.

Samzhubzê contains the huge Tashilhunpo Monastery, founded in 1447 by Gendun Drup, the First Dalai Lama. It is the traditional seat of the Panchen Lamas. Until the Chinese arrived in the 1950s, the "Tashi" or Panchen Lama had temporal power over three small districts, though not over Samzhubzê itself, which was administered by a dzongpön (general) appointed from Lhasa. In the 2nd week of the 5th lunar month (around June/July), Tashilhunpo Monastery is the scene of a 3-day festival and a huge thangka is displayed.

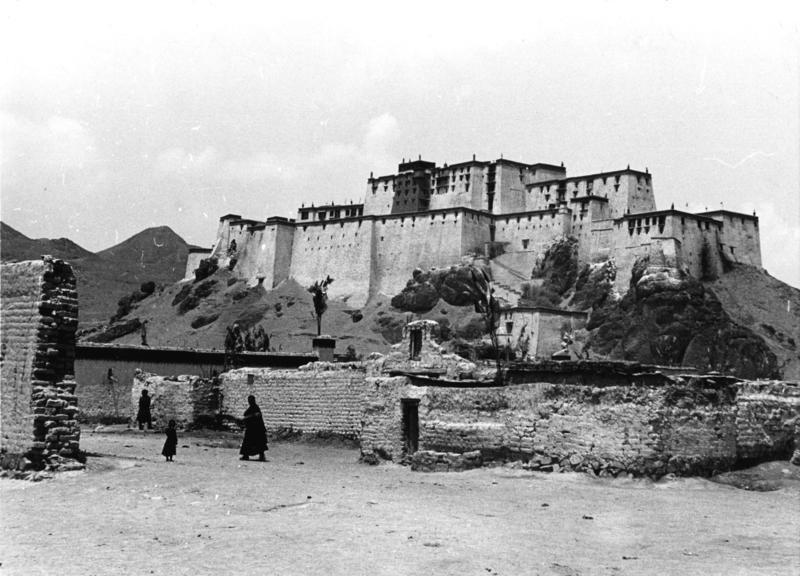
Shigatse fortress. Samdrubtse Dzong. 1938.

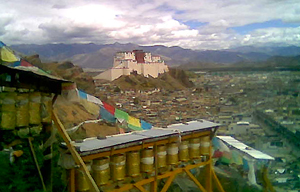
The reconstructed castle (dzong) of Shigatse. 2007.

The imposing castle, Samdrubtse Dzong or "Shigatse Dzong", was probably built in the 15th century. It looked something like a smaller version of the Potala Palace in Lhasa, and had turret-like fortifications at the ends and a central Red Palace. It used to be the seat of the kings of Ü-Tsang and the capital of the province of Ü-Tsang or Tsang.

The castle was totally dismantled, rock by rock, by hundreds of Tibetans at the instigation of the Chinese in 1961. Between 2005 and 2007, the building was reconstructed, financed by donations from Shanghai. Such "Preservation and Reparation Project of Sangzhutse Fortress of Shigatse City" was completed in May 2007 and was designed by the Construction Design Institute of Shanghai Tongji University. Old photographs served as a basis for the reconstruction, which was executed in concrete. Afterwards, the exterior was to be wainscotted with natural stones. The dzong, which in the 17th century served as a model for the construction of the Potala Palace, is set to become a museum for Tibetan culture.

Nearby attractions include:

- Shalu Monastery
- Narthang, the first printing establishment in central Tibet
- Mount Everest

== Infrastructure and transport ==
- Samzhubzê is the hub of the road network between Lhasa, Nepal and western Tibet.
- Construction started in 2010 of the Lhasa–Shigatse Railway to Samzhubzê and was completed in 2014. Start operated on 15 August 2014. A further extension to the Nepalese border is planned.
- The nearest railhead in India is the station of New Jalpaiguri, a suburb of Siliguri, West Bengal.
- Shigatse Peace Airport began operations on 30 October 2010 and was Tibet's fifth commercial airport. It is located 43 kilometres from central Shigatse at Jangdam Township at an altitude of 3,782 metres. The airport is designed to handle up to 230,000 passengers annually by 2020.
- China National Highway 318
