= Riwoche County =

Riwoche 类乌齐县 • རི་བོ་ཆེ་རྫོང་། Riwoqê
- County
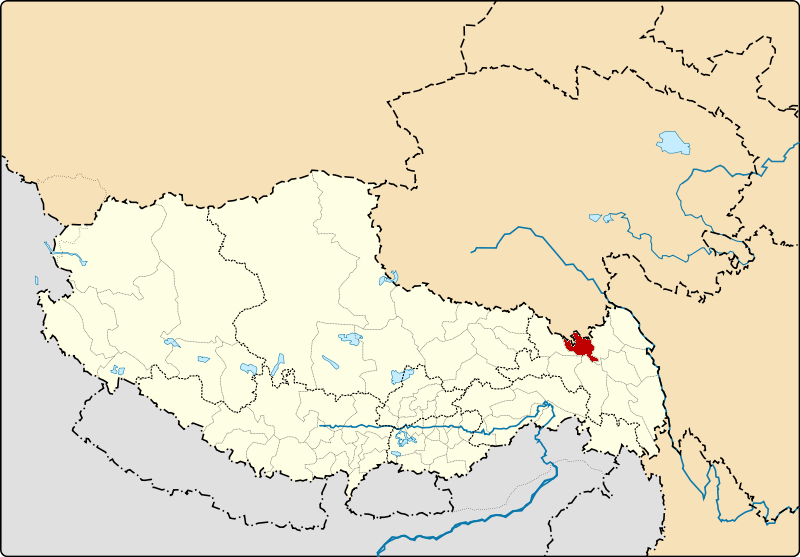
- Location of Riwoqê County within Tibet

- Location of the seat in the Tibet AR Riwoche (China)
- Coordinates (Riwoqê County government): 31°12′42″N 96°36′01″E
- Country: China
- Autonomous region: Tibet
- Prefecture-level city: Chamdo
- County seat: Sado

Area
  - Total: 6,337.93 km^{2} (2,447.09 sq mi)

Population (2020)
  - Total: 58,856
  - Density: 9.2863/km^{2} (24.051/sq mi)
- Time zone: UTC+8 (China Standard)
- Website: leiwuqi.changdu.gov.cn

Riwoche County

Chinese name
- Simplified Chinese: 类乌齐县
- Traditional Chinese: 類烏齊縣
Transcriptions
Standard Mandarin
- Hanyu Pinyin: Lèiwūqí Xiàn

Tibetan name
- Tibetan: རི་བོ་ཆེ་རྫོང་།
Transcriptions
- Wylie: ri bo che rdzong
- Tibetan Pinyin: Riwoqê Zong

Riwoche (Tibetan: རི་བོ་ཆེ་རྫོང་།; Chinese: 类乌齐县) is a county under the administration of the prefecture-level city of Chamdo in the Tibet Autonomous Region, China. The county lies in eastern Tibet and borders Qinghai province to the north.

Riwoche is the name of the county, the county capital, and the small village where the main monastery is located. Riwoche sits at around 3,400 m (11,200 ft) above sea level. The Dzi River flows through the region. The county grows barley and wheat. Khampa inhabitants of the area lives in houses made of wood. The area is highly mountainous, and in contrast to the high altitude grasslands predominant in Tibetan Plateau, Riwoche is lush all year round with evergreen forests. Riwoche's climate is mild by Tibetan standards, with daytime high temperatures generally above −4 °C (25 °F) in winter and 20 °C (68 °F) in summer.

== Administrative divisions ==
Riwoche County is divided in 2 towns and 8 townships.

| Name | Chinese | Hanyu Pinyin | Tibetan | Wylie |
|---|---|---|---|---|
Town
| Riwoche Town (Riwoqê) | 类乌齐镇 | Lèiwūqí zhèn | རི་བོ་ཆེ་གྲོང་རྡལ། | ri bo che grong rdal |
| Sado Town (Samdo) | 桑多镇 | Sāngduō zhèn | ས་མདོ་གྲོང་རྡལ། | sa mdo grong rdal |
Townships
| Jagsamka Township | 甲桑卡乡 | Jiǎsāngkǎ xiāng | ལྕགས་ཟམ་ཁ་ཤང་། | lcags zam kha shang |
| Chamoling Township | 长毛岭乡 | Chángmáolǐng xiāng | ཁྲ་མོ་གླིང་ཤང་། | khra mo gling shang |
| Kangda Township | 岗色乡 | Gǎngsè xiāng | གངས་གཟེ་ཤང་། | gangs gze shang |
| Jigdoi Township | 吉多乡 | Jíduō xiāng | ལྗིག་སྟོད་ཤང་། | ljig stod shang |
| Pênda Township | 宾达乡 | Bīndá xiāng | བེའུ་མདའ་ཤང་། | be'u mda' shang |
| Karmardo Township | 卡玛多乡 | Kǎmǎduō xiāng | མཁར་དམར་མདོ་ཤང་། | mkhar dmar mdo shang |
| Samka Township | 尚卡乡 | Shàngkǎ xiāng | ཟམ་ཁ་ཤང་། | zam kha shang |
| Yeru Township | 伊日乡 | Yīrì xiāng | གཡས་རུ་ཤང་། | g.yas ru shang |

== Climate ==
Climate data for Riwoche, elevation 3,810 m (12,500 ft), (1991–2020 normals, extremes 1981–2010)
| Month | Jan | Feb | Mar | Apr | May | Jun | Jul | Aug | Sep | Oct | Nov | Dec | Year |
|---|---|---|---|---|---|---|---|---|---|---|---|---|---|
| Record high °C (°F) | 17.2 (63.0) | 16.2 (61.2) | 20.0 (68.0) | 22.6 (72.7) | 24.4 (75.9) | 28.0 (82.4) | 28.7 (83.7) | 26.4 (79.5) | 24.7 (76.5) | 22.8 (73.0) | 17.0 (62.6) | 16.2 (61.2) | 28.7 (83.7) |
| Mean daily maximum °C (°F) | 3.9 (39.0) | 5.6 (42.1) | 8.3 (46.9) | 11.8 (53.2) | 16.0 (60.8) | 19.3 (66.7) | 20.2 (68.4) | 19.8 (67.6) | 17.9 (64.2) | 13.0 (55.4) | 8.3 (46.9) | 5.9 (42.6) | 12.5 (54.5) |
| Daily mean °C (°F) | −6.4 (20.5) | −3.8 (25.2) | −0.1 (31.8) | 3.6 (38.5) | 7.7 (45.9) | 11.4 (52.5) | 12.6 (54.7) | 11.9 (53.4) | 9.6 (49.3) | 4.4 (39.9) | −1.6 (29.1) | −1.1 (30.0) | 4.0 (39.2) |
| Mean daily minimum °C (°F) | −14.7 (5.5) | −11.6 (11.1) | −6.9 (19.6) | −2.7 (27.1) | 1.3 (34.3) | 5.7 (42.3) | 7.4 (45.3) | 6.7 (44.1) | 4.2 (39.6) | −1.3 (29.7) | −8.6 (16.5) | −13.6 (7.5) | −2.8 (26.9) |
| Record low °C (°F) | −25.9 (−14.6) | −29.4 (−20.9) | −23.7 (−10.7) | −12.1 (10.2) | −9.2 (15.4) | −3.5 (25.7) | −1.8 (28.8) | −3.2 (26.2) | −5.7 (21.7) | −13.0 (8.6) | −23.0 (−9.4) | −28.6 (−19.5) | −29.4 (−20.9) |
| Average precipitation mm (inches) | 2.7 (0.11) | 7.0 (0.28) | 14.1 (0.56) | 31.0 (1.22) | 53.2 (2.09) | 110.5 (4.35) | 132.0 (5.20) | 126.8 (4.99) | 95.2 (3.75) | 38.2 (1.50) | 7.7 (0.30) | 1.7 (0.07) | 620.1 (24.42) |
| Average precipitation days (≥ 0.1 mm) | 3.3 | 5.2 | 9.5 | 13.3 | 14.9 | 19.6 | 21.0 | 19.5 | 17.7 | 10.8 | 4.5 | 2.2 | 141.5 |
| Average snowy days | 5.1 | 8.1 | 14.0 | 16.9 | 7.0 | 0.8 | 0.1 | 0.2 | 0.8 | 9.7 | 7.4 | 4.0 | 74.1 |
| Average relative humidity (%) | 44 | 46 | 50 | 56 | 58 | 64 | 69 | 71 | 70 | 64 | 54 | 47 | 58 |
| Mean monthly sunshine hours | 207.0 | 180.0 | 187.3 | 182.4 | 197.4 | 170.7 | 172.4 | 167.1 | 160.6 | 178.3 | 201.8 | 216.6 | 2,221.6 |
| Percentage possible sunshine | 64 | 57 | 50 | 47 | 46 | 40 | 40 | 41 | 44 | 51 | 64 | 69 | 51 |
Source: China Meteorological Administration

== Attractions ==
Yiri Hot Spring is located at Riwoqê County, surrounded by the hills, is a famous hot spring which is reputed to cure diseases.

Riwoche is also home to the famous Riwoche Monastery, the main set of the Taklung Kagyu, situated 29 km north of the Riwoche Town, and 134 km west of Chamdo.

Jiumichan Monastery is within Riwoqê County, 105 km away from the county seat, is a national key scenic spot.

Naitang Monastery is located at Riwoqê County, with Dingxia Mountain on the back, Naishui River in the front, and Duoji Cliff on the north. Buddhists thought it as the holy land of Ruchi 16 Arhats, called it Naitang Monastery.

== Riwoche horses ==
Riwoche is also known for a unique horse breed called Riwoche horses, thought to be the missing link between modern horses and prehistoric horses after ground-breaking research in 1995.

== Transportation ==
- China National Highway 214
- China National Highway 317

== See also ==
- Bangru (village)
