= Lhain Township =

Lhain ལྷན་ · 联乡
- Township
- Location within Tibet
- Coordinates (Lhain Township government): 29°18′05″N 89°33′17″E
- Country: People's Republic of China
- Autonomous region: Tibet
- Prefecture-level city: Shigatse
- District: Samzhubzê

Area
  - Total: 514 km^{2} (198 sq mi)

Population (2010)
  - Total: 4,823
  - Major Nationalities: Tibetan
  - Regional dialect: Tibetan language
- Time zone: UTC+8 (China Standard)

Lhain (Tibetan: ལྷན་; simplified Chinese: 联乡; traditional Chinese: 聯鄉; pinyin: Lián Xiāng) is a village and township of Samzhubzê District (Shigatse City), in the Tibet Autonomous Region of China. At the time of the 2010 census, the township had a population of 4,823 and an area of 514 square kilometres (198 sq mi). As of 2019, it had 16 villages under its administration.
