= Nyirixung Township =

Nyarixung ཉ་རི་གཞུང་ · 聂日雄乡
- Township
- Location within Tibet
- Coordinates: 29°19′30″N 88°47′29″E
- Country: People's Republic of China
- Autonomous region: Tibet
- Prefecture-level city: Shigatse
- District: Samzhubzê

Area
  - Total: 555 km^{2} (214 sq mi)

Population (2010)
  - Total: 5,119
  - Major Nationalities: Tibetan
  - Regional dialect: Tibetan language
- Time zone: UTC+8 (China Standard)

Nyarixung (Tibetan: ཉ་རི་གཞུང་), also Nierixiong (simplified Chinese: 聂日雄乡; traditional Chinese: 聶日雄鄉; pinyin: Nièrìxióng Xiāng), is a township of Samzhubzê District (Shigatse City), in the Tibet Autonomous Region of China. At the time of the 2010 census, the township had a population of 5,119 and an area of 555 square kilometres (214 sq mi). As of 2019, it had 16 villages under its administration. The main village of Nyarixung lies 15.3 kilometres (9.5 mi) by road to the northwest of the city of Shigatse, on the south bank of the Yarlung Tsangpo River.
