= Nar Township =

Nar སྣར་ང་ · 纳尔乡
- Township
- Location within Tibet
- Coordinates (Nar Township government): 29°04′17″N 88°42′06″E
- Country: People's Republic of China
- Autonomous region: Tibet
- Prefecture-level city: Shigatse
- District: Samzhubzê

Area
  - Total: 207 km^{2} (80 sq mi)

Population (2010)
  - Total: 2,064
  - Major Nationalities: Tibetan
  - Regional dialect: Tibetan language
- Time zone: UTC+8 (China Standard)

Nar (Tibetan: སྣར་ང་; simplified Chinese: 纳尔乡; traditional Chinese: 納爾鄉) is a township of Samzhubzê District (Shigatse City), in the Tibet Autonomous Region of China. At the time of the 2010 census, the township had a population of 2,064 and an area of 207 square kilometres (80 sq mi). As of 2015, it had 10 villages under its administration.
