= Tobgyai Township =

Village in Tibet

Coordinates: 29°20′N 89°26′E

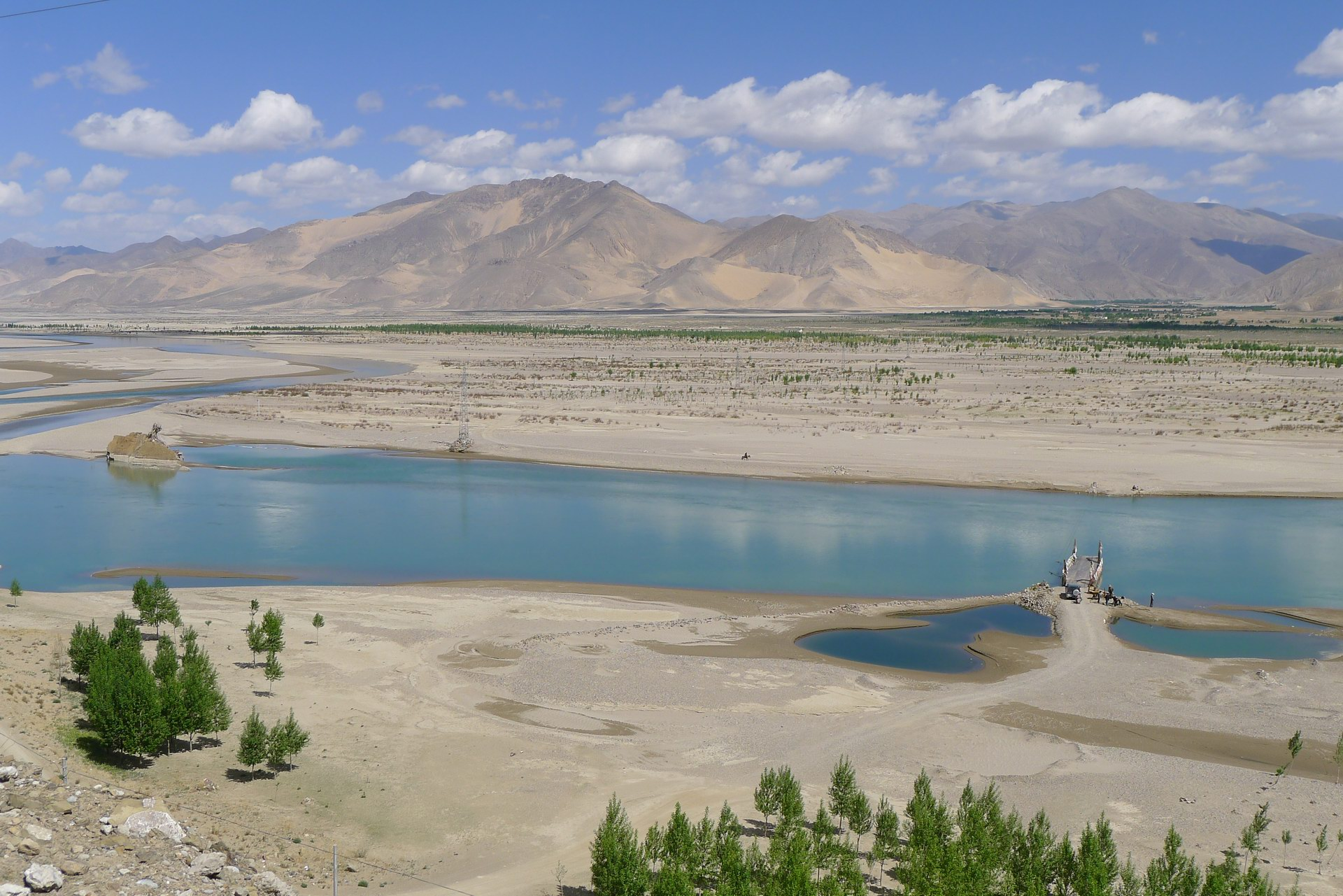
Ferry crossing Yarlung Tsangpo to Tobgyai

Tobgyai is a village and township in the Tibet Autonomous Region of China.

== See also ==
- List of towns and villages in Tibet
