= Yamo Township =

Yagmo
- Location within Tibet
- Coordinates: 29°25′N 87°39′E
- Country: China
- Region: Tibet

Population
  - Total
  - Major Nationalities: Tibetan
  - Regional dialect: Tibetan language
- Time zone: +8

Yagmo is a village and township in the Tibet Autonomous Region of China.

== See also ==
- List of towns and villages in Tibet
