= Qugboxung Township =

Qugboxung ཕྱུག་པོ་གཞུང་ · 曲布雄乡
- Township
- Location within Tibet
- Coordinates (Qugboxung Township government): 29°11′27″N 88°52′33″E
- Country: People's Republic of China
- Autonomous region: Tibet
- Prefecture-level city: Shigatse
- District: Samzhubzê

Area
  - Total: 310 km^{2} (120 sq mi)

Population (2010)
  - Total: 5,428
  - Major Nationalities: Tibetan
  - Regional dialect: Tibetan language
- Time zone: UTC+8 (China Standard)

Qugboxung (Tibetan: ཕྱུག་པོ་གཞུང་; Chinese: 曲布雄乡; pinyin: Qūbùxióng Xiāng) is a village and township of the Samzhubzê District (Shigatse City), in the Tibet Autonomous Region of China. At the time of the 2010 census, the township had a population of 5,428 and an area of 310 square kilometres (120 sq mi).As of 2013, it had 15 villages under its administration.
