= Baqên Town =

Baqên Town སྦྲ་ཆེན་
- Township

Chinese transcription(s)
  - Traditional: 巴青乡
  - Simplified: 巴青乡
  - Pinyin: Bāqīng Xiang
- Location within Tibet Autonomous Region
- Coordinates: 32°5′0″N 93°36′0″E
- Country: China
- Region: Tibet Autonomous Region
- Prefecture: Nagqu Prefecture
- County: Lhari County

Population
  - Total: 392
  - Major Nationalities: Tibetan
  - Regional dialect: Tibetan language
- Time zone: +8

Baqên Township (Tibetan: སྦྲ་ཆེན་, Wylie Sbra Chen; Chinese: 巴青乡; pinyin: Bāqīng Xiang) is a small township in Baqên County within Nagqu Prefecture in the north of the Tibet Autonomous Region of China.

== See also ==
- List of towns and villages in Tibet Autonomous Region
