= Nyamo Township =

Nyamo ཉ་མོ་ · 年木乡
- Township
- Location within Tibet
- Coordinates (Nyamo Township government): 29°19′04″N 89°26′43″E
- Country: People's Republic of China
- Autonomous region: Tibet
- Prefecture-level city: Shigatse
- District: Samzhubzê

Area
  - Total: 330 km^{2} (130 sq mi)

Population (2010)
  - Total: 3,347
  - Major Nationalities: Tibetan
  - Regional dialect: Tibetan language
- Time zone: UTC+8 (China Standard)

Nyamo (Tibetan: ཉ་མོ་), or Nianmu (Chinese: 年木乡; pinyin: Niánmù Xiāng), is a township of Samzhubzê District (Shigatse City), in the Tibet Autonomous Region of China. At the time of the 2010 census, the township had a population of 3,347 and an area of 330 square kilometres (130 sq mi). As of 2019, it had 10 villages under its administration.
