= Baqên County =

Baqên County 巴青县 • སྦྲ་ཆེན་རྫོང་།
- County
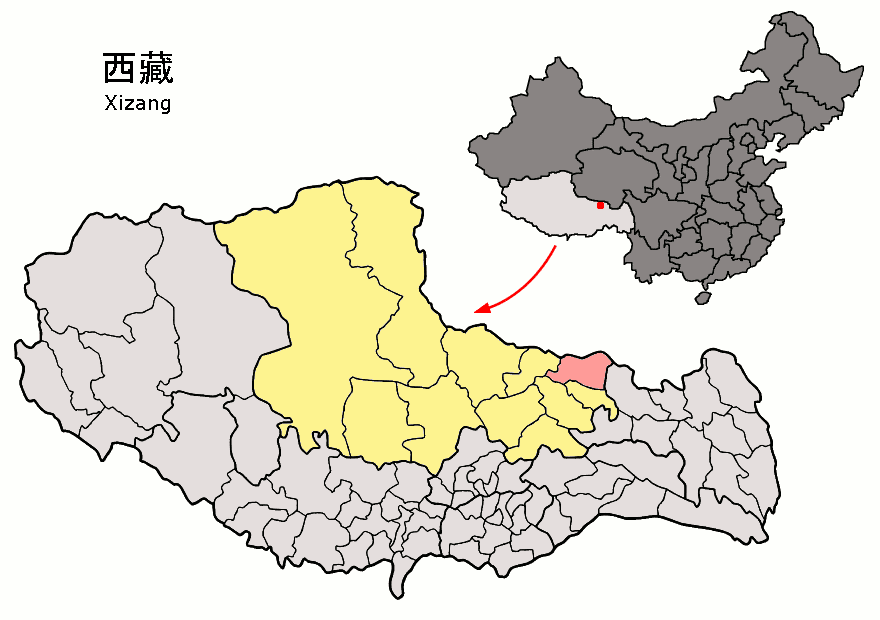
- Location of Baqên County (red) within Nagqu City (yellow) and the Tibet Autonomous Region

- Location of the seat in the Tibet Autonomous Region Baqên (China)
- Coordinates: 32°35′41″N 93°55′49″E
- Country: China
- Autonomous region: Tibet
- Prefecture-level city: Nagqu
- County seat: Lhashé

Area
  - Total: 9,810.67 km^{2} (3,787.92 sq mi)

Population (2020)
  - Total: 56,200
  - Density: 5.73/km^{2} (14.8/sq mi)
- Time zone: UTC+8 (China Standard)
- Website: www.nqbqx.gov.cn

Baqên County

Chinese name
- Simplified Chinese: 巴青县
- Traditional Chinese: 巴青縣
Transcriptions
Standard Mandarin
- Hanyu Pinyin: Bāqīng Xiàn
Yue: Cantonese
- Jyutping: baa^{1}cing^{1} jyun^{2}

Tibetan name
- Tibetan: སྦྲ་ཆེན་རྫོང་།
Transcriptions
- Wylie: sbra chen rdzong
- Tibetan Pinyin: Baqên Zong

Baqên County (Tibetan: སྦྲ་ཆེན་རྫོང་།; Chinese: 巴青县) is a county within Nagqu of the Tibet Autonomous Region, China. It is located in northeastern Tibet and borders with Qinghai.

== Administrative divisions ==
Baqên county contains 3 towns and 7 townships.

| Name | Chinese | Hanyu Pinyin | Tibetan | Wylie |
|---|---|---|---|---|
Towns
| Lhashé Town | 拉西镇 | Lāxī zhèn | ལྷ་ཤེས་གྲོང་རྡལ། | lha shes grong rdal |
| Dzasib Town | 杂色镇 | Zásè zhèn | རྫ་སྲིབ་གྲོང་རྡལ། | rdza srib grong rdal |
| Ya'nga Town | 雅安镇 | Yǎ'ān zhèn | ཡ་ང་གྲོང་རྡལ། | ya nga grong rdal |
Townships
| Mamta Township | 江绵乡 | Jiāngmián xiāng | མམ་ཐ་ཤང་། | mam tha shang |
| Marru Township | 玛如乡 | Mǎrú xiāng | དམར་རུ་ཤང་། | dmar ru shang |
| Arshok Township | 阿秀乡 | Āxiù xiāng | ཨར་ཤོག་ཤང་། | ar shog shang |
| Gangri Township | 贡日乡 | Gòngrì xiāng | སྒང་རི་ཤང་། | sgor ri shang |
| Gangchen Township | 岗切乡 | Gǎngqiē xiāng | གངས་ཆེན་ཤང་། | gangs chen shang |
| Baqên Township | 巴青乡 | Bāqīng xiāng | སྦྲ་ཆེན་ཤང་། | sbra chen shang |
| Bönta Township | 本塔乡 | Běntǎ xiāng | བོན་མཐའ་ཤང་། | bon mtha' shang |

== Transport ==
- China National Highway 317
