= Qusum Town =

Qusum
- Location within Tibet Autonomous Region
- Coordinates: 29°3′3″N 92°13′18″E
- Country: China
- Region: Tibet Autonomous Region
- Prefecture: Shannan Prefecture
- County: Qusum County

Population
  - Total
  - Major Nationalities: Tibetan
  - Regional dialect: Tibetan language
- Time zone: +8

Qusum (Tibetan: ཆུ་གསུམ་, Wylie: Chu-gsum; THDL Romanisation: Chusum) is a small Tibetan town and township in Qusum County in the Shannan Prefecture of Tibet, some 128 km from Lhasa.

== See also ==
- List of towns and villages in Tibet
