= Chengnan Subdistrict, Shigatse =

Chengnan Subdistrict 城南街道 · གྲོང་ལྷོ་དོན་གཅོད་
- Subdistrict
- Location within Tibet
- Coordinates (Chengnan Subdistrict office): 29°16′12″N 88°52′48″E
- Country: People's Republic of China
- Autonomous region: Tibet
- Prefecture-level city: Shigatse
- District: Samzhubzê

Area
  - Total: 90 km^{2} (35 sq mi)

Population (2010)
  - Total: 50,857
  - Major Nationalities: Tibetan
  - Regional dialect: Tibetan language
- Time zone: UTC+8 (China Standard)

Chengnan Subdistrict (Chinese: 城南街道; pinyin: Chéngnán Jiēdào; Tibetan: གྲོང་ལྷོ་དོན་གཅོད་, Wylie: grong lho don gcod ) is a subdistrict of Samzhubzê District, Shigatse, in the Tibet Autonomous Region of China. At the time of the 2010 census, the subdistrict had a population of 50,857 and an area of 90 square kilometres (35 sq mi). As of 2019, it has five residential communities (社区) under its administration.
