= Qusum County =

Qusum County 曲松县 • ཆུ་གསུམ་རྫོང་།
- County
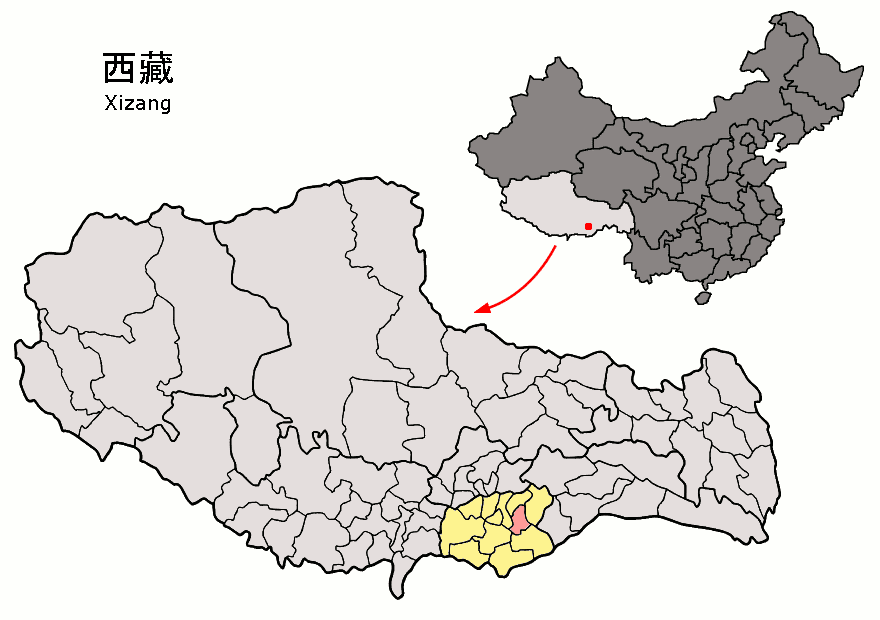
- Location of Qusum County (red) within Shannan City (yellow) and the Tibet Autonomous Region

- Location of the seat in Tibet Qusum (China)
- Coordinates (Qusum County government): 29°03′46″N 92°12′13″E
- Country: China
- Autonomous region: Tibet
- Prefecture-level city: Shannan (Lhoka)
- Seat: Qusum

Area
  - Total: 2,069.98 km^{2} (799.22 sq mi)

Population (2020)
  - Total: 12,962
  - Density: 6.2619/km^{2} (16.218/sq mi)
- Time zone: UTC+8 (China Standard)
- Website: www.qusong.gov.cn

Qusum County

Chinese name
- Simplified Chinese: 曲松县
- Traditional Chinese: 曲松縣
Transcriptions
Standard Mandarin
- Hanyu Pinyin: Qūsōng Xiàn

Tibetan name
- Tibetan: ཆུ་གསུམ་རྫོང་།
Transcriptions
- Wylie: chu gsum rdzong
- Tibetan Pinyin: Qusum Zong

Qusum County (Tibetan: ཆུ་གསུམ་རྫོང; Chinese: 曲松县) is a county under the administration of the prefecture-level city of Shannan in the Tibet Autonomous Region, China.

In 1999 the county had a population of 15,541 inhabitants. The capital is Qusum.

== Administrative divisions ==
Qusum County contains 2 towns and 3 townships.

Name	Chinese	Hanyu Pinyin	Tibetan	Wylie
Towns
Qusum Town	曲松镇	Qǔsōng zhèn	ཆུ་གསུམ་གྲོང་རྡལ།	chu gsum grong rdal
Lababsa Town	罗布沙镇	Luóbùshā zhèn	ལ་བབས་ས་གྲོང་རྡལ།	la babs sa grong rdal
Townships
Shakjang Township	下江乡	Xiàjiāng xiāng	ཤག་བྱང་ཤང་།	shag byang shang
Qundo'gyang Township	邱多江乡	Qiūduōjiāng xiāng	ཆུ་མདོ་རྒྱང་ཤང་།	chu mdo rgyang shang
Tözik Township	堆随乡	Duīsuí xiāng	སྟོད་གཟིགས་ཤང་།	stod gzigs shang
