= Coqen =

Coqen may refer to:

- Coqên County, county in Tibet
- Coqên Town, a town in Tibet
