= Raka, Tibet =

Raka
- Village

Tibetan transcription(s)
  - Tibetan: ་

Chinese transcription(s)
  - Traditional: 中文
- Location within Tibet
- Coordinates: 29°25′7″N 85°47′47″E
- Country: People's Republic of China
- Region: Tibet
- Prefecture: Shigatse Prefecture
- County: Saga County
- Township: Saga Town

Population
  - Major Nationalities: Tibetan
  - Regional dialect: Tibetan language
- Time zone: +8

Raka is a village in Saga Town in Saga County in the Shigatse Prefecture of the Tibet Autonomous Region of China. It lies along the G219 road near the junction with the northern heading S206 road on the road to Qierexiang, roughly 50 kilometres (31 mi) east of Saga. Historically it lay in the province of Tsang. Raka is very well connected, connected by provincial highway 206 to Coqen in the north, Saga in the southwest and Lhatse, Shigatse and Lhasa to the east. Several kilometres to the east is the village of Kyêrdo. An "enormous tributary" called the Raka Tsanpo flows nearby and the saline lake of Raka Lake is also located in the vicinity.

== See also ==
- List of towns and villages in Tibet
