= Lunpo Gangri =

Mountain in Tibet, China

- Loingbo Kangri
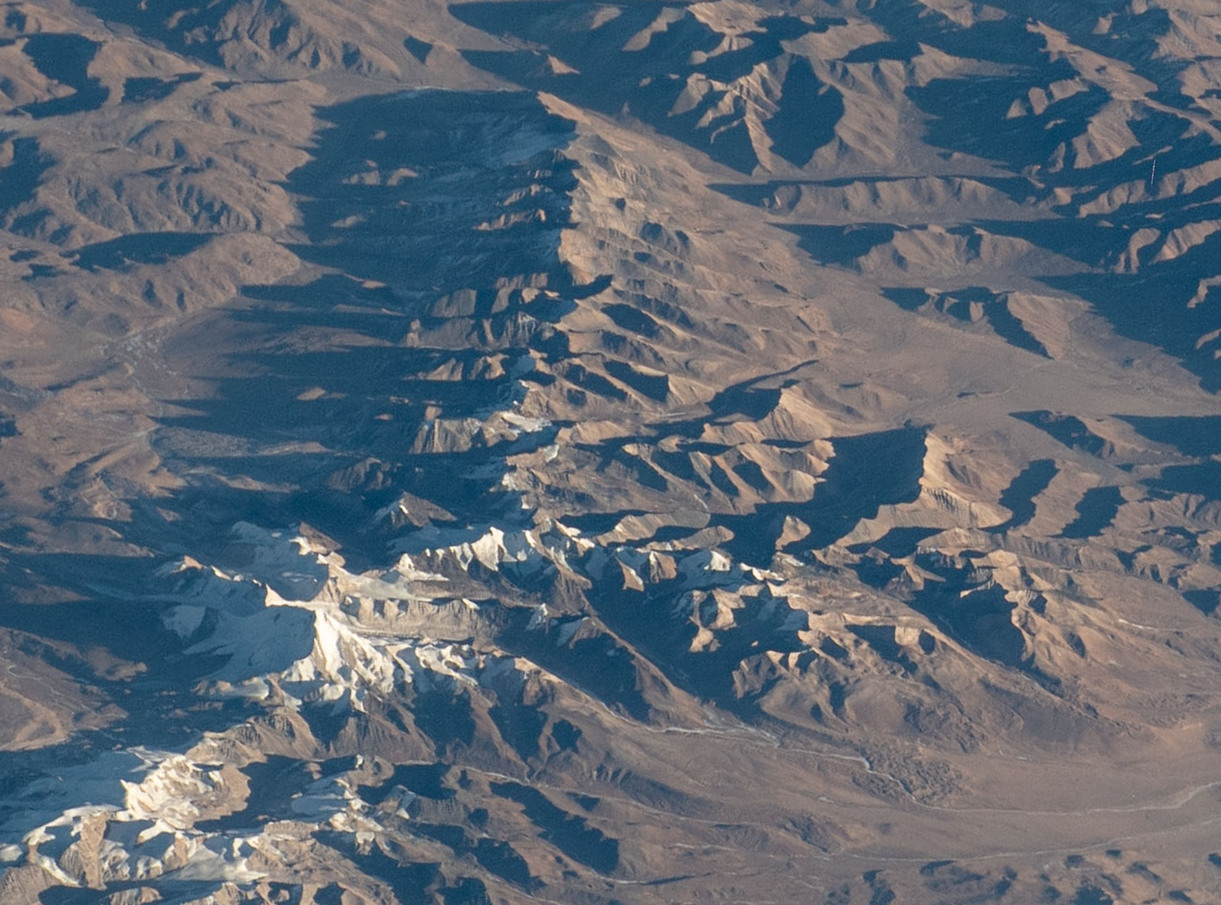
- Loinbo Kangri with glaciers, North-West of Ru'gyog (Ro'gyog Township)

Highest point
- Elevation: 7,095 m (23,278 ft)
- Prominence: 1,941 m (6,368 ft)
- Listing: Ultra
- Coordinates: 29°50′00″N 84°36′48″E

Geography
- Location within China
- Location: Saga and Zhongba counties, Tibet, China
- Parent range: Gangdise Shan

Lunpo Gangri, also known as Loinbo Kangri, is a Himalayan mountain in Shigatse Prefecture, Tibet Autonomous Region, China. It has an elevation of 7,095 metres (23,278 ft) and is the highest peak in the Gangdise range (Kailash Range). The second highest and most famous peak in the Kailash Range is Mount Kailash which is considered sacred in four religions: Hinduism, Buddhism, Jainism and Bon.

== See also ==
- Geography of Tibet
- List of mountains by elevation
- List of ultras of Tibet, East Asia and neighbouring areas
- List of mountains in China
