= Dawa =

Dawa or Dawah may refer to:

== Places ==
=== China ===
- Dawa, Jilin, in Ningjiang District, Songyuan
- Dawa County (大洼县), Panjin, Liaoning
- Dawa, Dawa County, Liaoning
- Dawa, Changtu County, Liaoning

=== Other countries ===
- Dawa River, a river in Kenya, Ethiopia, and Somalia
- Dire Dawa, an autonomous city in Ethiopia

== Other uses ==
- Dawah, the act of inviting people to Islam
- Dawa (surname)
- Dawa (Tibetan phrase), meaning "moon" or "month"
- Al Dawa, defunct political journal in Egypt
- Islamic Dawa Party, an Iraqi conservative political party
- Deutsch-Amerikanischen Wirtschafts-Ausschuss, a pro-Nazi group in 1930's USA
