= Dajia Lake =

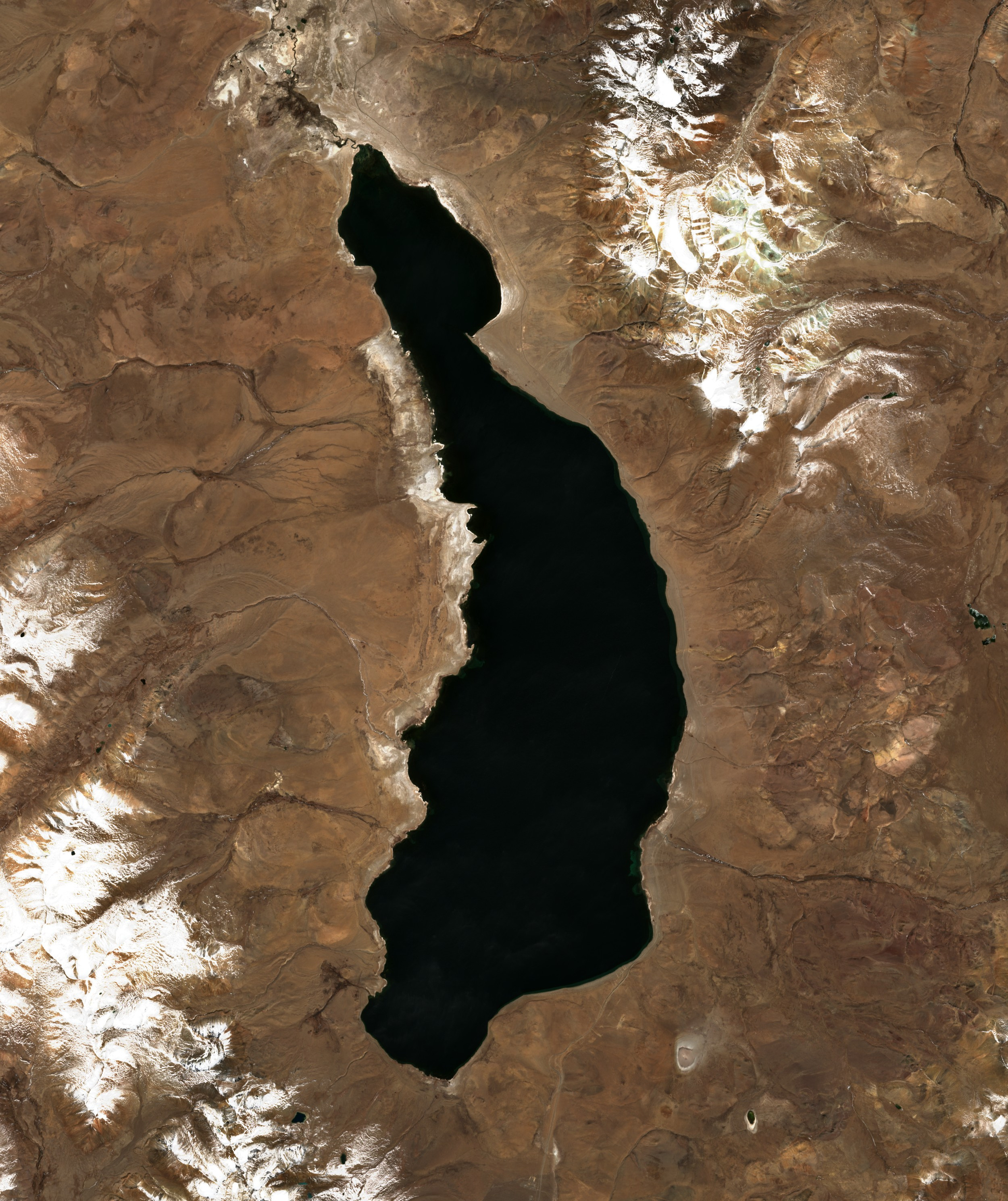
- Sentinel-2 image (2022)

- Location within Ngari
- Location: Saga County, Shigatse Prefecture, Tibet Autonomous Region, China
- Coordinates: 29°50′34″N 85°43′54″E
- Lake type: Salt lake
- Catchment area: 630.5 km^{2} (200 sq mi)
- Basin countries: China
- Max. length: 7.7 km (5 mi)
- Max. width: 25 km (16 mi)
- Surface area: 145 km^{2} (100 sq mi)
- Surface elevation: 5,170 m (16,962 ft)

Dajia Lake (Chinese: 打加错; pinyin: Dǎjiā Cuò) or Tak Kyel Tso (Tibetan: སྟག་རྐྱལ་མཚོ, Wylie: stag rkyal mtsho, ZWPY: Takkyel Tso), is a lake in Saga County in the Shigatse Prefecture of the Tibet Autonomous Region of China. It is located about halfway between Lake Peiku and Zhari Namco, northeast of Saga.
