= Semo La =

Mountain pass in Tibet, China

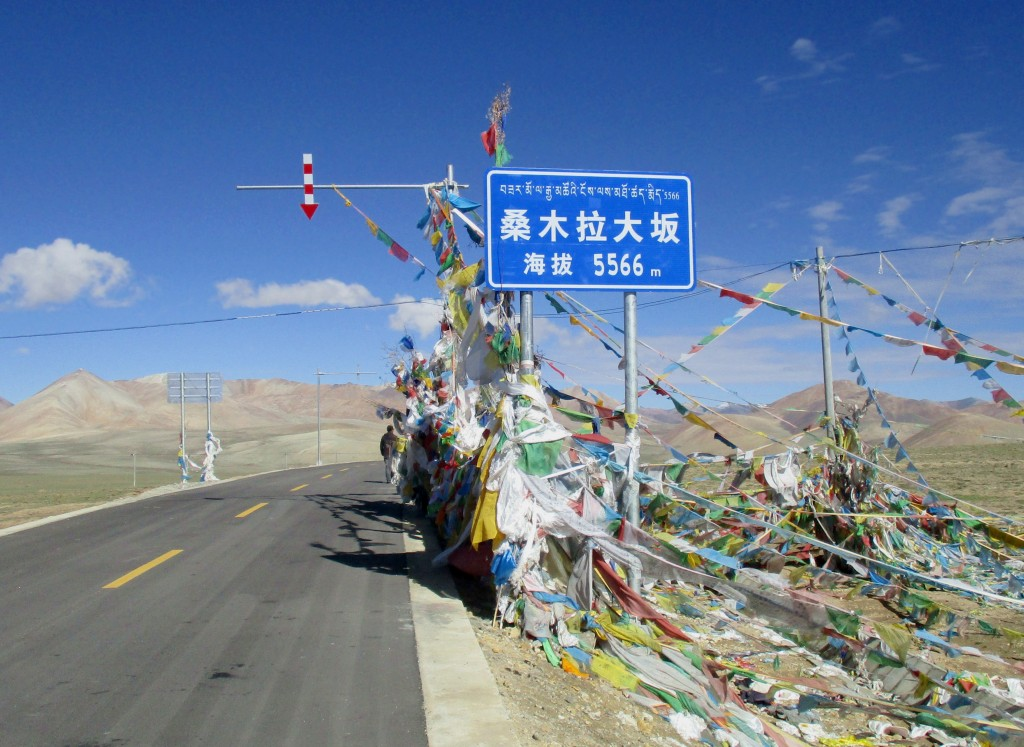
- Tibet S206 at Semo La

- Location within Ngari
- Elevation: 5,565.1 m (18,258 ft)
- Traversed by: Tibet Provincial Road S206

Third Approach
- Location: Coqen, Ngari, Tibet, China
- Range: Gangdise Shan, Transhimalaya, Tibetan Plateau
- Coordinates: 30°06′36″N 85°25′54″E

Semo La

Chinese name
- Traditional Chinese: 桑木拉大坂
- Simplified Chinese: 桑木拉大坂
- Literal meaning: Semo La pass (dàbǎn is a Uyghur loanword for pass)
Transcriptions
Standard Mandarin
- Hanyu Pinyin: sāngmù lā dàbǎn

Tibetan name
- Tibetan: བཟར་མོ་ལ
Transcriptions
- Wylie: bzar mo la

Semo La (Chinese: 桑木拉大坂; Standard Tibetan: བཟར་མོ་ལ) is a mountain pass situated in Coqên County, Ngari Prefecture in the central part of Tibet and gives access to the Changtang region. It is found on the so-called Northern Route, north of Raka and south of Town of Coqên in Central Tibet. Travellers use this route as an alternative access route to western Tibet and Mount Kailash, especially when mud makes access by the more southern route difficult.

The road crossing the pass was once an old unsurfaced track travelled only by a weekly bus and trucks heading west to avoid the boggy parts of the south of the country. The construction of paved road through the pass, Tibet Provincial Road S206, was finished in late 2015.

== Elevation ==
The height according to the Tibet Department of Transportation is 5,565 m (18,258 ft); however, the signage at the road rounded it up to 5,566 m (18,261 ft). In 2005, a Catalan cartographic expedition certified the height to be 5,565.1 m (18,258 ft).

At 5,565 metres (18,258 ft), Semo La may be the highest asphalted road in the world. Khardung La was once thought to be the world record holder at 5,602 metres (18,379 ft); in reality, according to modern surveys, it measures 5,359 m (17,582 ft), 243 m (797 ft) less than previously thought.

== See also ==
- List of extreme points of China
