= Zhongba =

Zhongba may refer to the following places in China:

- Zhongba County (仲巴县) in Tibet
- Zhongba Township (中坝乡, lit. "Middle Dam") in Gansu
