= Jiesa Lake =

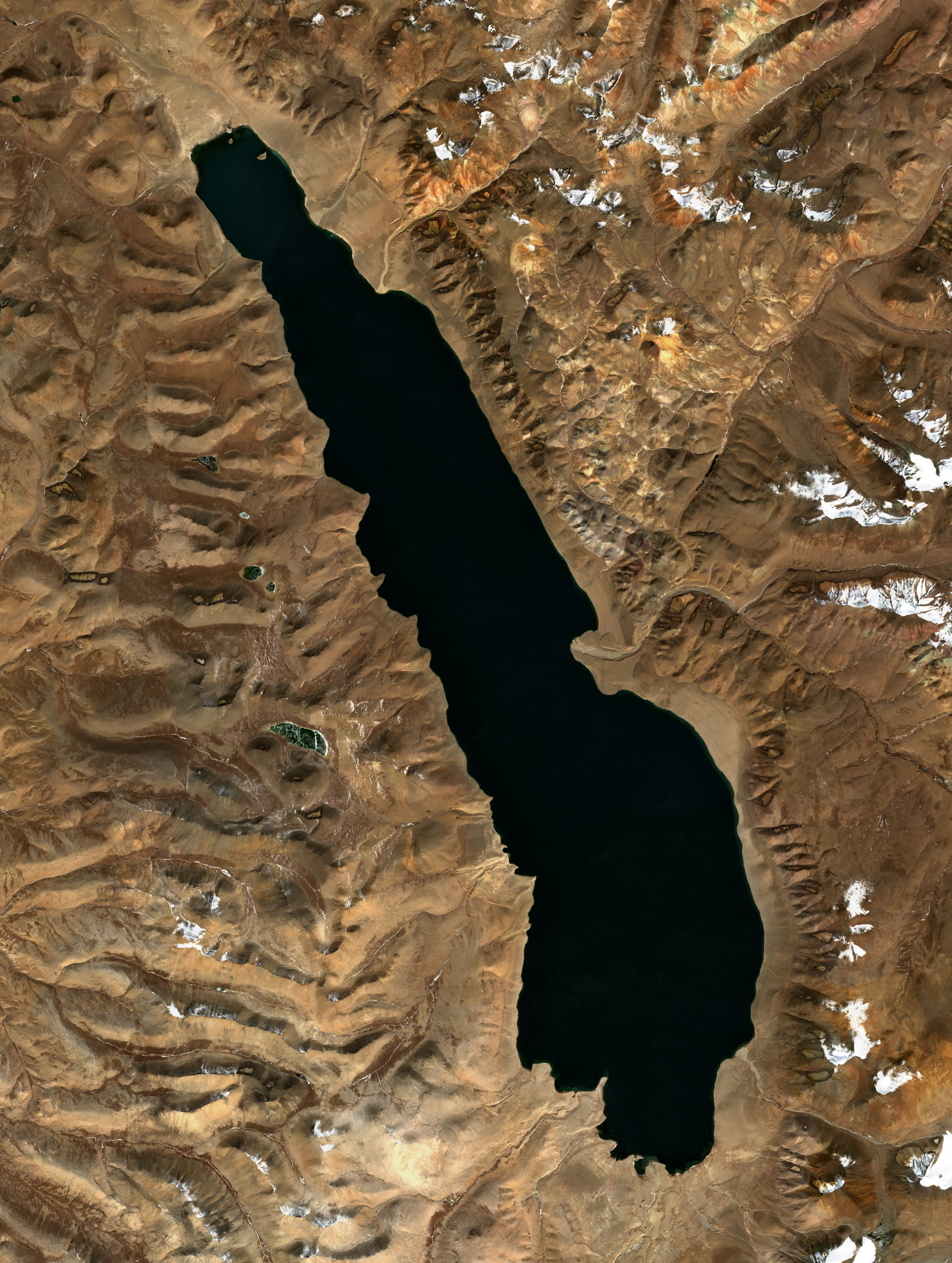
- Sentinel-2 image (2021)

- Location within Ngari
- Location: Coqên County, Ngari Prefecture, Tibet Autonomous Region, China
- Coordinates: 30°13′34″N 84°47′32″E
- Lake type: Freshwater lake
- Catchment area: 946 km^{2} (400 sq mi)
- Basin countries: China
- Max. length: 32.1 km (20 mi)
- Max. width: 7.2 km (4 mi)
- Surface area: 146.4 km^{2} (100 sq mi)
- Surface elevation: 5,201 m (17,064 ft)

Jiesa Lake (Chinese: 杰萨错; pinyin: Jiésà Cuò) or Gyesar Tso (Tibetan: སྒྱེ་གསར་མཚོ, Wylie: sgye gsar mtsho, ZWPY: Gyesar Tso) is a lake in Coqên County in the Ngari Prefecture of the Tibet Autonomous Region of China.

== Location ==
It is located southwest of Coqên Town. Fed by 27 small streams, it is 32.1 km long and 7.2 km wide and has an area of 146.4 square km.
