= Renqingxiubu Lake =

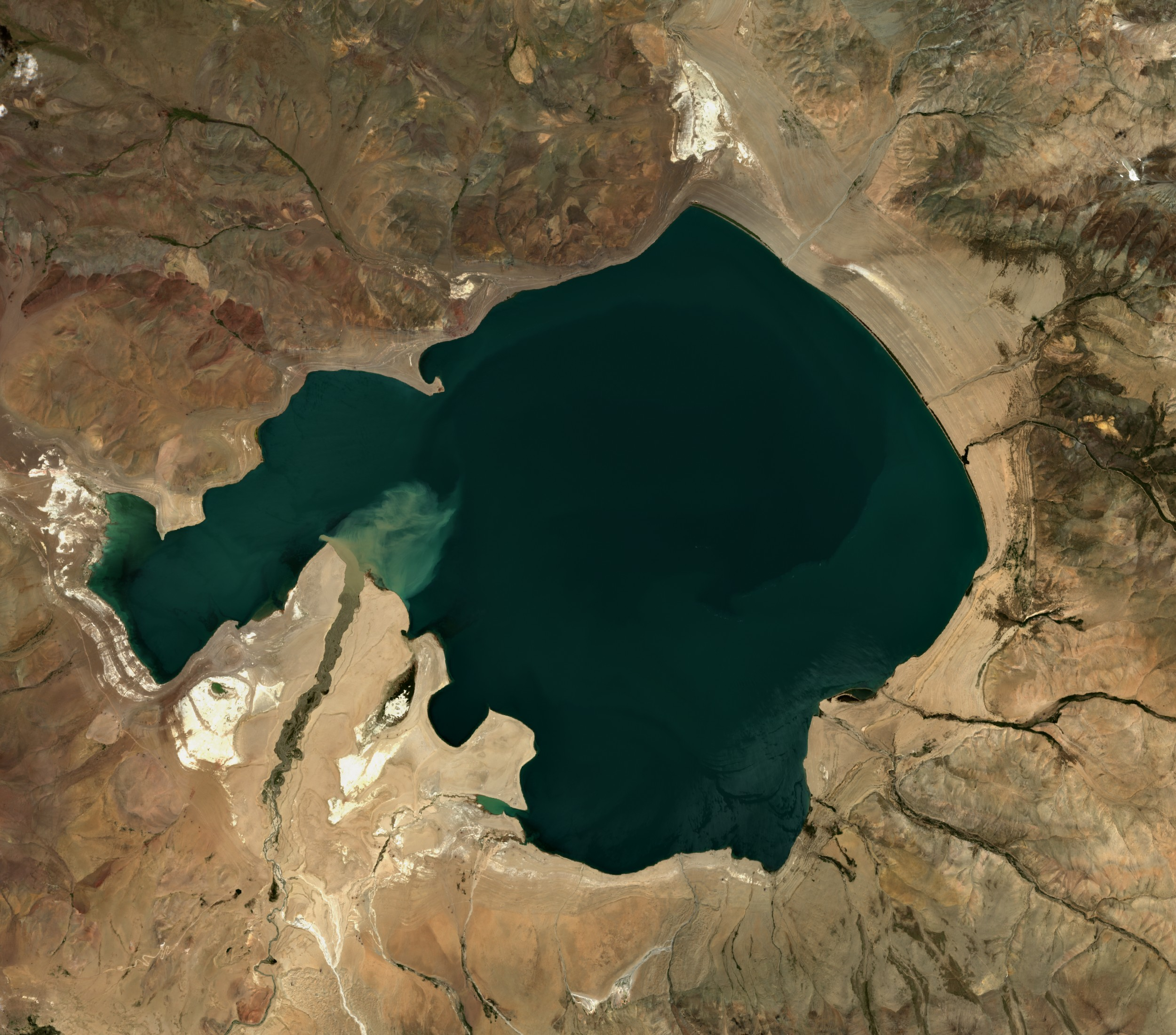
- Sentinel-2 image (2020)

- Location within Ngari
- Location: Zhongba County, Shigatse Prefecture, Tibet Autonomous Region, China
- Coordinates: 31°16′58″N 83°27′19″E
- Lake type: Salt lake
- Catchment area: 2,369.9 km^{2} (900 sq mi)
- Basin countries: China
- Max. length: 21.5 km (13 mi)
- Max. width: 16.4 km (10 mi)
- Surface area: 187.1 km^{2} (100 sq mi)
- Surface elevation: 4,756 m (15,604 ft)

Renqingxiubu, or Renqingxiubucuo (Chinese: 仁青休布错; pinyin: Rénqīng Xiūbù Cuò), also known as Rinchen Shubtso (Tibetan: རིན་ཆེན་ཤུབས་མཚོ་, Wylie: rin chen shubs mtsho, ZWPY: Rinchen Shuptso), is a salt lake in Zhongba County in the Shigatse Prefecture of the Tibet Autonomous Region of China. It is located about 45 kilometres northwest of Taruo Lake and southeast of Ang Laren Lake. It is 21.5 km long and 16.4 km wide and has an area of 187.1 square km.
