= Palongcuo =

Freshwater lake in Tibet, China

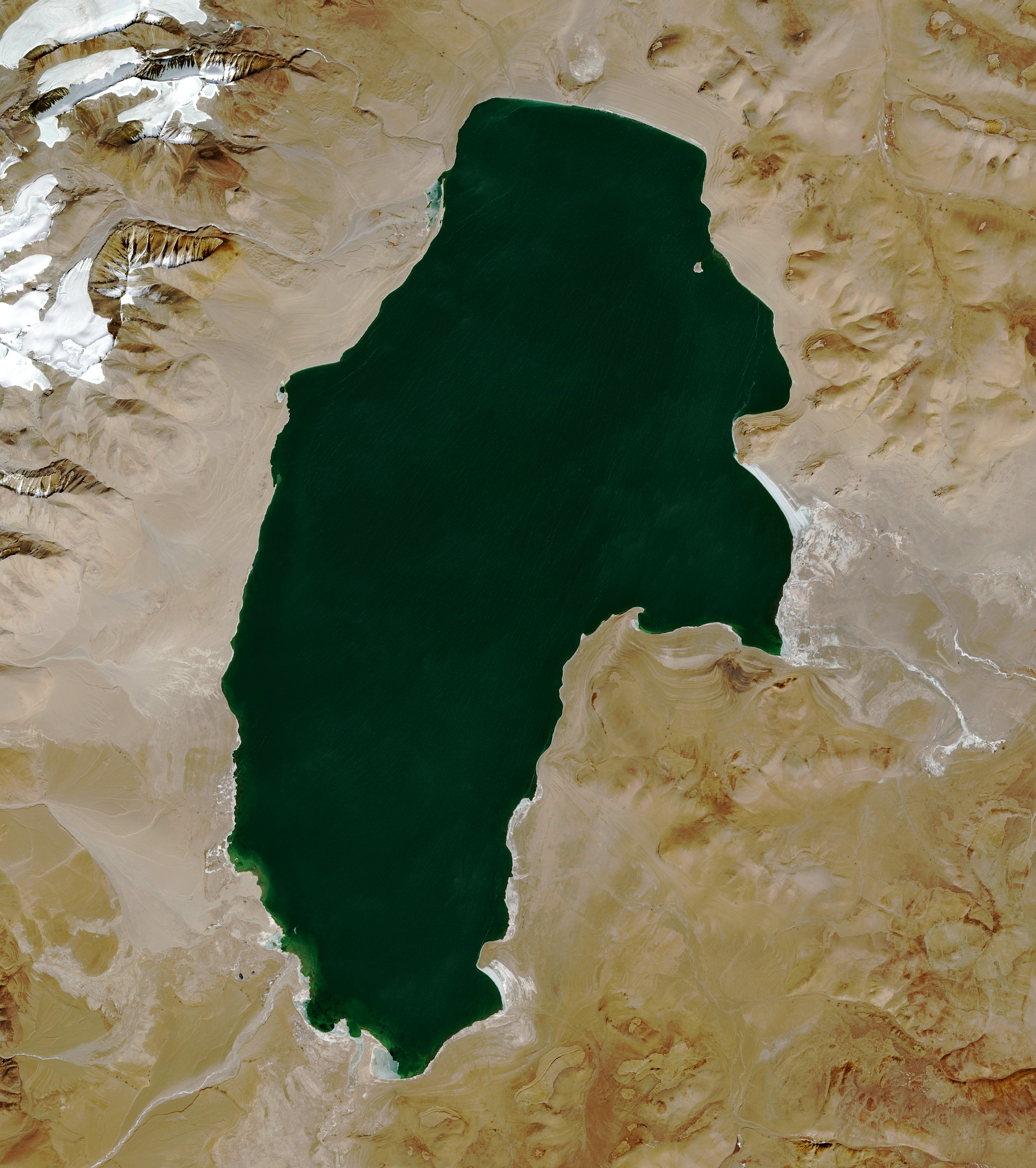
- Sentinel-2 image (2021)

- Location within Tibet
- Location: Zhongba County, Tibet, China
- Coordinates: 30°54′3.6″N 83°36′3.6″E
- Surface area: 141.33 km^{2} (54.57 sq mi)
- Surface elevation: 5,101 m (16,736 ft)
- Frozen: Winter

Palongcuo or Palung Co (Chinese: 帕龙错; pinyin: palong cuò) is a high-altitude saltwater lake in Zhongba County in the Tibet region of China.

== Location ==
The lake in located at 5,101 m (16,736 ft) above sea level at Qinghai-Tibet plateau, about 740 kilometers west of the regional capital Lhasa. The area around Palungcuo mainly consists of grasslands as natural pasture. It stretches 20.4 kilometers in a north-south direction and 12.1 kilometers in an east-west direction.

The lake is the southern end point of Palongcuo-Cangmucuo Fault Zone.

== Flora and fauna ==
In 2008, for the first time a snow leopard was spotted in the southern grassland of the lake.
