= Dawa (given name) =

Dawa (Tibetan: ཟླ་བ, Wylie: zla wa; also written Tibetan: ཟླ་བ, Wylie: zla ba) is a Tibetan and Sherpa given name.

The word Dawa means "moon" or "month" in Tibetan. It is often used as a name for children born on a Monday. The name can be given to either a girl or a boy. Other people in the Himalayan region such as the Ladakhis, the Sikkimese of Northeast India and the Bhutanese people also use the name Dawa in the same sense as the Tibetans.

Notable people with this name include:

== Sportspeople ==
- Pasang Dawa Lama (1912–1982), Nepalese mountaineer
- Dawa Dachhiri Sherpa (born 1969), Nepalese cross-country skier
- Chhang Dawa Sherpa (born 1982), Nepalese mountaineer
- Dawa Steven Sherpa (born 1984), Nepalese mountaineer
- Dawa Tshering (born 1985), Bhutanese football midfielder
- Dawa Gyeltshen (born 1986), Bhutanese football defender
- Dawa Yangzum Sherpa (born 1990), Nepalese mountaineer
- Lungtok Dawa (born 1998), Bhutanese football forward

== Others ==
- Dawa Sangpo (fl. 9th century BC?), king of Shambala
- Dawa Gyaltsen (fl. 8th century), Dzogchen Buddhist master who lived in Zhangzhung
- Kazi Dawa Samdup (1868–1922), Indian translator of Tibetan Buddhist works
- Dawa Narbula (born 1935), Indian politician, member of the Lok Sabha for Darjeeling, West Bengal
- Dawa Tsering (born 1935), Bhutanese politician, Minister of Foreign Affairs in the 1980s–1990s
- Tashi Dawa (born 1959), Chinese writer
- Alan Dawa Dolma (born 1987), Chinese singer

== See also ==
- Dawa Lake, lake in Coqên County, Ngari Prefecture, Tibet Autonomous Region, China
