= Dawa (surname) =

Dawa is a surname. Notable people with the surname include:

- Biola Dawa (born 2000), Australian rugby union player
- Joyskim Dawa (born 1996), Cameroonian footballer
- Lungtok Dawa (born 1998), Bhutanese footballer
- Mary Dawa, South Sudanese footballer
- Tashi Dawa (born 1959), Chinese novelist
