= Lunggar Township =

Township in Tibet, China

Coordinates: 31°10′N 84°00′E

Lunggar Township is a small settlement in Zhongba County of Shigatse Prefecture, part of the Tibet Autonomous Region in China.

== See also ==
- List of towns and villages in Tibet
