= Ro'gyog Township =

Township in Tibet, China

Coordinates: 29°42′N 84°52′E

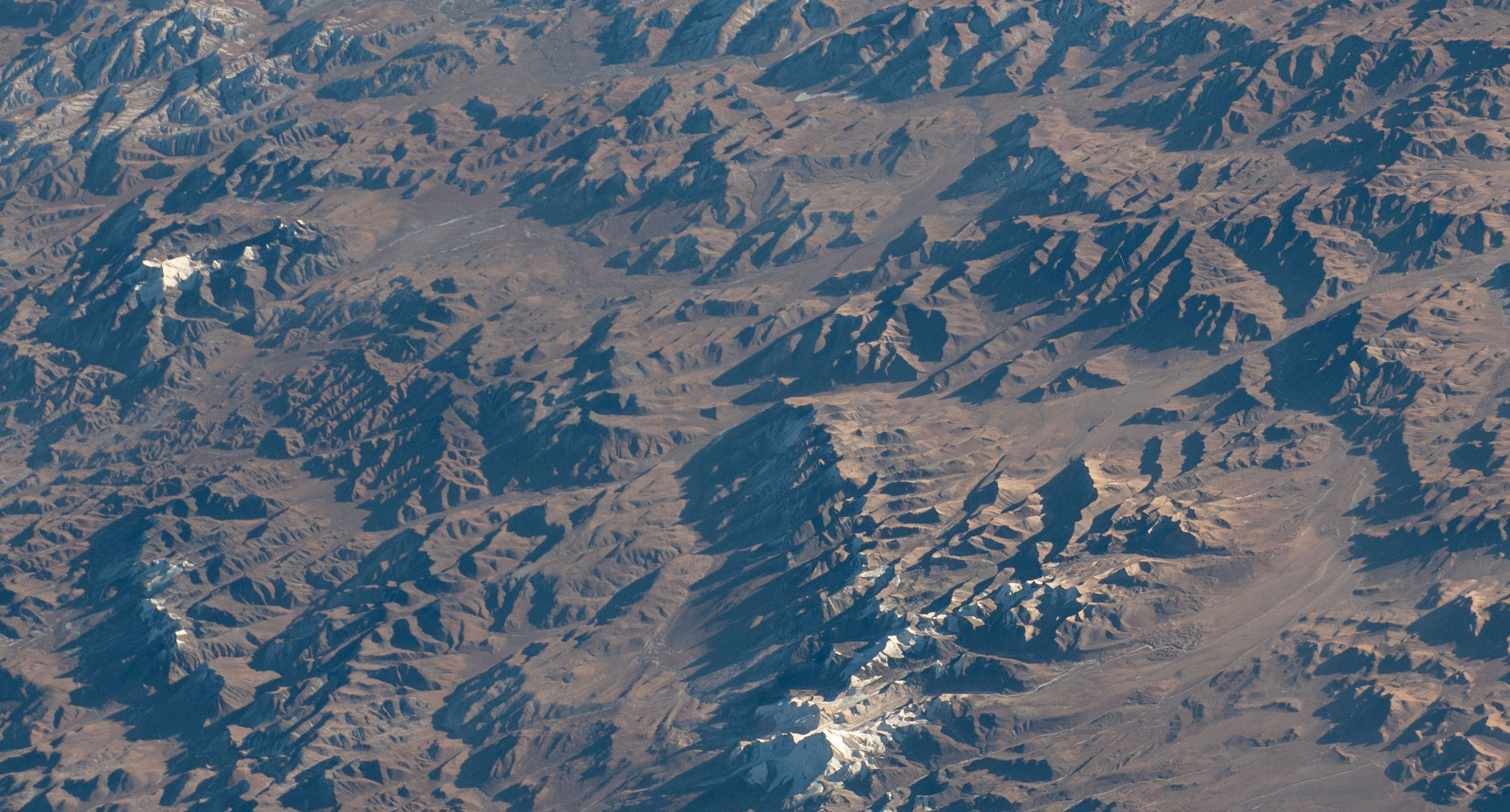
Landscape around of Ru'gyog with Saga County Glacier Peak (Transhimalaya), river Naxiong Zangbo, a side river of Yarlung Tsangpo and Loinbo Kangri mountains

Ru’gyog is a village and township in the Tibet Autonomous Region of China.

== See also ==
- List of towns and villages in Tibet
