= Zhari Namco =

Lake in Tibet

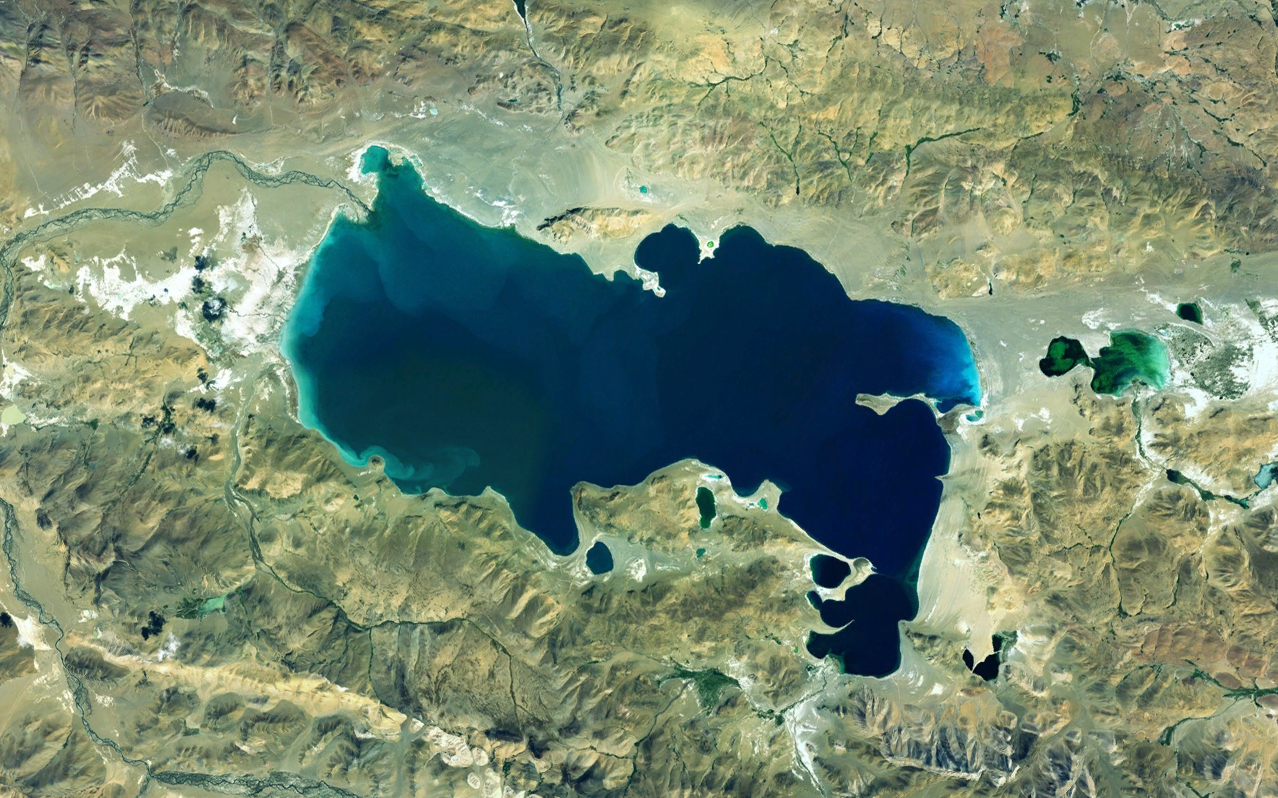
- Satellite Image of Zhari Namco

- Location within Tibet
- Coordinates: 30°55′N 85°38′E
- Type: Endorheic, Saline, Permanent, Natural
- Primary inflows: Cuoqin Zangbu, Dalong Zangbu
- Catchment area: 15,433.2 km^{2} (5,958.8 sq mi)
- Basin countries: China
- Max. length: 54.3 km (34 mi)
- Max. width: 26.2 km (16 mi)
- Surface area: 996.9 km^{2} (400 sq mi)
- Shore length^{1}: 183 km (100 mi)
- Surface elevation: 4,613 m (15,135 ft)

Ramsar Wetland
- Official name: Tibet Trari Nam Co Wetlands
- Designated: 3 February 2020
- Reference no.: 2430
- ^{1} Shore length is not a well-defined measure.

Zhari Namco or Zhari Nanmu or Lake Trari Nam (Tibetan: བཀྲ་རི་གནམ་མཚོ, Wylie: bkra ri gnam mtsho, Chinese: 扎日南木错) is a salt lake in Tibet, China. It is bounded on the west by Coqên County of Ngari Prefecture, and on the east by Ngamring County of Shigatse Prefecture. Zhari Namco is 996.9 square kilometres (384.9 sq mi), with a drainage area of 15,433.2 square kilometres (5,958.8 sq mi), an elevation of 4,613 metres (15,135 ft), length 54.3 kilometres (33.7 mi) and mean width 18.36 kilometres (11.41 mi) (maximum width 26.2 kilometres [16.3 mi]). It is located east of Coqên Town in southern Tibet.

== Climate ==
Climate data for Zhari Namco
Month	Jan	Feb	Mar	Apr	May	Jun	Jul	Aug	Sep	Oct	Nov	Dec	Year
Mean daily maximum °C (°F)	−2.7 (27.1)	−1.0 (30.2)	2.2 (36.0)	7.1 (44.8)	10.9 (51.6)	14.9 (58.8)	14.7 (58.5)	13.9 (57.0)	12.0 (53.6)	7.3 (45.1)	1.2 (34.2)	−1.3 (29.7)	6.6 (43.9)
Daily mean °C (°F)	−9.7 (14.5)	−8.1 (17.4)	−4.4 (24.1)	−0.5 (31.1)	3.1 (37.6)	7.6 (45.7)	8.8 (47.8)	8.3 (46.9)	5.7 (42.3)	−0.1 (31.8)	−5.8 (21.6)	−8.4 (16.9)	−0.3 (31.5)
Mean daily minimum °C (°F)	−16.7 (1.9)	−15.2 (4.6)	−10.9 (12.4)	−8.1 (17.4)	−4.7 (23.5)	0.4 (32.7)	2.9 (37.2)	2.7 (36.9)	−0.5 (31.1)	−7.4 (18.7)	−12.7 (9.1)	−15.5 (4.1)	−7.1 (19.1)
Average precipitation mm (inches)	13 (0.5)	8 (0.3)	15 (0.6)	11 (0.4)	8 (0.3)	15 (0.6)	53 (2.1)	59 (2.3)	24 (0.9)	10 (0.4)	1 (0.0)	5 (0.2)	222 (8.6)
Source: Climate-Data.org

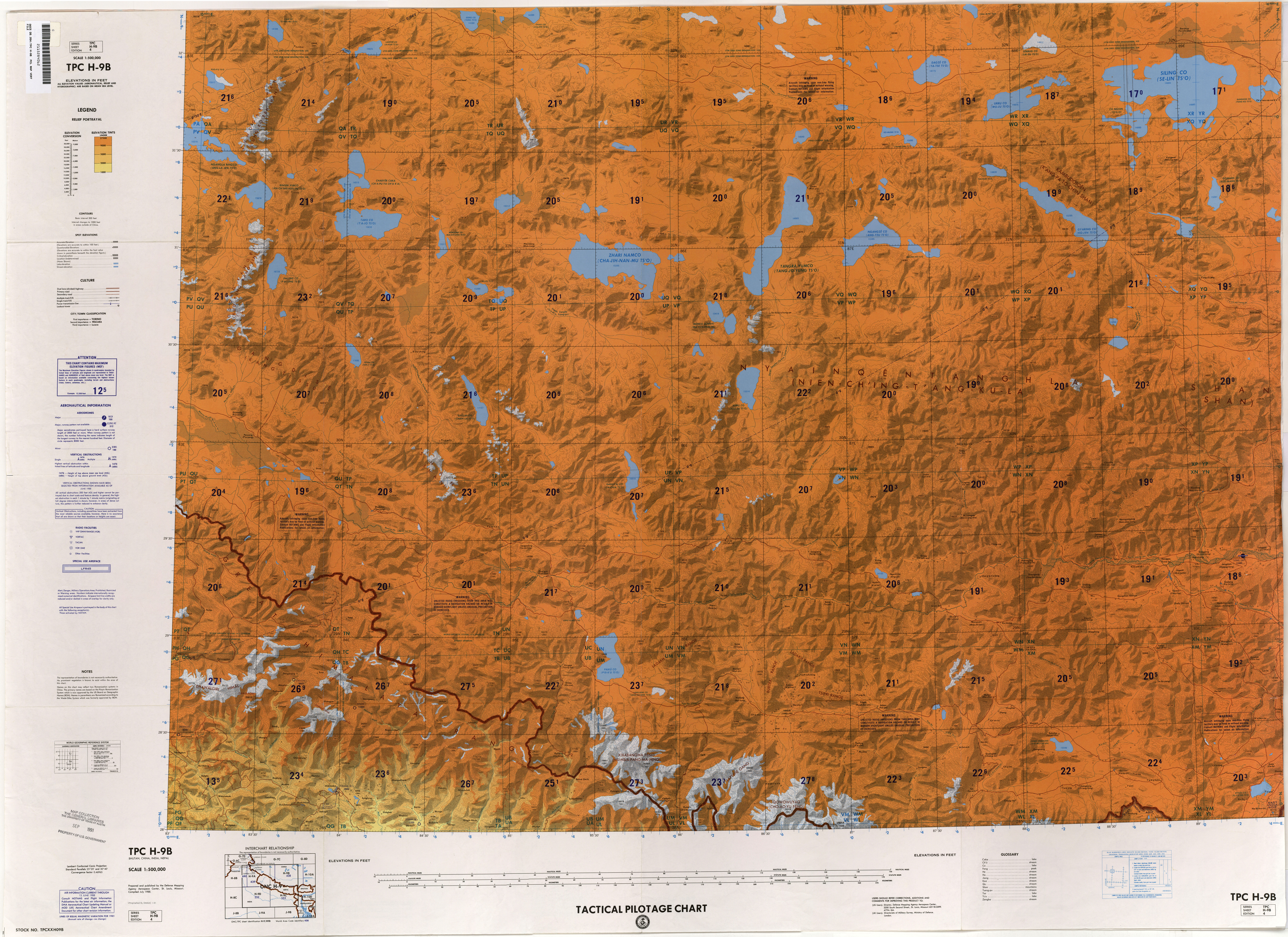
Map including Zhari Namco
