= Dawa Lake =

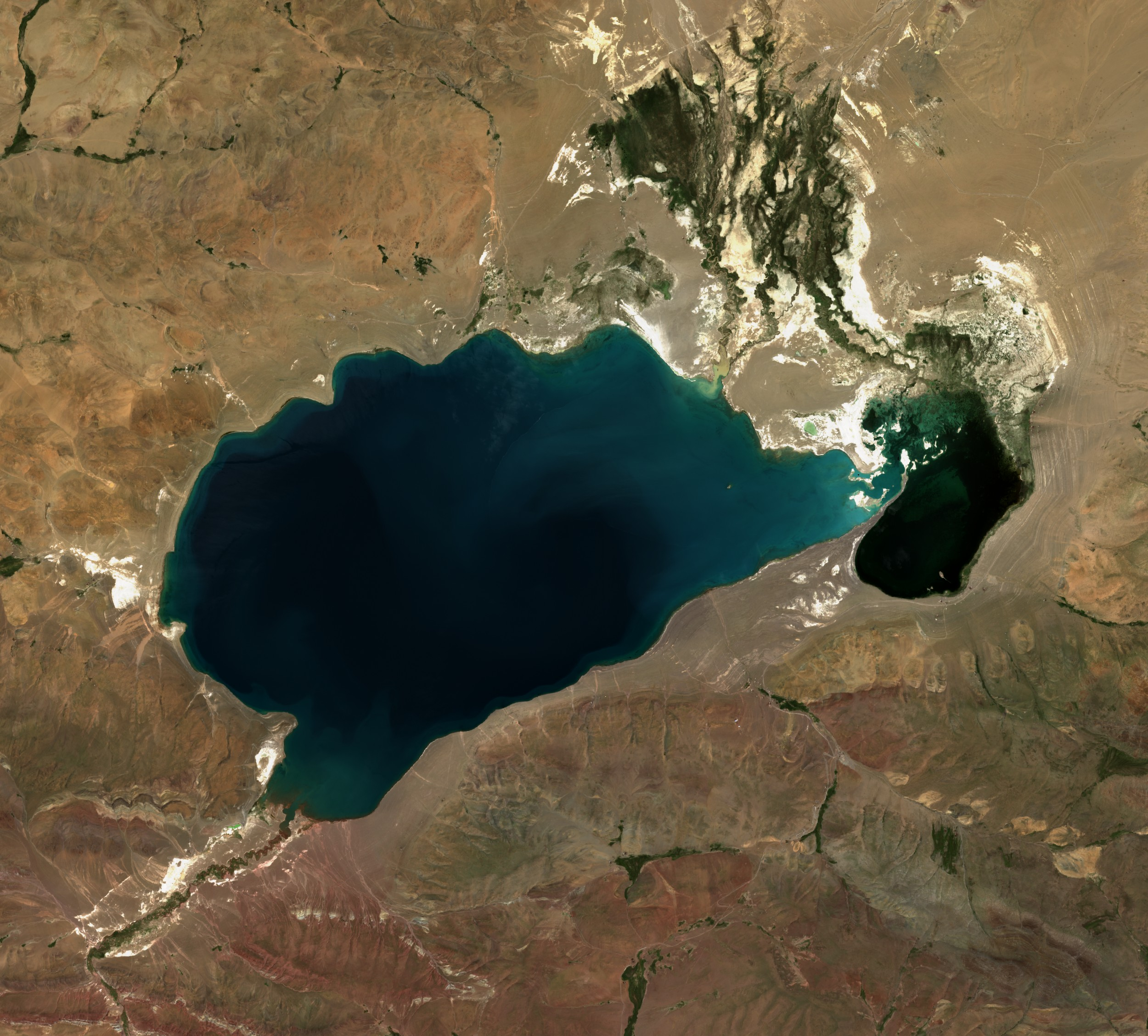
- Sentinel-2 image (2021)

- Location within Ngari
- Location: Coqên County, Ngari Prefecture, Tibet Autonomous Region, China
- Coordinates: 31°14′40″N 84°57′15″E
- Lake type: Salt lake
- Catchment area: 2,419.6 km^{2} (930 sq mi)
- Basin countries: China
- Max. length: 16.5 km (10 mi)
- Max. width: 11.4 km (7 mi)
- Surface area: 114.4 km^{2} (0 sq mi)
- Surface elevation: 4,626 m (15,177 ft)

Dawa (Tibetan: ཟླ་བ་མཚོ, Wylie: zla ba mtsho; Chinese: 达瓦措; pinyin: Dáwǎ Cuò), or Dawacuo, is a lake in Coqên County in the Ngari Prefecture of the Tibet Autonomous Region of China. It is located several kilometres northwest of Coqên Town. Daxiong is a village located beyond its northeastern bank. The name of lake means "Moon Lake" in Tibetan language.
