= Ngangla Rinco =

Nganglha Ringtso
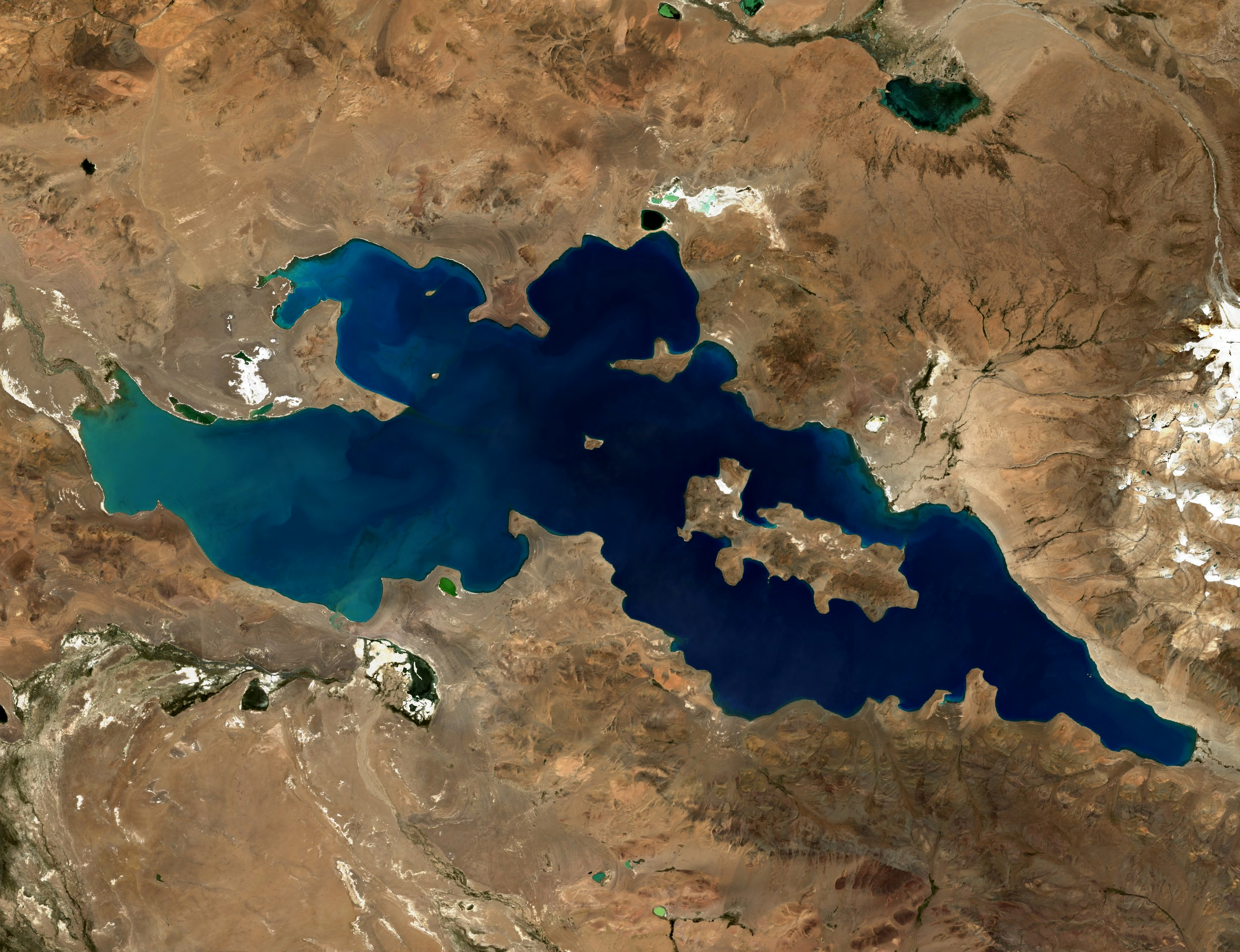
- Sentinel-2 image (2020)

- Location within Ngari
- Location: Zhongba and Gêrzê counties, Tibet Autonomous Region, China
- Coordinates: 31°33′6″N 83°6′2″E
- Type: Salt lake
- Catchment area: 10.983 km^{2} (0 sq mi)
- Basin countries: China
- Max. length: 56.5 km (35 mi)
- Max. width: 17.9 km (11 mi)
- Surface area: 512.7 km^{2} (200 sq mi)
- Surface elevation: 4,715 m (15,469 ft)

Ngangla Rinco (Tibetan: ངང་ལྷ་རིང་མཚོ, Wylie: ngang lha ring mtsho; Chinese: 昂拉仁错; pinyin: Áng Lārén Cuò), Nganglha Ringtso Lake, or Ang Laren Lake, is a salt lake in Zhongba and Gêrzê counties of the Tibet Autonomous Region of China. It is located northwest of Renqingxiubu Lake and contains at least 4 islands, the largest of which is about 10 kilometres in length.

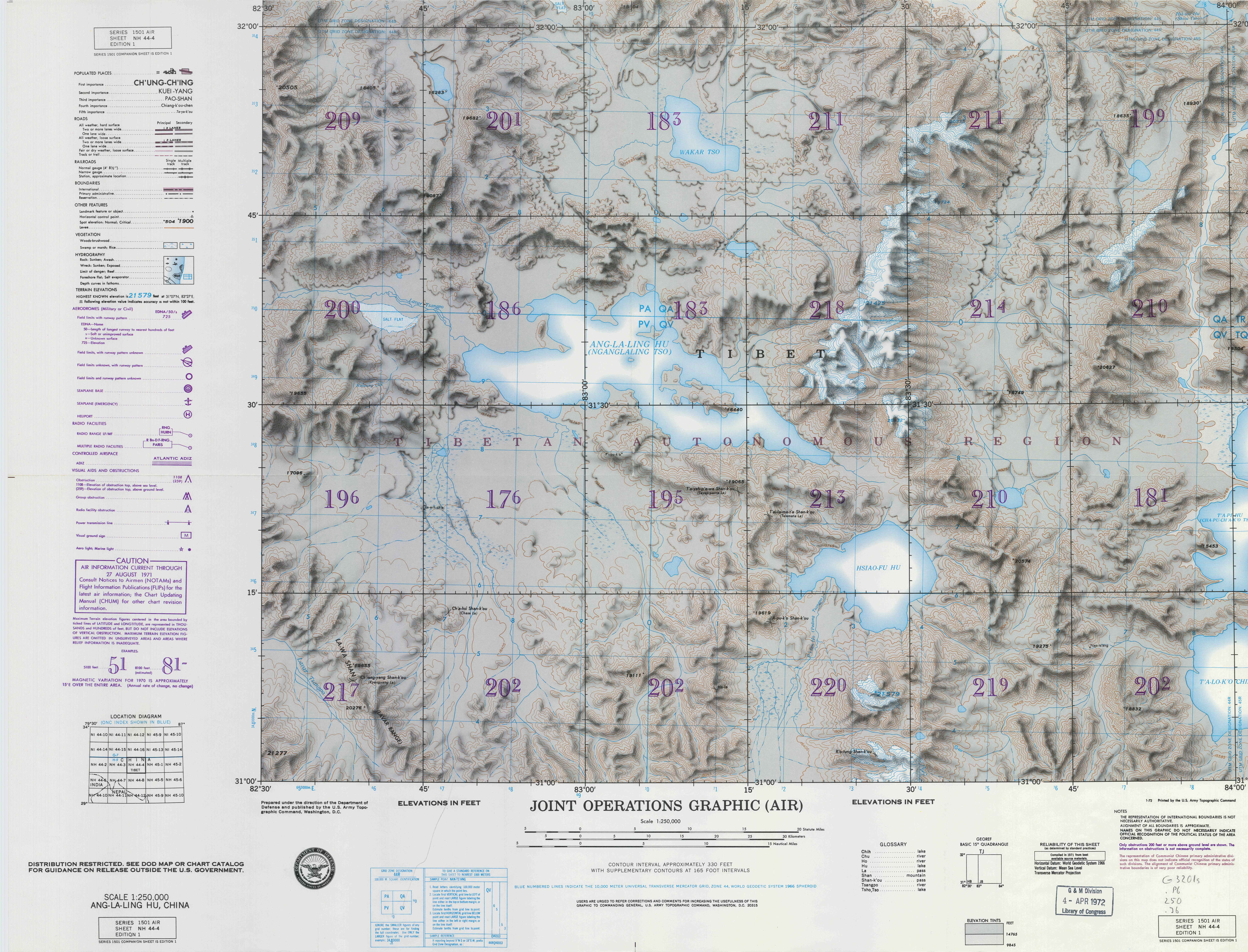
Map including Ang Laren Lake (labeled as ANG-LA-LING HU (NGANGLALING TSO)) (ATC, 1971)
