= Parjang Township =

Pama བར་མ་
- Township
- Location within Tibet
- Coordinates: 31°18′19″N 84°7′32″E
- Country: China
- Region: Tibet
- Prefecture: Shigatse Prefecture
- County: Zhongba County

Area
  - Total: 4,098 km^{2} (1,582 sq mi)

Population
  - Major Nationalities: Tibetan
  - Regional dialect: Tibetan language
- Time zone: +8

Barma (Tibetan: བར་མ་), or Pama (Chinese: 帕玛乡), Pamaxiang, also spelled Parma or Jarma) is a small town and township-level division in Zhongba County in the Shigatse Prefecture of the Tibet Autonomous Region of China. It is located roughly 500 kilometres (310 mi) northwest of Lhasa next to Chabyer Co lake, north of Taro Co. The township was established in 1961 and covers an area of 4,098 square kilometres (1,582 sq mi).

== See also ==
- List of towns and villages in Tibet
