= Taruo Lake =

Lake of China

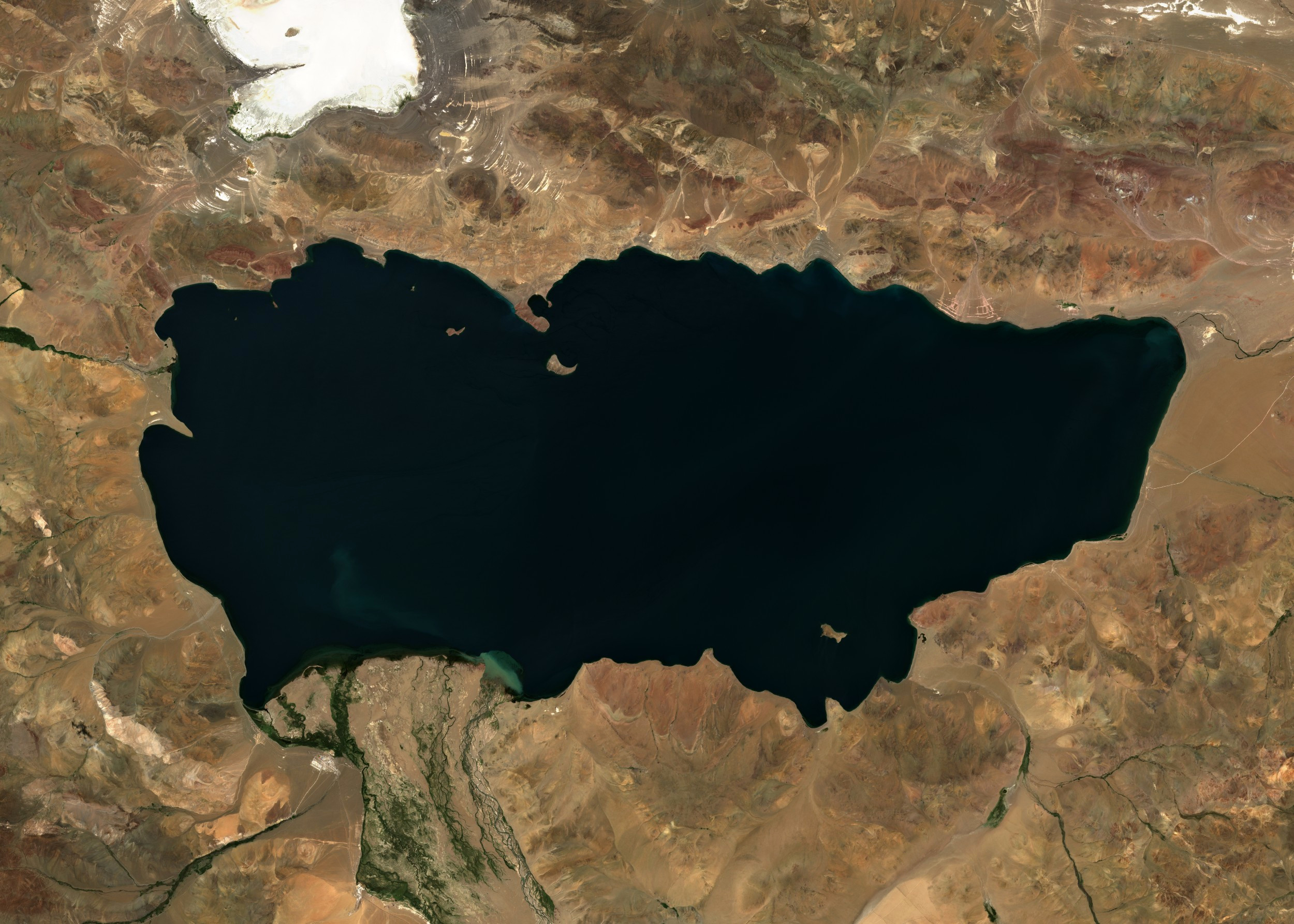
- Sentinel-2 image (2021)

- Location within Ngari
- Location: Zhongba County, Shigatse Prefecture, Tibet Autonomous Region, China
- Coordinates: 31°8′N 84°7′E
- Catchment area: 6,929.4 km^{2} (2,700 sq mi)
- Basin countries: China
- Max. length: 38.1 km (24 mi)
- Max. width: 17.2 km (11 mi)
- Surface area: 486.6 km^{2} (200 sq mi)
- Surface elevation: 4,566 m (14,980 ft)

Taruo Lake or Taruocuo (Chinese: 塔若错; pinyin: Tǎruò Cuò), also known as Taro Tso (Tibetan: ཐ་རོ་མཚོ་, Wylie: tha ro mtsho, ZWPY: Taro Tso) is a lake in Zhongba County in the Shigatse Prefecture of the Tibet Autonomous Region of China. It is located about 70 kilometres west of Coqên Town. It is 38.1 km long and 17.2 km wide and has an area of 486.6 square km.

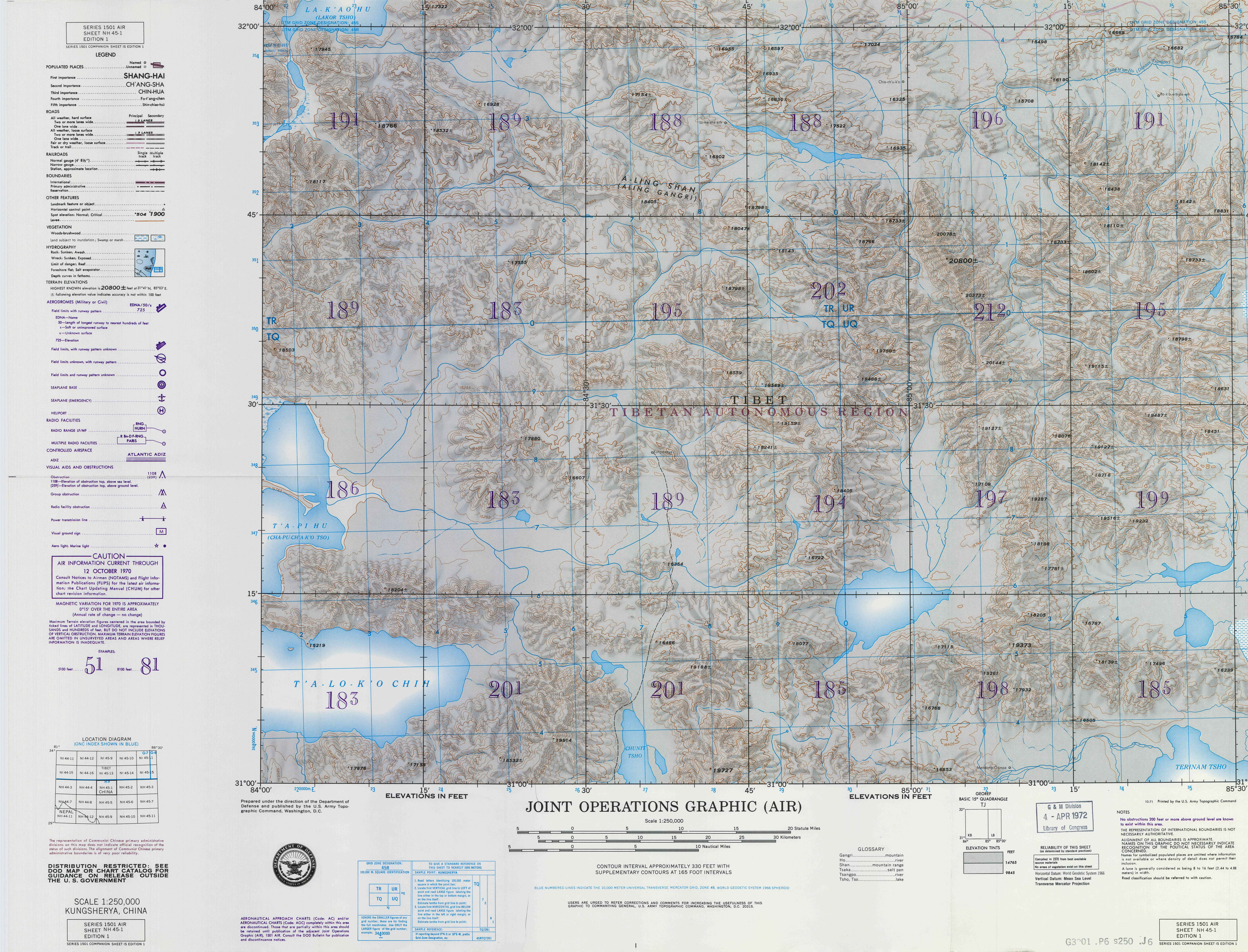
Map including most of Taruo Lake (labeled as T'A-LO-K'O CHIH) (ATC, 1970)
