= Saga, Tibet =

Saga
- Township

Tibetan transcription(s)

Chinese transcription(s)
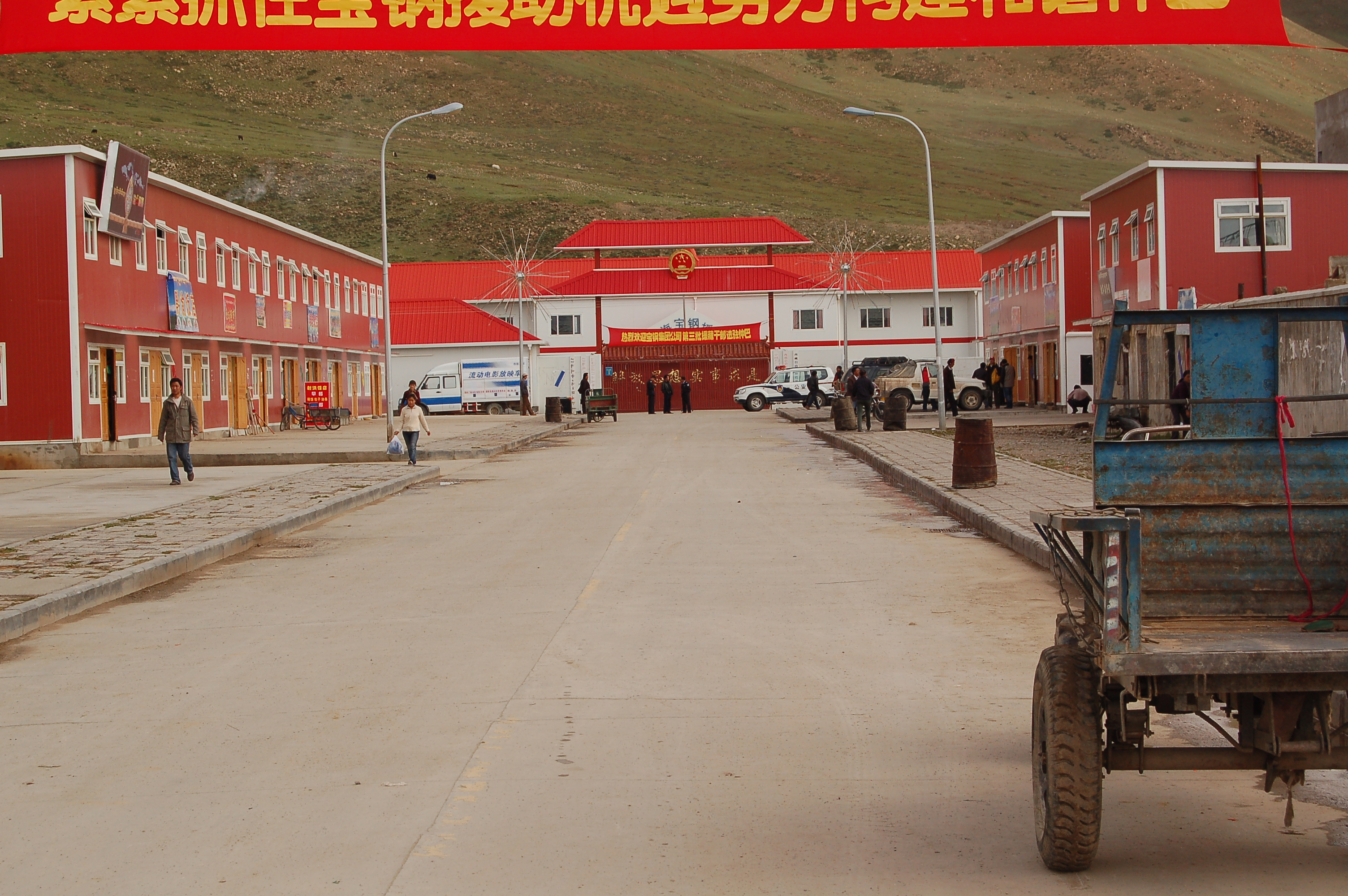
- Saga

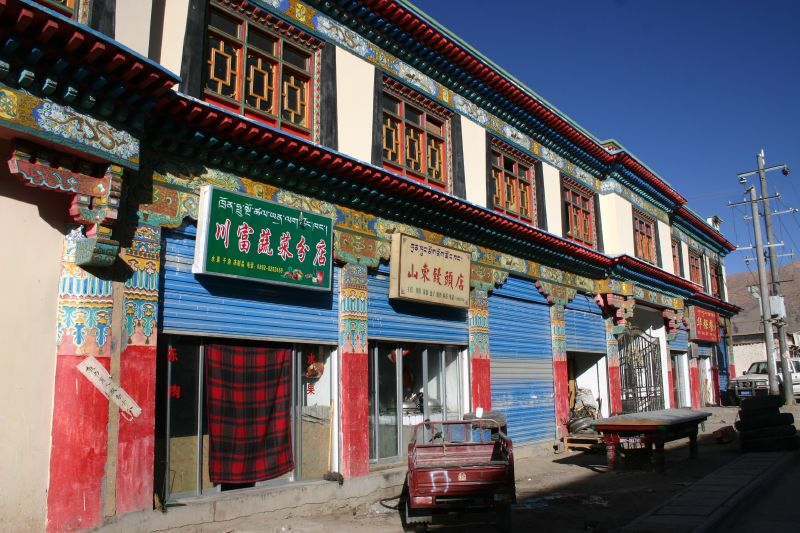

- Location within Tibet
- Coordinates: 29°19′48″N 85°13′56″E
- Country: China
- Province: Tibet Autonomous Region
- Prefecture: Shigatse Prefecture
- County: Saga County
- Elevation: 4,640 m (15,220 ft)
- Time zone: UTC+8 (CST)

Saga (Tibetan: Kyakyaru) is a town and township, and the seat of Saga County in Shigatse Prefecture, in southern Tibet. It lies at an altitude of 4,640 metres (15,223 ft).

== Description ==
Saga ("happy land") is an army town with a Chinese garrison which patrols the whole length of the Tibetan-Nepalese border (and often conducts target practice with machine guns very close to the town).

Saga straddles the Dargye Tsangpo river above its junction with the Brahmaputra River. It is strategically located at the junction of three roads - the Lhartse road coming from the east, the Dzongka road from the south and the Purang and Drongpa roads from the west. Saga is also an important stop-off point for pilgrims and tourists on the way to visiting Mount Kailash being the last town on the southern route with supplies for travellers, having both a store and a restaurant and several guest houses and hotels.
