= Lungtok Dawa =

Bhutanese association football player

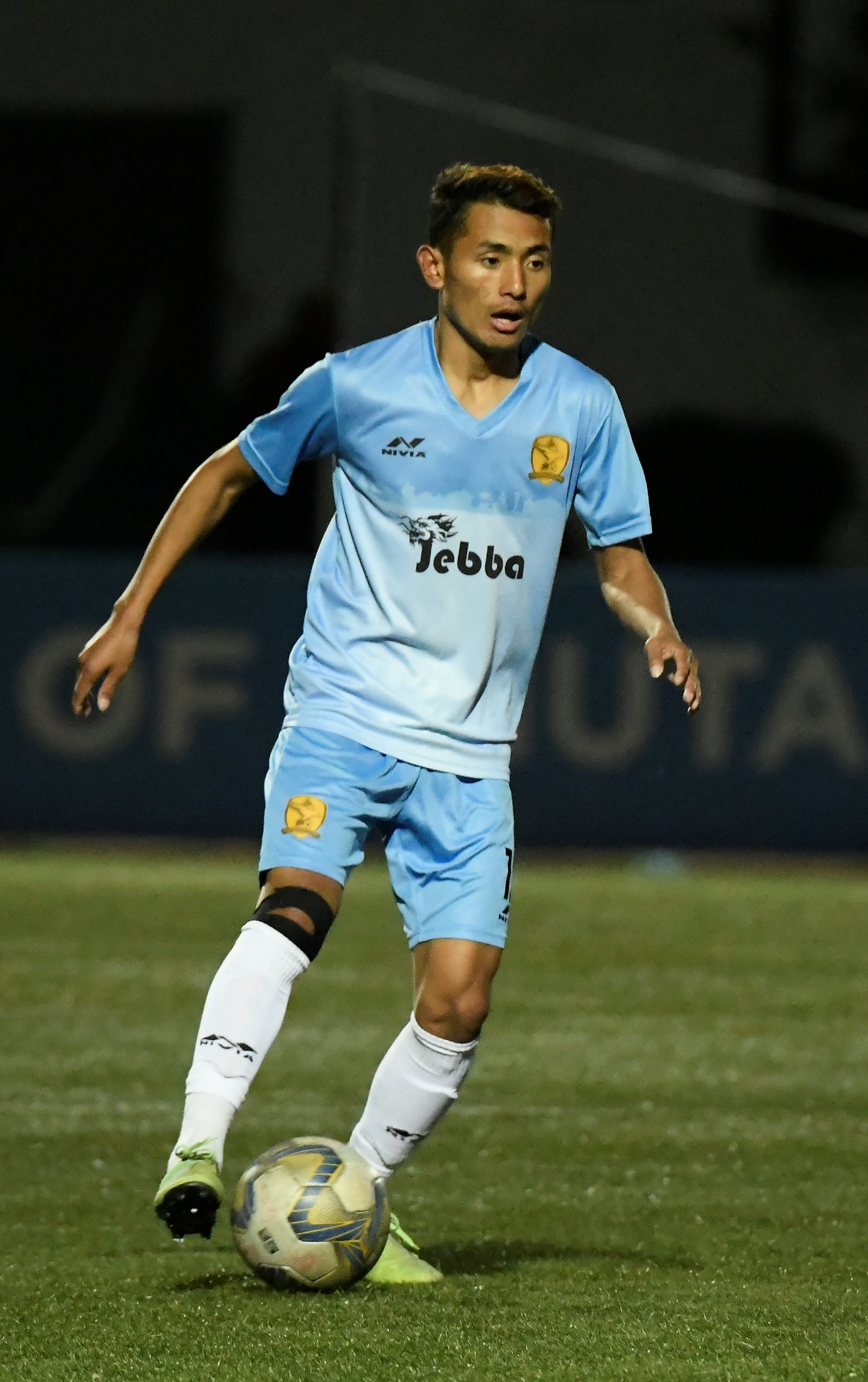

Personal information
- Full name: Lungtok Dawa
- Date of birth: 18 December 1998 (age 27)
- Place of birth: Bhutan
- Height: 1.67 m (5 ft 6 in)
- Position: Forward

Team information
- Current team: Transport United FC
- Number: 12

Senior career*
Years	Team	Apps	(Gls)
2015–2022	Thimphu City	2	(7)
2018–2019	Quartz FC		
2020–	Thimphu City		

International career
2015–	Bhutan	9	(1)
- * Club domestic league appearances and goals

Lungtok Dawa born on 18 December 1998 is a Bhutanese professional footballer who plays as a striker for Transport United and the Bhutan national team.

== Playing career ==
He made his first appearance for the Bhutan national football team in 2015 in their historic World Cup qualifying match against Sri Lanka. He also featured in a number of their second qualifying round matches and also featured in the 2015 SAFF Championship. Along with playing football he is also a college going student. Currently he is studying in Royal Thimphu College.
