= Saga County =

Saga County 萨嘎县 • ས་དགའ་རྫོང་། Saka
- County
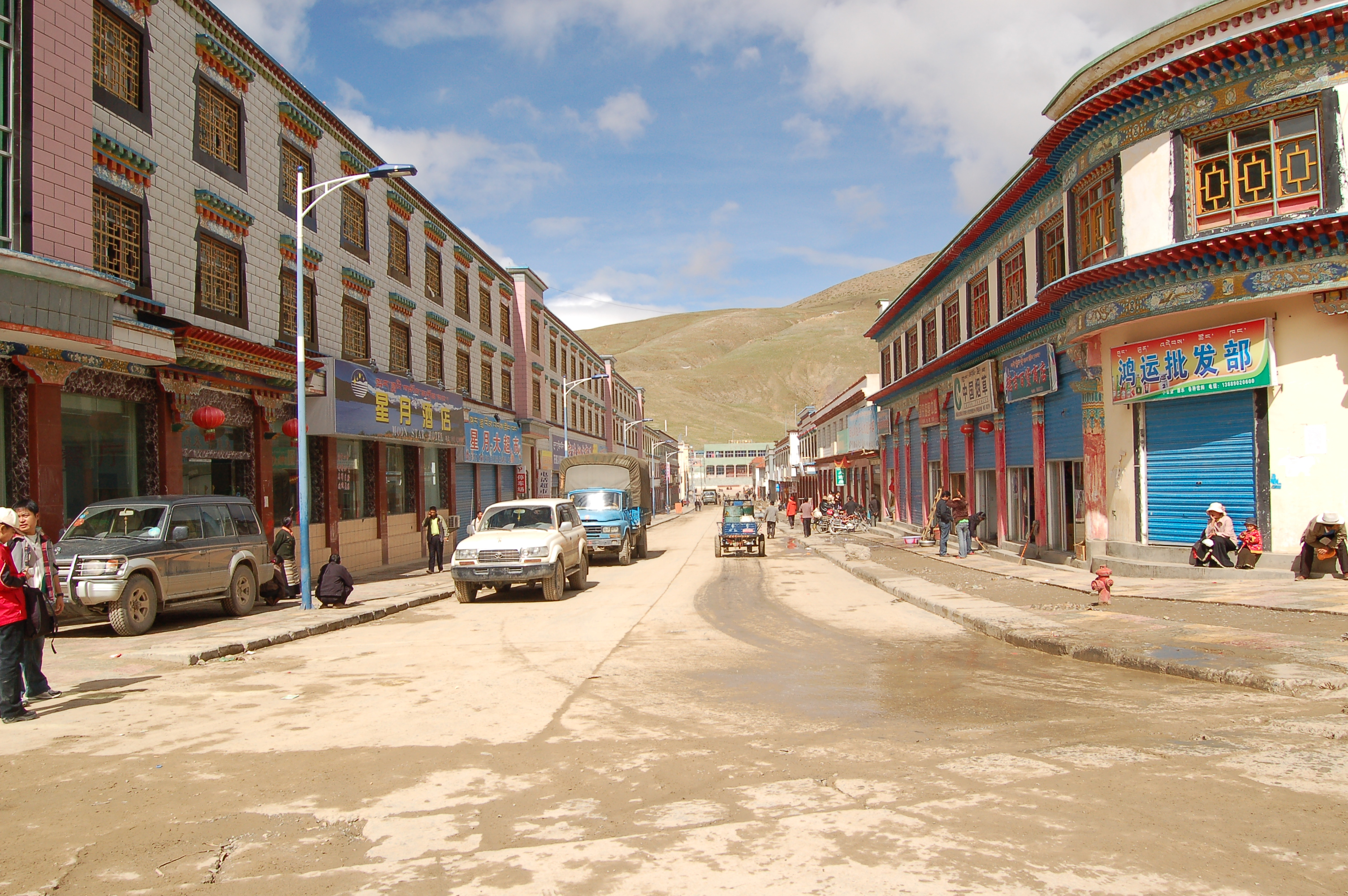
- Shopping area in Saga

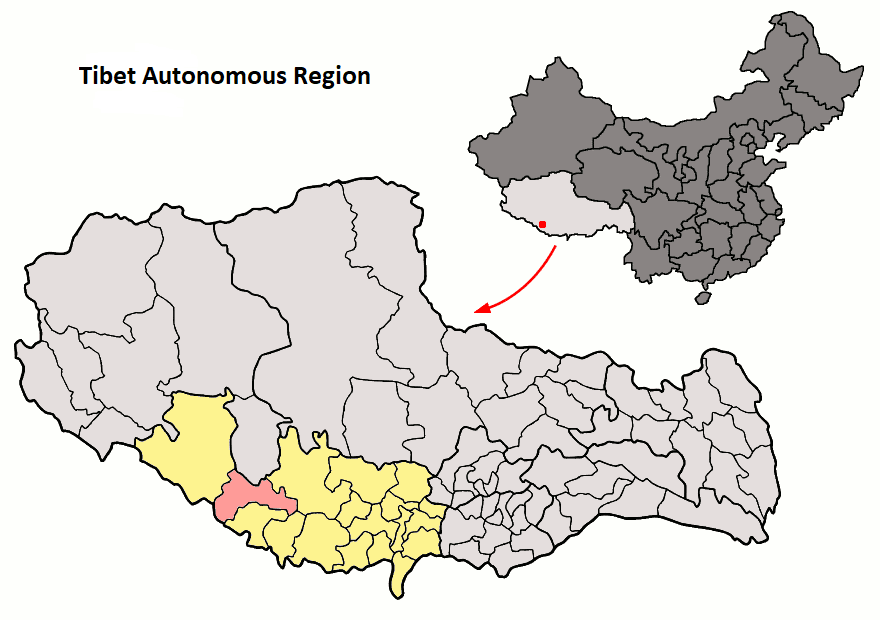
- Location of Saga County (red) within Shigatse City (yellow) and the Tibet AR

- Location of the seat in the Tibet AR Saga (China)
- Coordinates (Saga County government): 29°19′41″N 85°13′59″E
- Country: China
- Autonomous region: Tibet
- Prefecture-level city: Xigazê
- County seat: Gya'gya (Saga)

Area
  - Total: 12,418.87 km^{2} (4,794.95 sq mi)

Population (2020)
  - Total: 16,220
  - Density: 1.306/km^{2} (3.383/sq mi)
- Time zone: UTC+8 (China Standard)
- Website: www.sgx.gov.cn

Saga County

Chinese name
- Simplified Chinese: 萨嘎县
- Traditional Chinese: 薩嘎縣
Transcriptions
Standard Mandarin
- Hanyu Pinyin: Sàgā Xiàn

Tibetan name
- Tibetan: ས་དགའ་རྫོང་།
Transcriptions
- Wylie: sa dga' rdzong
- Tibetan Pinyin: Saga Zong

Saga County (Tibetan: ས་དགའ་རྫོང་།; Chinese: 萨嘎县) is a county of the prefecture-level city of Xigazê in the Tibet Autonomous Region, China, bordering Nepal to the west and southwest.

Dajia Lake and Jiesa Lake lies in the county.

== Administration divisions ==
Saga County is divided into 1 town and 7 townships.

Name	Chinese	Hanyu Pinyin	Tibetan	Wylie
Town
Gya'gya Town (Saga)	加加镇	Jiājiā zhèn	སྐྱ་སྐྱ་གྲོང་རྡལ།	skya skya grong rdal
Townships
Changgo Township	昌果乡	Chāngguǒ xiāng	འཕྲང་སྒོ་ཤང་།	'phrang sgo shang
Xungru Township	雄如乡	Xióngrú xiāng	གཞུང་རུ་ཤང་།	gzhung ru shang
Lhagcang Township	拉藏乡	Lāzàng xiāng	ལྷག་ཚང་ཤང་།	lhag tshang shang
Ru'gyog Township	如角乡	Rújiǎo xiāng	རུ་ཀྱོག་ཤང་།	ru kyog shang
Targyailing Township	达吉岭乡	Dájílǐng xiāng	དར་རྒྱས་གླིང་ཤང་།	dar rgyas gling shang
Dênggar Township	旦嘎乡	Dàngā xiāng	སྟེང་དཀར་ཤང་།	steng dkar shang
Xarru Township	夏如乡	Xiàrú xiāng	ཤར་རུ་ཤང་།	shar ru shang

== Transport ==
- China National Highway 219

== Gallery ==
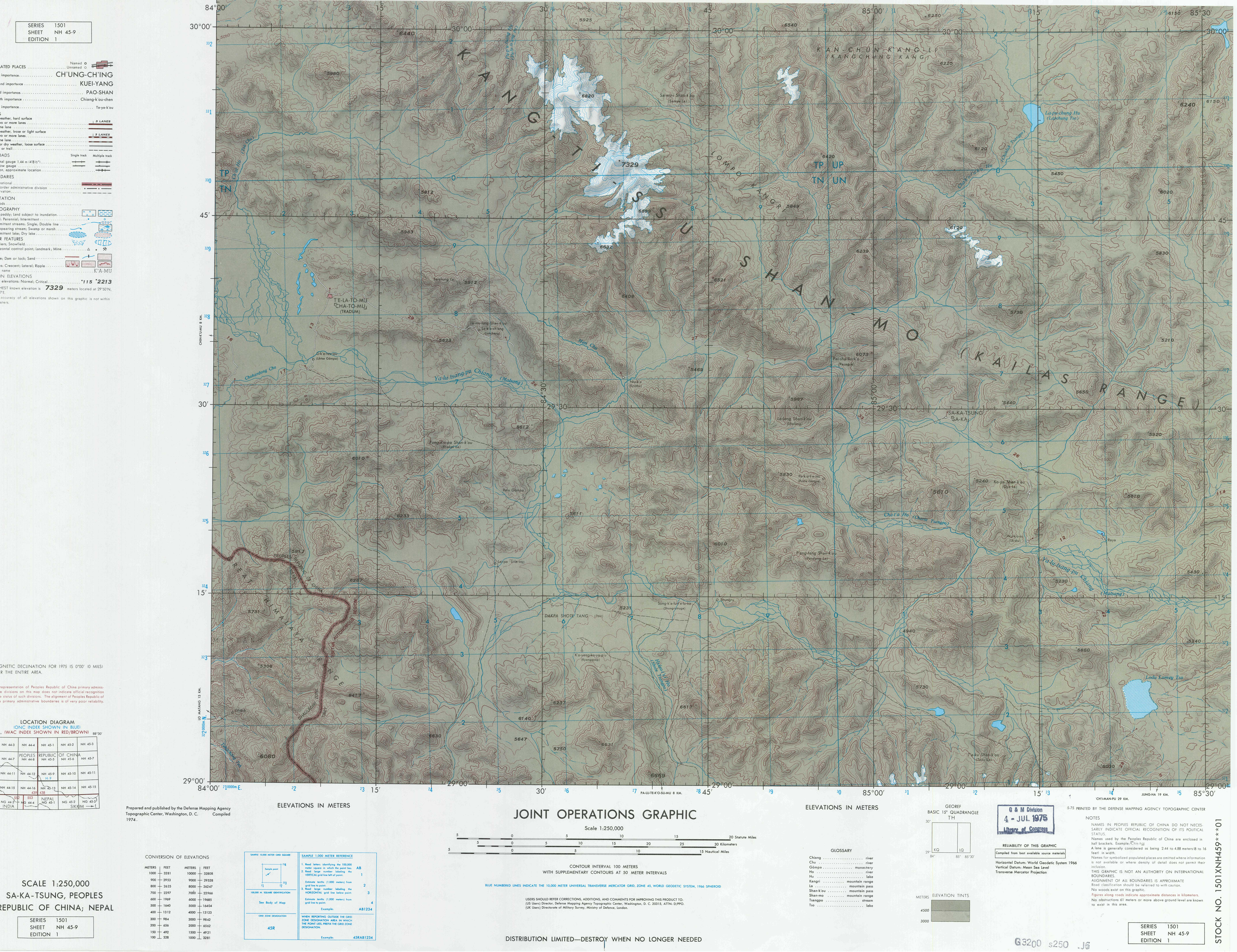
Map including part of western Saga County (DMA, 1974)
