= Zhongba County =

Zhongba County 仲巴县 • འབྲོང་པ་རྫོང་། Drongpa
- County
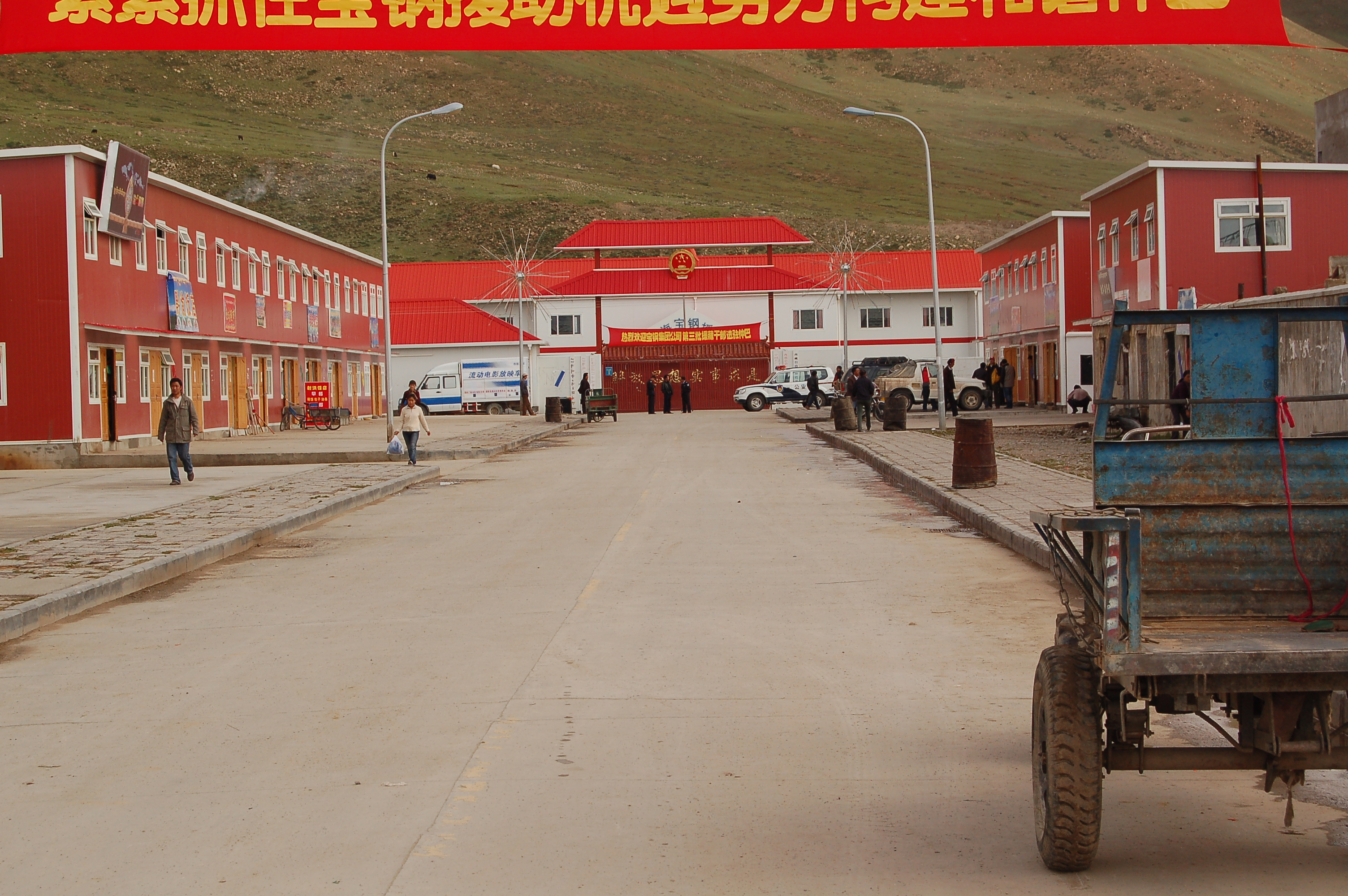

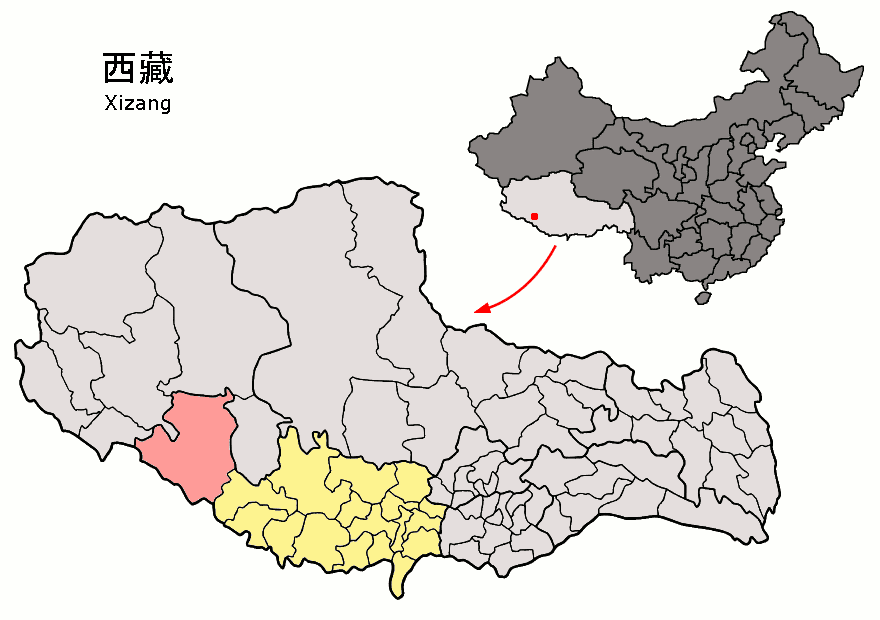
- Location of Zhongba County (red) in Xigazê City (yellow) and the Tibet A.R.

- Location of the seat in the Tibet A.R. Zhongba (China)
- Coordinates: 29°46′12″N 84°01′53″E
- Country: China
- Autonomous Region: Tibet
- Prefecture-level city: Shigatse
- County seat: Labrang (Drongpa)

Area
  - Total: 43,602.92 km^{2} (16,835.18 sq mi)

Population (2020)
  - Total: 26,897
  - Density: 0.61686/km^{2} (1.5977/sq mi)
- Time zone: UTC+8 (China Standard)
- Website: www.zbx.gov.cn

Zhongba County

Chinese name
- Simplified Chinese: 仲巴县
- Traditional Chinese: 仲巴縣
Transcriptions
Standard Mandarin
- Hanyu Pinyin: Zhòngbā Xiàn

Tibetan name
- Tibetan: འབྲོང་པ་རྫོང་།
Transcriptions
- Wylie: 'brong pa rdzong
- Tibetan Pinyin: Zhongba Zong

Drongpa County or Zhongba County (Tibetan: འབྲོང་པ་རྫོང; Chinese: 仲巴县) is a county of Shigatse Prefecture in China's Tibet Autonomous Region. Located in the western part of Central Tibet (sometimes referred to as "western Tibet"), it is the birthplace of the Tsangpo River (Brahmaputra). Zhongba is said to mean "place of wild yaks" in Tibetan. The county seat is at Labrang, which is also called the "Drongpa Township".

== Geography ==
Drongpa County is the largest county in the Shigatse Prefecture by geographical area. It has a population of approximately 18,000 and covers 43,594 square kilometers. It is prone to earthquakes and suffered a large one, 6.8 on the Richter scale, on 30 August 2008. Although the temblor left a 10 km (6.2 mi) north-south crack at the epicenter located at 31° north and 83.6° east, and houses were damaged and roads blocked by falling rocks, there were no reported injuries. The county is dotted with lakes such as Taro Tso, Nganglha Ringtso and Rinchen Shubtso.

Drongpa County shares the Tibet Autonomous Region's southern border with most of western Nepal's Karnali and Dhaulagiri Zones with a border crossing into Mustang District leading through the former Lo Kingdom to its historic capital Lo Manthang.

== Administration divisions ==
Zhongba County is divided into 1 town and 12 townships.

Name	Chinese	Hanyu Pinyin	Tibetan	Wylie
Town
Baryang Town (Paryang)	帕羊镇	Pàyáng zhèn	བར་ཡངས་གྲོང་རྡལ།	bar yangs grong rdal
Townships
Labrang Township (Drongpa)	拉让乡	Lāràng xiāng	ལ་བྲང་ཤང་།	la brang shang
Qonkor Township	琼果乡	Qióngguǒ xiāng	ཆོས་འཁོར་ཤང་།	chos 'khor shang
Yagra Township	亚热乡	Yàrè xiāng	ཡག་ར་ཤང་།	yag ra shang
Bodoi Township	布多乡	Bùduō xiāng	སྤོ་སྟོད་ཤང་།	spo stod shang
Penchi Township	偏吉乡	Piānjí xiāng	ཕན་ཕྱི་ཤང་།	phen phyi shang
Nagqu Township	纳久乡	Nàjiǔ xiāng	ནག་ཆུ་ཤང་།	nag chu shang
Gêla Township	吉拉乡	Jílā xiāng	སྐེད་ལ་ཤང་།	sked la shang
Horpa Township	霍尔巴乡	Huò'ěrbā xiāng	ཧོར་པ་ཤང་།	hor pa shang
Lunggar Township	隆嘎尔乡	Lónggā'ěr xiāng	ལུང་དཀར་ཤང་།	lung dkar shang
Gyêma Township	吉玛乡	Jímǎ xiāng	སྐྱེ་མ་ཤང་།	skye ma shang
Rintor Township	仁多乡	Rénduō xiāng	རི་འཐོར་ཤང་།	ri 'thor shang
Barma Township (Pama)	帕江乡	Pàjiāng xiāng	བར་མ་ཤང་།	bar ma shang

== Maps ==
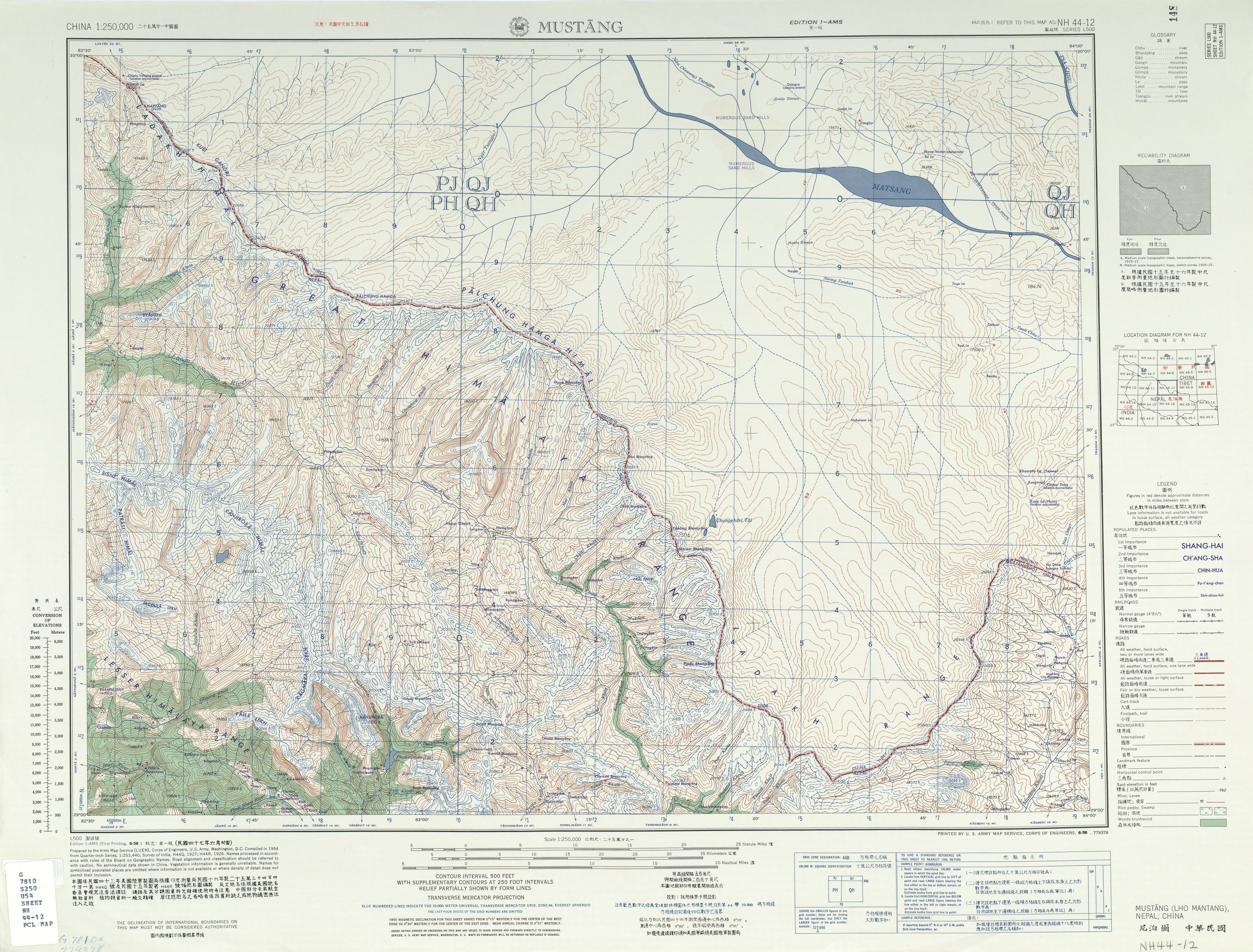
Map showing "Matsang" and the southern portion bordering Nepal (AMS, 1954)

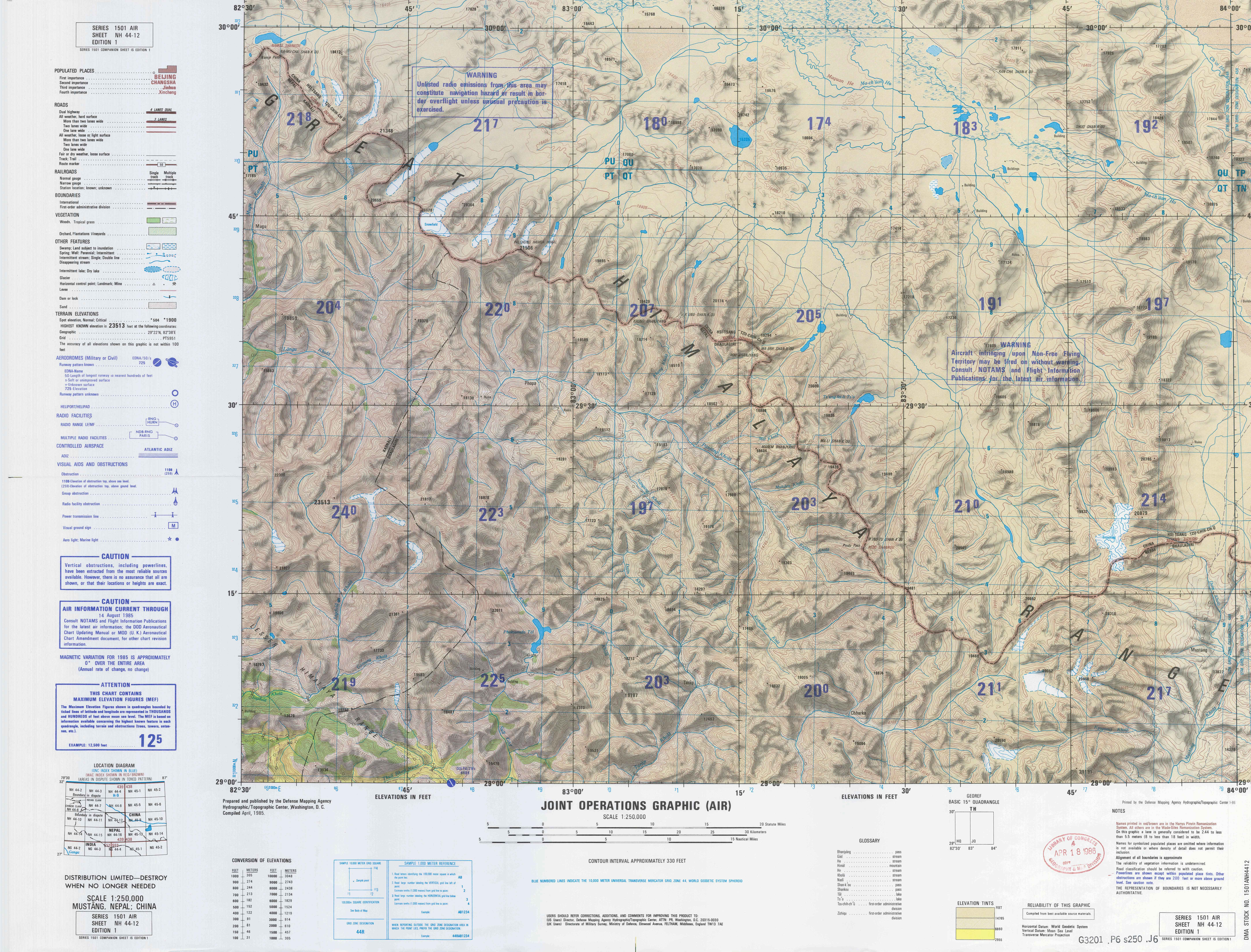
Map showing "Matsang" and the southern portion bordering Nepal (DMA, 1985)

== Transport ==
China National Highway 219

== Bibliography ==
- Dorje, Gyurme (2004), Footprint Tibet Handbook with Bhutan (3rd ed.), Bath: Footprint Handbooks, ISBN 1-903471-30-3 – via archive.org
