= Coqên Town =

Coqên
- Town
- Interactive map of Coqên
- Location within Tibet
- Coordinates: 31°1′8″N 85°9′30″E
- Country: China
- Region: Tibet
- Prefecture: Ngari Prefecture
- County: Coqên County
- Elevation: 4,718 m (15,479 ft)

Population
  - Major Nationalities: Tibetan
  - Regional dialect: Tibetan language
- Time zone: +8

Coqên is a town and seat of Coqên County in Ngari Prefecture of the Tibet Autonomous Region of China. It lies at an altitude of 4,718 metres (15,482 feet). It is on the main route between Lhasa and Kashgar, northwest of Lhaze. Lakes not too far away include Zhari Nanmu Lake, Dawa Lake and Taruo Lake.

== See also ==
- List of towns and villages in Tibet
