= Coqên County =

Coqên County 措勤县 • མཚོ་ཆེན་རྫོང་།
- County
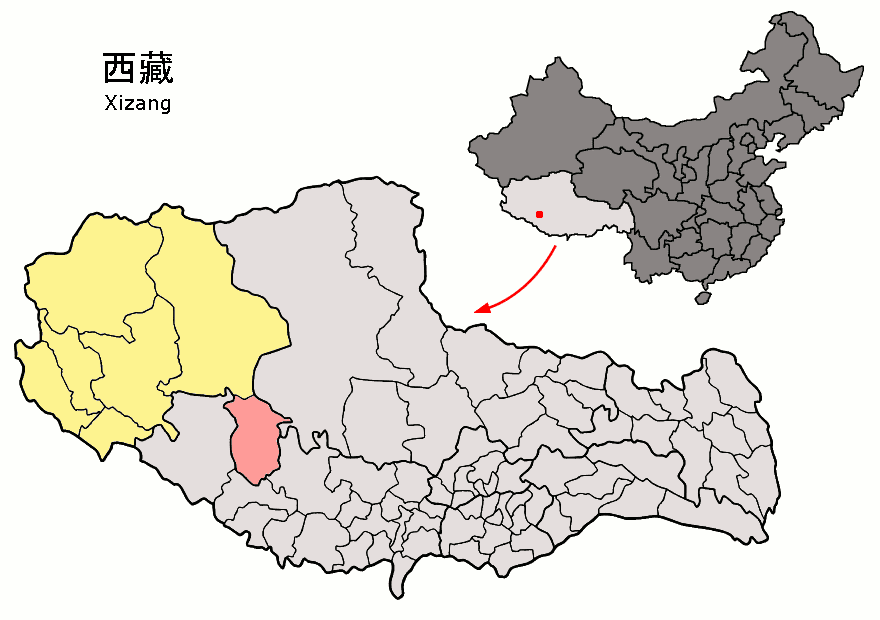
- Location of Coqên County within Tibet Autonomous Region

- Location of the seat in the Tibet AR Coqên (Tibet) Coqên (China)
- Coordinates (Coqên County government): 30°45′14″N 85°15′53″E
- Country: China
- Autonomous region: Tibet
- Prefecture: Ngari
- County seat: Coqên

Area
  - Total: 22,893.5 km^{2} (8,839.2 sq mi)

Population (2020)
  - Total: 17,027
  - Density: 0.74375/km^{2} (1.9263/sq mi)
- Time zone: UTC+8 (China Standard)
- Postal code: 859300
- Website: cq.al.gov.cn

Coqên County

Chinese name
- Simplified Chinese: 措勤县
- Traditional Chinese: 措勤縣
Transcriptions
Standard Mandarin
- Hanyu Pinyin: Cuòqín Xiàn

Tibetan name
- Tibetan: མཚོ་ཆེན་རྫོང་།
Transcriptions
- Wylie: mtsho chen rdzong
- Tibetan Pinyin: Coqên Zong

Coqên County (Tibetan: མཚོ་ཆེན་རྫོང་།; Chinese: 措勤县) is a county in the Ngari Prefecture, in the west of the Tibet Autonomous Region of China. It is the located in the southeast of Ngari Prefecture.

== Administrative divisions ==
Coqên county is divided into 1 town and 4 townships:

Name	Chinese	Hanyu Pinyin	Tibetan	Wylie
Town
Coqên Town	措勤镇	Cuòqín zhèn	མཚོ་ཆེན་གྲོང་རྡལ།	mtsho chen grong rdal
Townships
Cêri Township	磁石乡	Císhí xiāng	མཚེ་རི་ཤང་།	mtshe ri shang
Chulho Township	曲洛乡	Qǔluò xiāng	ཆུ་ལྷོ་ཤང་།	chu lho shang
Gyangrang Township	江让乡	Jiāngràng xiāng	རྐྱང་ཧྲེང་ཤང་།	rkyang hreng shang
Daxung Township	达雄乡	Dáxióng xiāng	ཟླ་གཞུང་ཤང་།	zla gzhung shang

== See also ==
- Semo La

== Gallery ==
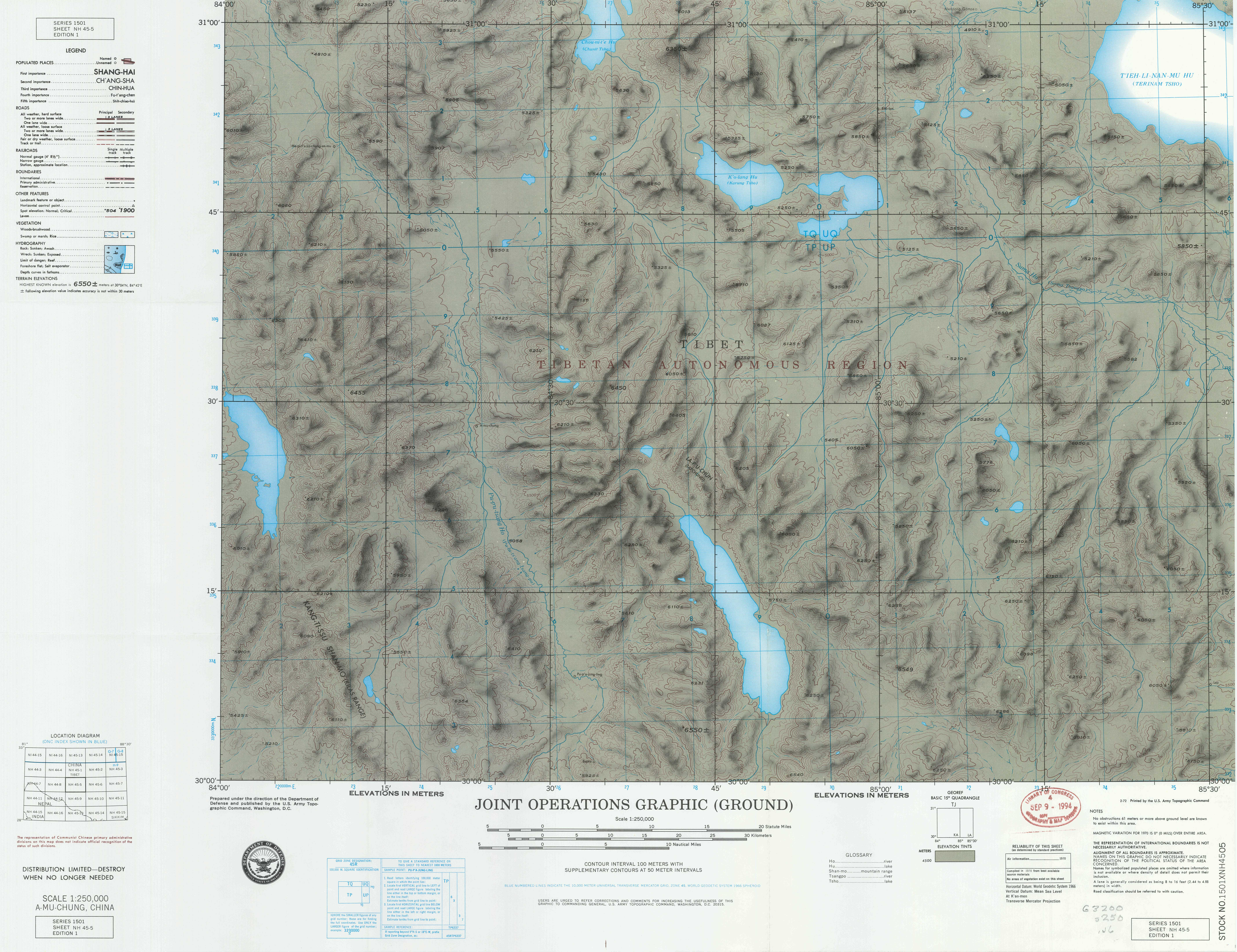
