= Cogo =

Cogo may refer to:

- COGO, coordinate geometry software
- CoGo, a bikeshare system in Columbus, Ohio
- Cogo, Equatorial Guinea, town
- Cogo, Tibet, village
- Cogo (toy company), a Chinese company of brick toys
