= Gyaco Town =

Township in Tingri County, Tibet, China

Gyaco Township 加措乡
- Town
- Location within Tibet
- Coordinates: 28°50′N 87°14′E
- Country: China
- Autonomous region: Tibet Autonomous Region
- Prefecture-level city: Shigatse
- County: Tingri County

Population (2010)
  - Total: 1,319

Gyamco Township is a township of Tingri County, Tibet Autonomous Region, China. Its downtown area is Guore Village (simplified Chinese: 果热村; traditional Chinese: 果熱村; pinyin: Guǒrè Cūn), also referred as Gyaco in English. Per the 2010 Chinese Census, it has a population of 1,319, up from the 1,260 recorded in the 2000 Chinese Census.

== See also ==
- List of towns and villages in Tibet
