= Shelkar =

Shelkar ཤེལ་དཀར་ New Tingri / Shegar / Shekar
- Town
- Xêgar 协格尔
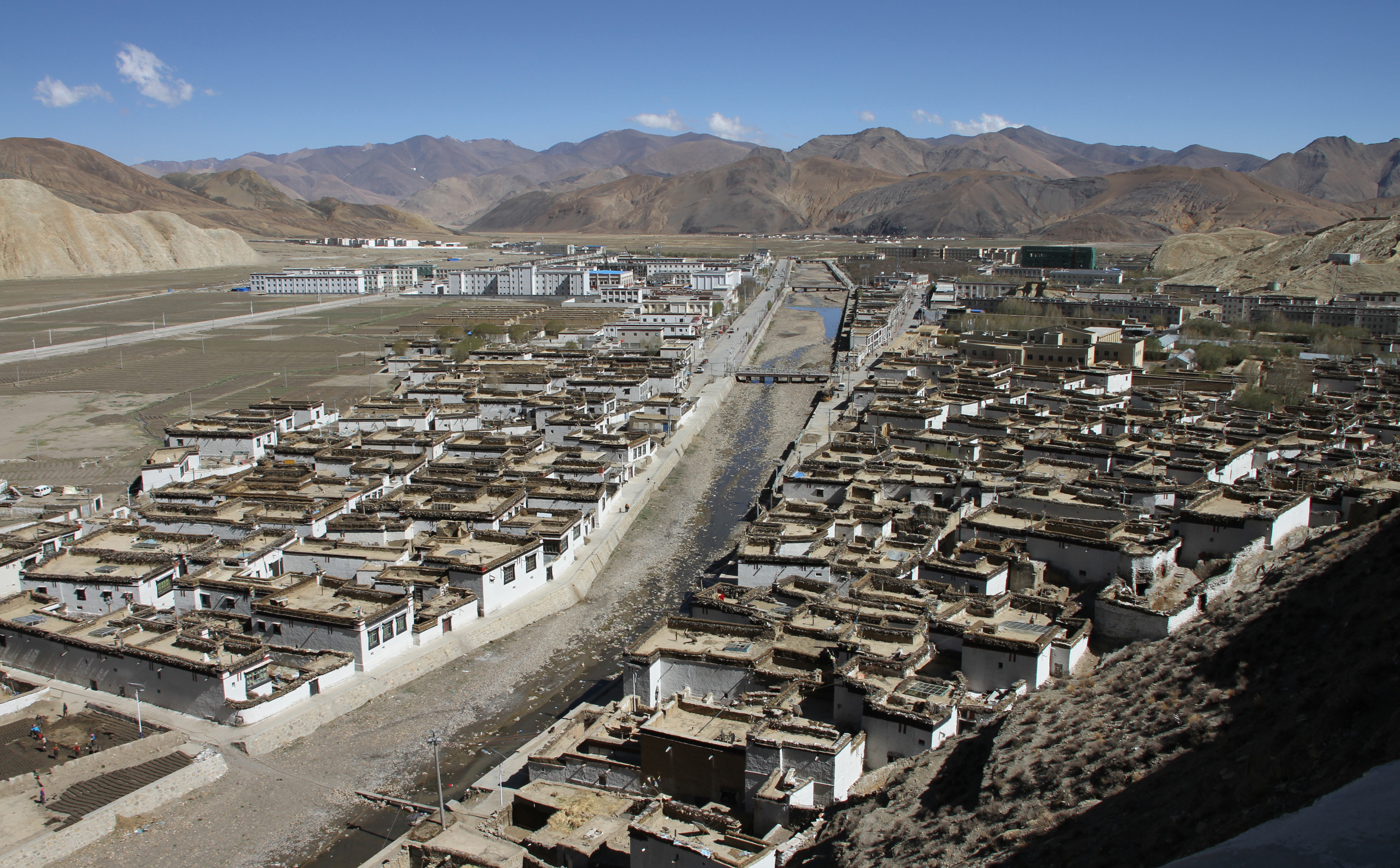
- View of Shelkar in 2014

- Location within Tibet
- Coordinates: 28°39′30″N 87°07′20″E
- Country: China
- Province: Tibet Autonomous Region
- Prefecture: Shigatse Prefecture
- County: Tingri County
- Elevation: 4,330 m (14,210 ft)

Population (2010)
  - Total: 9,528
- Time zone: UTC+8 (CST)

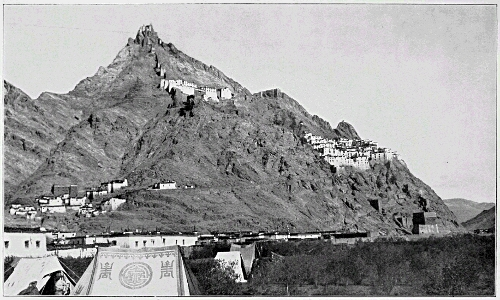
Shekar Dzong in 1921 from C. K. Howard-Bury, Mount Everest the Reconnaissance, 1921 (1 ed.). New York, Longman & Green, page 67

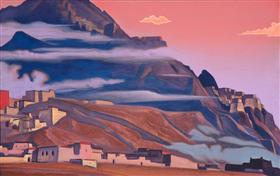
1933 Shekar Dzong (fortress) and Shekar monastery painted by Russian artist Nicholas Roerich; destroyed by Chinese Communist forces during the 1959 Tibetan uprising

Shelkar or Shekar (Tibetan: ཤེལ་དཀར་, "white crystal"; simplified Chinese: 协格尔镇; traditional Chinese: 協格爾鎮; pinyin: Xiégé'ěr Zhèn), also called New Tingri, is a town in, and the administrative centre for, Tingri County, Shigatse in southern Tibet Autonomous Region. The town has a population of 9,528, per the 2010 Chinese census.

== History ==
The early British expeditions to Mount Everest in 1921, 1922 and 1924 all stopped at Shelkar Dzong on their way from Darjeeling to the northern side of Everest.

== Geography ==
The town lies 7 kilometres (4.3 mi) off the Friendship Highway between Lhatse and Tingri, at an altitude of about 4,300 metres (14,100 ft), at the southern foot of 5,260 metres (17,260 ft) high Gyatso La. It is approximately 60 kilometres (37 mi) north-west of Mount Everest and just over 50 kilometres (31 mi) from the Nepali border in the Tibet Autonomous Region of China.

== Landmarks ==
Shelkar is famous for the Shelkar Chode Monastery, a Gelug monastery which was completely destroyed but is being restored. Despite being founded in 1266 by a Kagyu lama, it has been a Gelugpa monastery since the 17th century, and formerly had some 400 monks. Although, destroyed by the Red Guards during the Cultural Revolution, the assembly hall has been rebuilt, and there is an active branch monastery in Boudhanath, Nepal.

Shelkar Chode Monastery

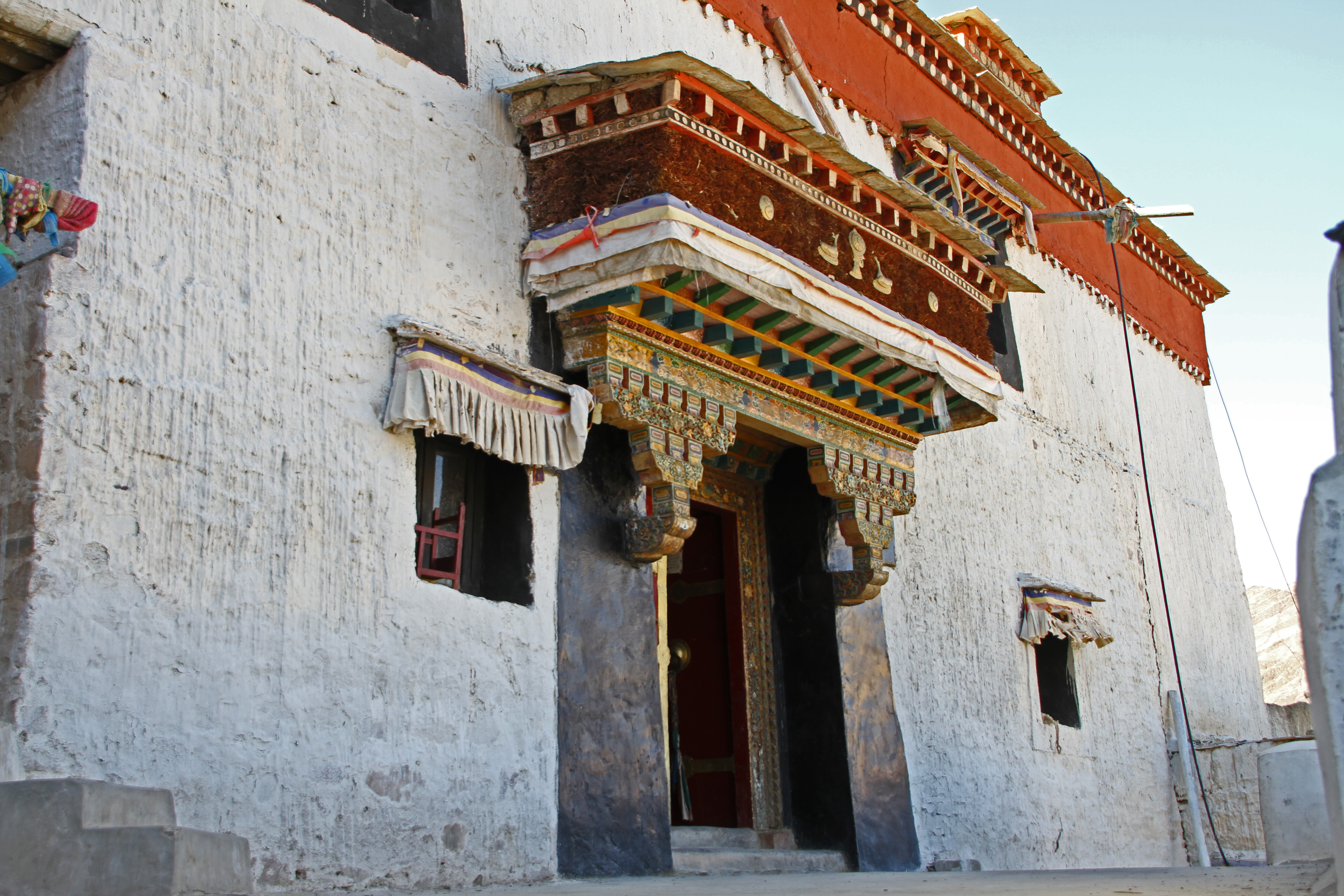

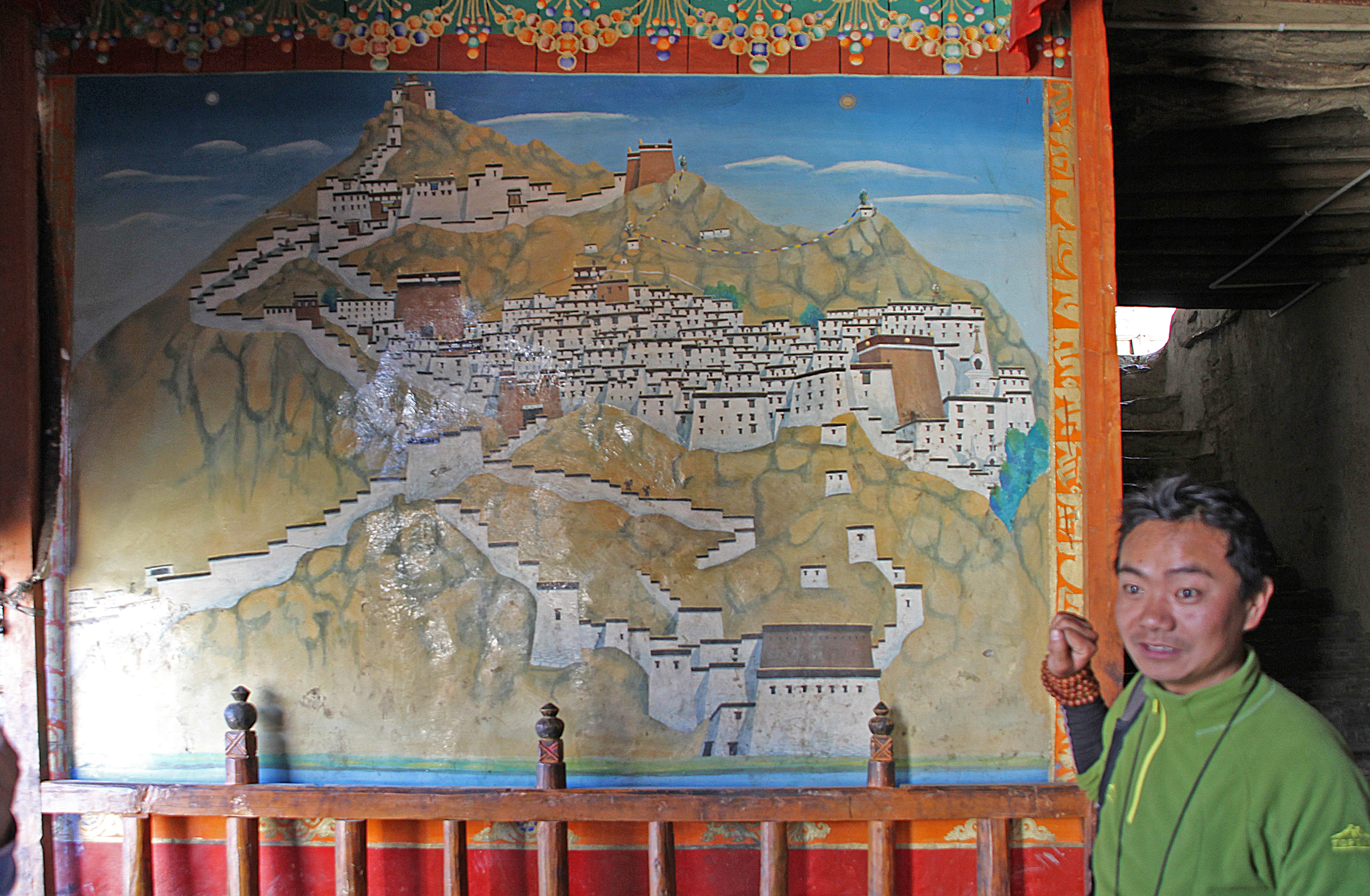

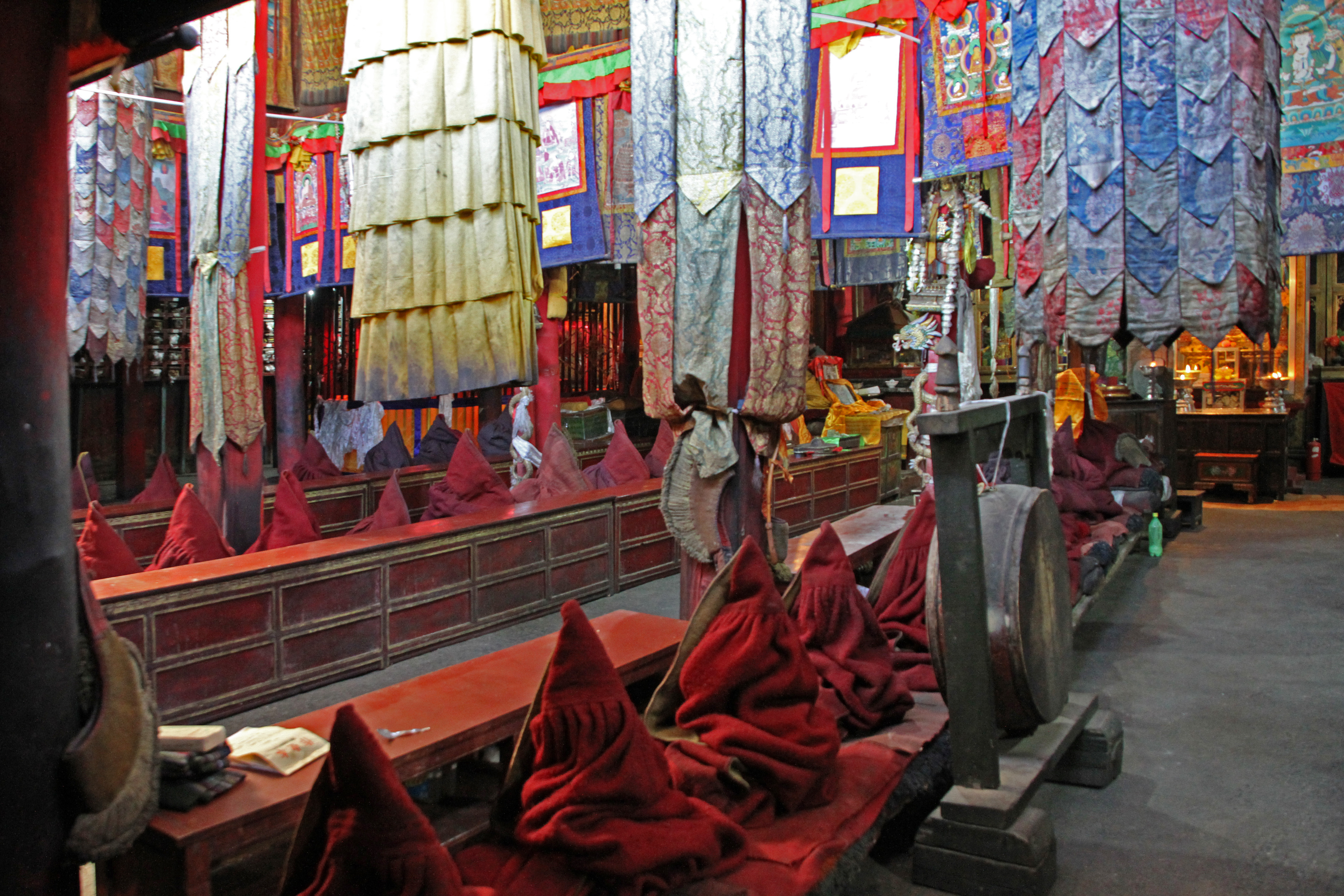

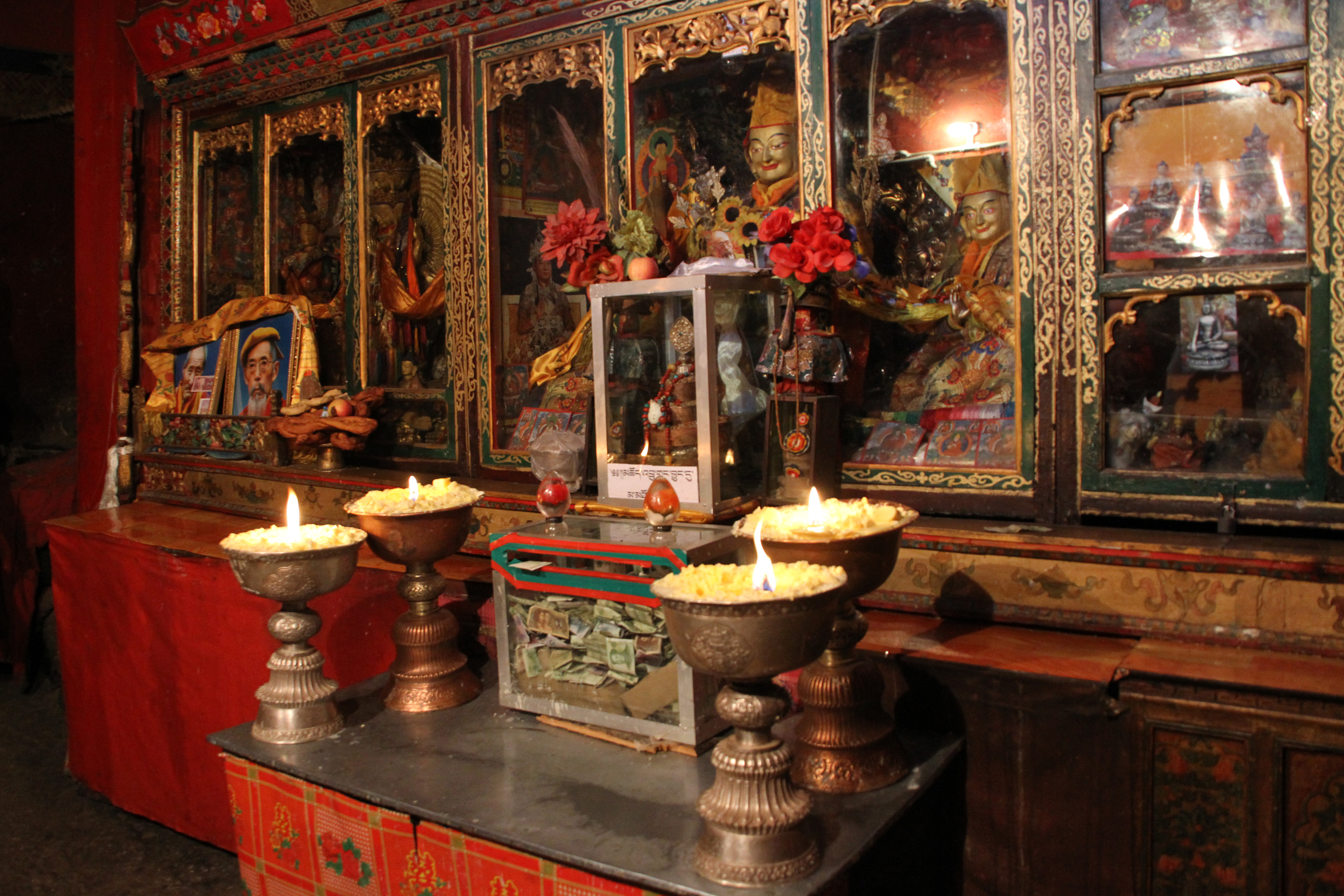

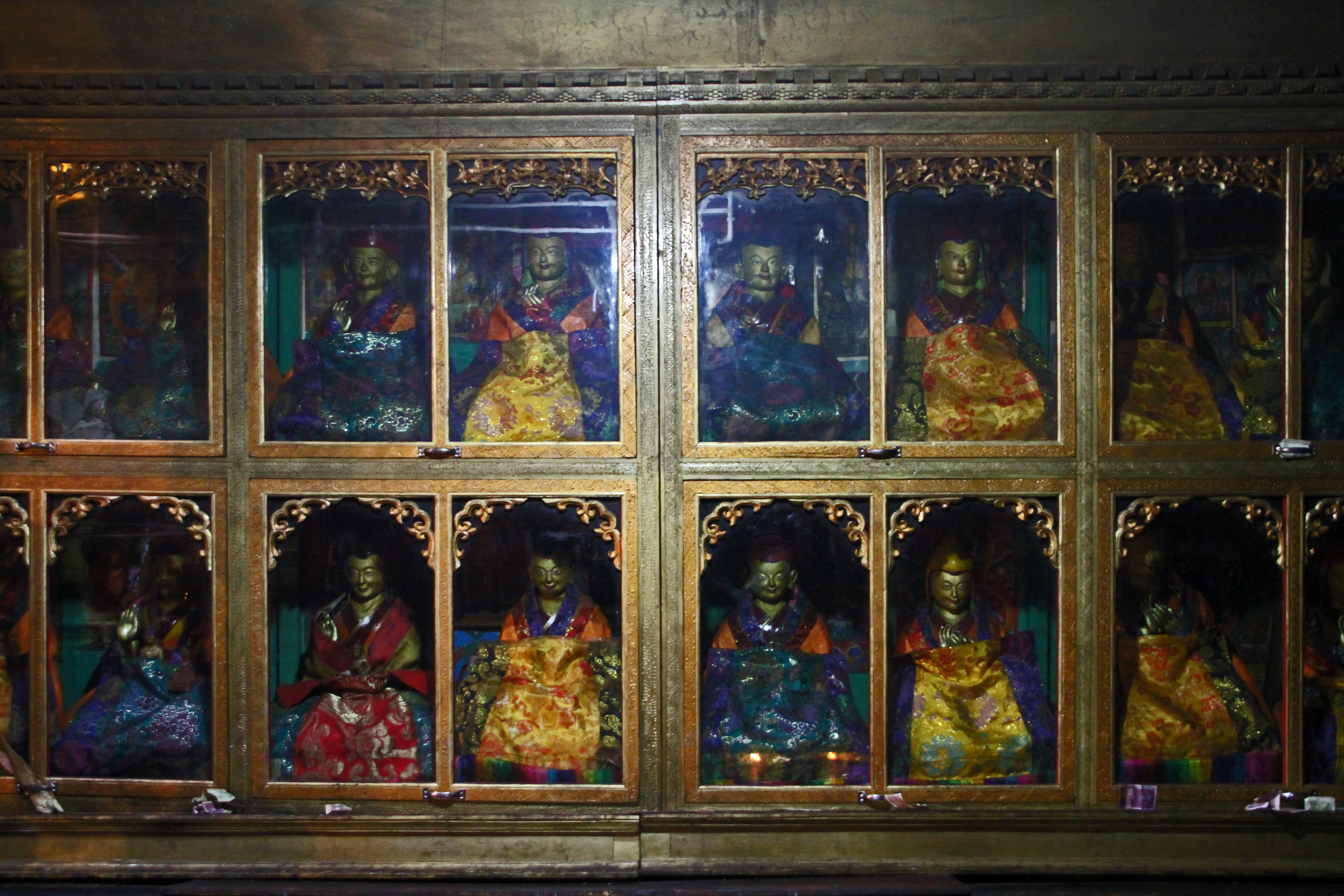

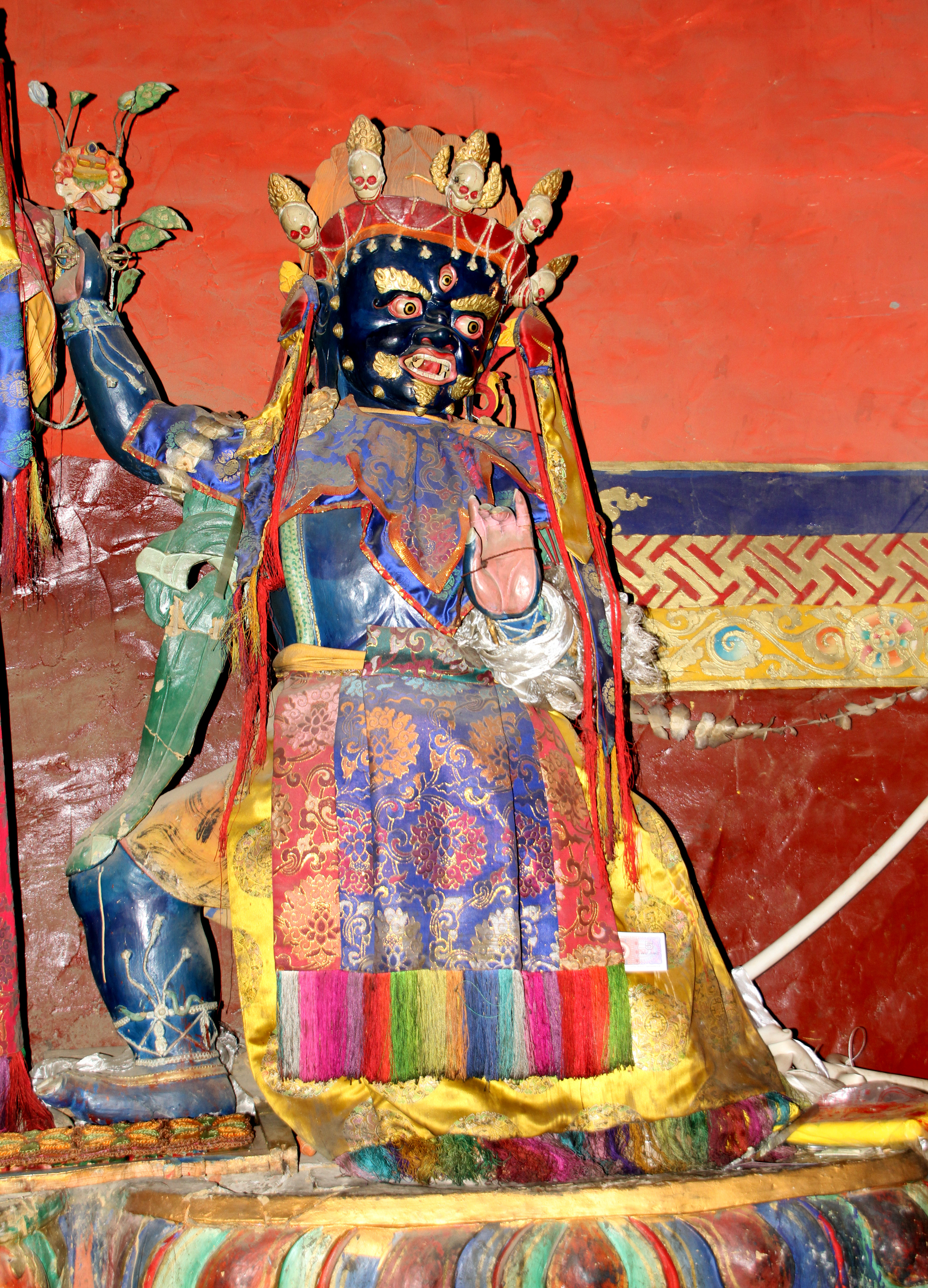

The old Shekar Dorje dzong, or fort, is above the new town and used to enclose Shekar Chode. The ruins of the old Dzong are located on the hill behind the monastery.

== Demographics ==
The town has a population of 9,528, per the 2010 Chinese census, up from the 8,767 recorded in the 2000 Chinese Census.
