= Tingri Plain =

The Tingri Plain is a plateau in Tibet Autonomous Region, China, not far north of Mount Everest. Climbers who are headed to Everest often cross this plain after making a base in the town of Tingri.

Many folk legends in the history of Nepal are linked with it, especially about Kathmandu. The Powerful goddess 'Taleju Bhawani' a Yakshini is said to be from the Tingri Plain. Other 'Lakheys' or demons are also said to be from this place. It is said that in due course, the entire city of Kathmandu will be shifted north to the Tingri Plain.

== See also ==
- Yeti
