= Chamco Township =

Township in Tingri, Shigatse, Tibet, China

Chamco Township 长所乡
- Town
- Location within Tibet
- Coordinates: 28°37′54″N 87°31′02″E
- Country: China
- Autonomous region: Tibet Autonomous Region
- Prefecture-level city: Shigatse
- County: Tingri County

Population (2010)
  - Total: 3,601

Chamco Township (simplified Chinese: 长所乡; traditional Chinese: 長所鄉; pinyin: Chángsuǒ Xiāng) is a township in Tingri County, Tibet Autonomous Region of China. Per the 2010 Chinese Census, it has a population of 3,601.

== Geography ==
It lies at an altitude of 4,255 metres (13,963 feet).

== Administrative divisions ==
It has authority over the village committees of ten different villages, including Senga Village, Gurong Village, and Chajiang Village, among others. Senga Village is where the administrative offices for the township are located.

== Demographics ==
Per the 2010 Chinese Census, it has a population of 3,601, up from the 3,379 recorded in the 2000 Chinese Census.

== See also ==
- List of towns and villages in Tibet
