= Qulho Township, Tingri County =

Township in Tibet, China

Qulho Township 曲洛乡
- Town
- Location within Tibet
- Coordinates: 28°35′36″N 87°20′58″E
- Country: China
- Autonomous region: Tibet Autonomous Region
- Prefecture-level city: Shigatse
- County: Tingri County

Population (2010)
  - Total: 3,033

Qulho Township (simplified Chinese: 曲洛乡; traditional Chinese: 曲洛鄉; pinyin: Qūluò Xiāng) is a township in Tingri County, Shigatse, Tibet Autonomous Region, China. Per the 2010 Chinese Census, it has a population of 3,033, up from the 2,745 recorded in the 2000 Chinese Census.

== See also ==
- List of towns and villages in Tibet
