= Cogo Township =

Township in China

Cogo Township 措果乡
- Town
- Location within Tibet
- Coordinates: 28°29′35″N 87°28′30″E
- Country: China
- Autonomous region: Tibet Autonomous Region
- Prefecture-level city: Shigatse
- County: Tingri County

Population (2010)
  - Total: 3,556

Cogo Township or Cuoguo Township (simplified Chinese: 措果乡; traditional Chinese: 措果鄉; pinyin: Cuòguǒ Xiāng) is a township in Tingri County, Xigazê, Tibet Autonomous Region, China. Its name is also transliterated as Cuike (Chinese: 崔科; pinyin: Cuīkē).

== Toponymy ==
The township's name means "lakefront" due to Cogo's location on the north side of a tectonic lake.

== Geography ==
It has an elevation of 4,188 metres (13,740 ft) above sea level.

== Administrative divisions ==
As of 2000, the township contained seven villages: Xuezhu (雪珠村), Jiweng (吉翁村), Meiduo (美朵村), Jiding (吉定村), Gareguoji (嘎热果吉村), Tangren (唐仁村), and Yejiang (野江村). The township seat is at Xuezhu.

== Demographics ==
Per the 2010 Chinese Census, Cogo Township has a population of 3,556. In 2000 the township had a population of 3,258 people in 627 households. It had an elementary school and a rural hospital.
