= Tingri (town) =

Gangga སྒང་དགའ་ Tingri
- Town

Tibetan transcription(s)
  - Tibetan: སྒང་དགའ་
  - Wylie transliteration: sgang dga'
  - IPA: [tʰìŋri]

Chinese transcription(s)
  - Traditional: 崗嘎鎮
  - Simplified: 岗嘎镇
  - Pinyin: Gǎnggā Zhèn
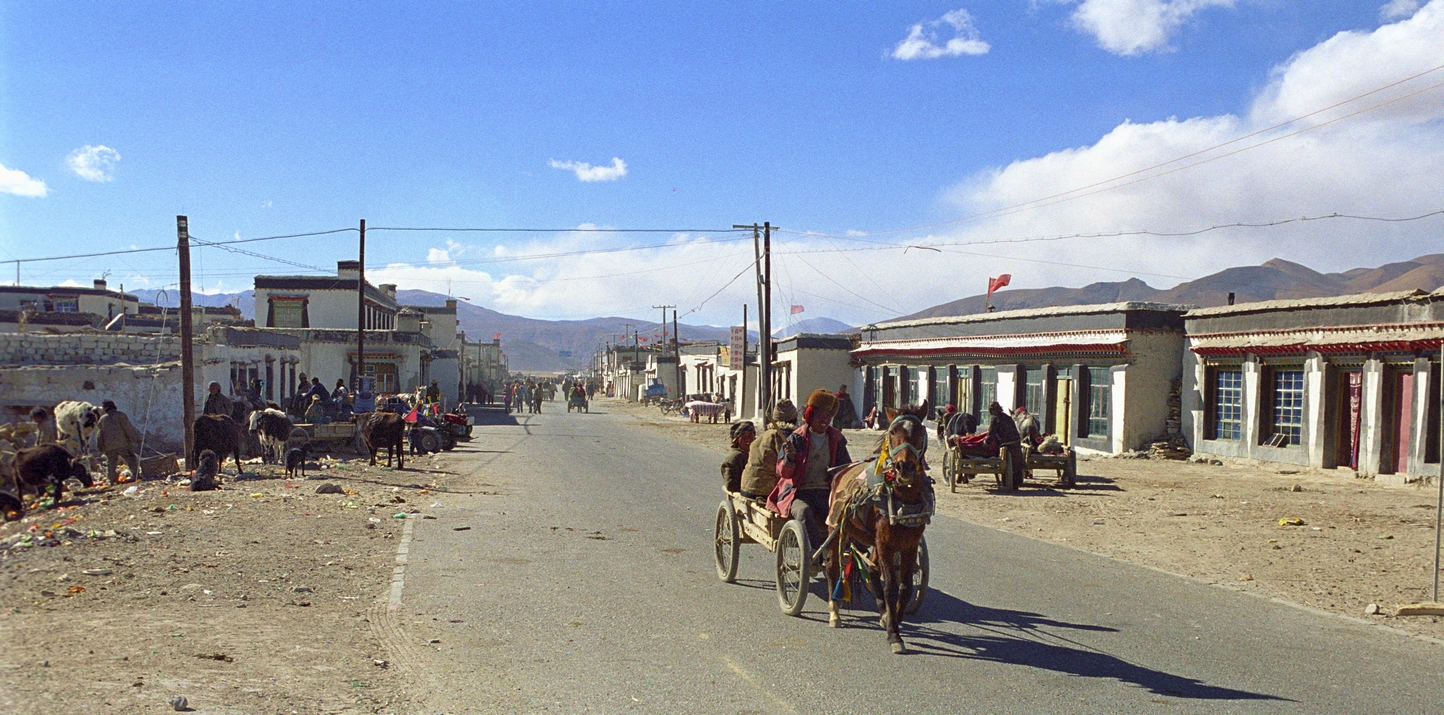

- Location in the Tibet Autonomous Region
- Coordinates (Gangga / Tingri town government): 28°34′52″N 86°36′36″E
- Country: People's Republic of China
- Autonomous region: Tibet
- Prefecture: Shigatse
- County: Tingri
- Elevation: 4,348 m (14,265 ft)

Population (2010)
  - Total: 6,850
  - Major Nationalities: Tibetan
  - Regional dialect: Tibetan language
- Time zone: UTC+8 (CST)

Gangga (Tibetan: སྒང་དགའ་, Wylie: sgang dga'; Chinese: 岗嘎镇; pinyin: Gǎnggā Zhèn), or Tingri (according to name of region), is a town in Tingri County, in the south of the Tibet Autonomous Region. It is often used as a base by mountain climbers preparing to ascend Mount Everest or Cho Oyu. The town is known for its views of Mount Everest, Mount Lhotse, Mount Makalu, and Cho Oyu, which comprise four of the six highest mountains in the world. Per the 2010 Chinese Census, it has a population of 6,850.

Tingri used to be an important trading post where Sherpas from Nepal exchanged rice, grain and iron for Tibetan wool, livestock and salt. It gives its name to the more than 4,500-meter (14,800 ft)-high broad upland basin that is known as the Tingri Plain. One must cross the pass known as the Lak Pa La (el. 5,220 meters (17,130 ft)) to the north to reach the Tsangpo Valley system. Shallow, fast-flowing rivers of melted snow water make its grassy meadowland ideal for grazing for Tibetan animals. The plain used to abound with gazelles, blue sheep, antelopes and khyang or wild asses but most of the animals are gone now. The Chinese army has a small base nearby.

Tingri Lankor (Ding ri glang 'khor) — Padampa's Residence was founded in 1097 CE by the South Indian Buddhist adept, Padampa Sangye (died 1117) who made five visits to Tibet and was an important person in the re-establishment of the Buddhadharma in Tibet. His consort was the Tibetan dakini Machik Labdron. The gompa or temple was built in the Padampa Sange's meditation cave and became the seat of the Dampapa School of Tibetan Buddhism. It is in the process of restoration.

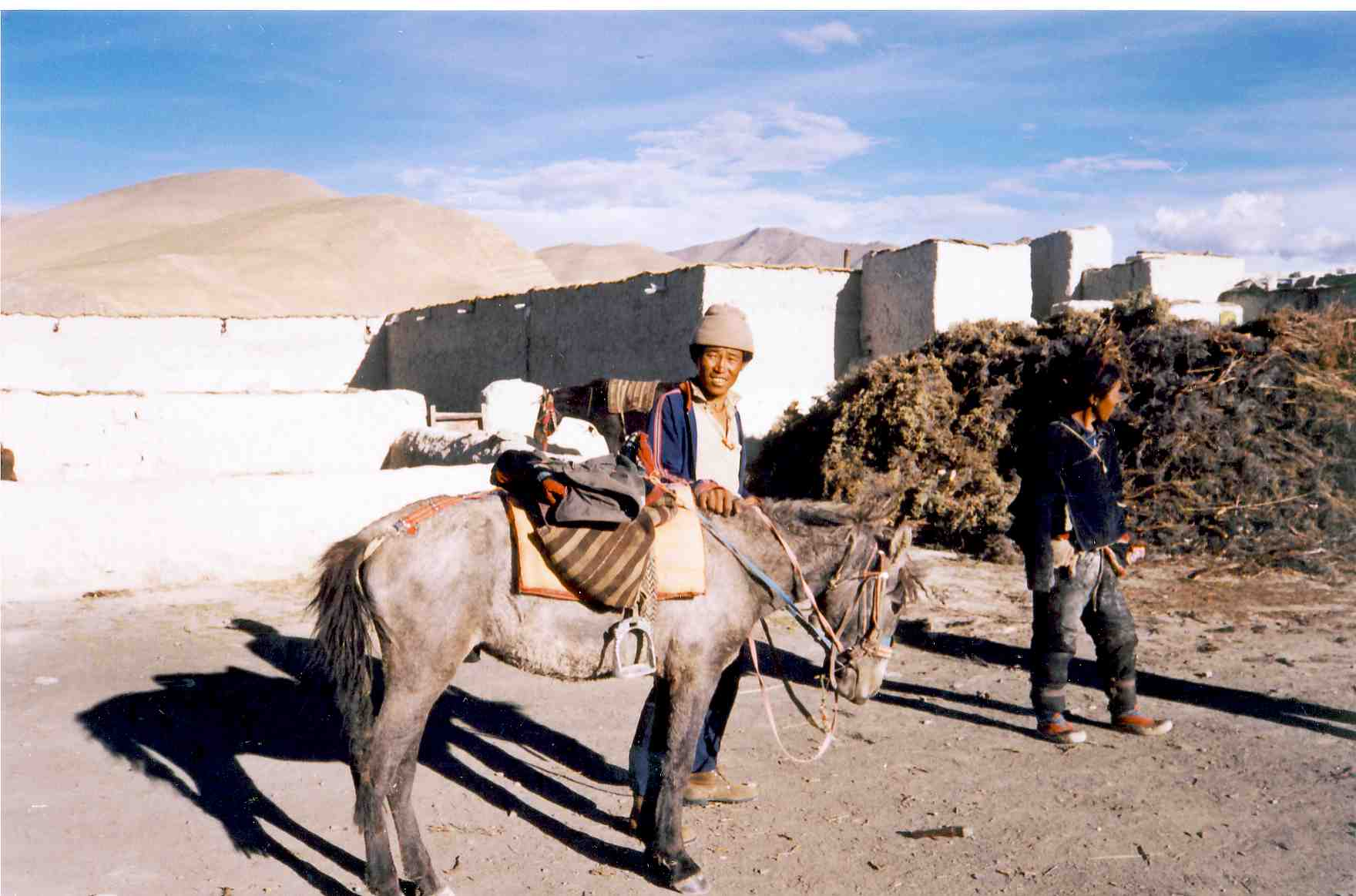
Tingri Dzong, 1993

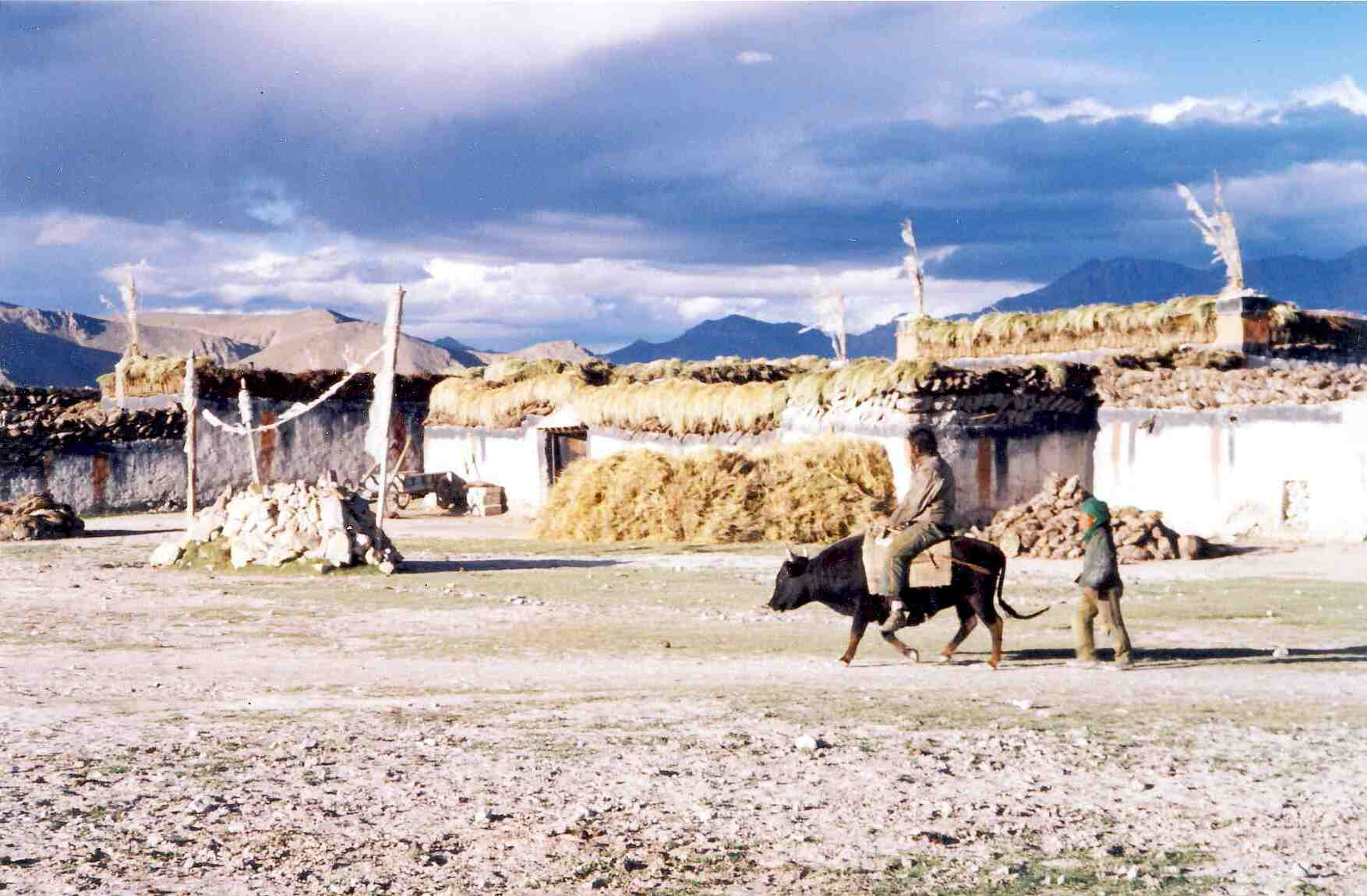
Riding a dzo. Tingri, Tibet. 1993.

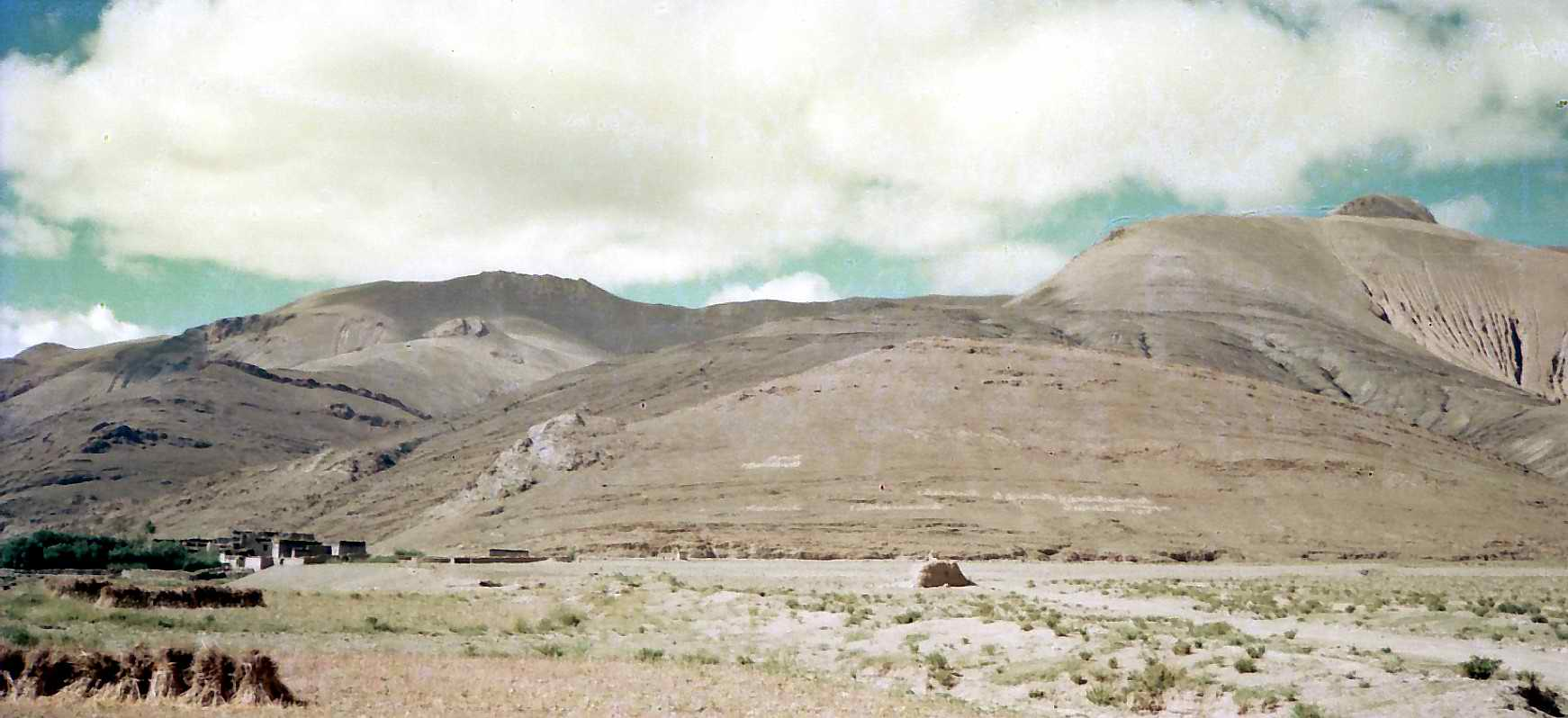
Tingri town, Tibet. 1993.

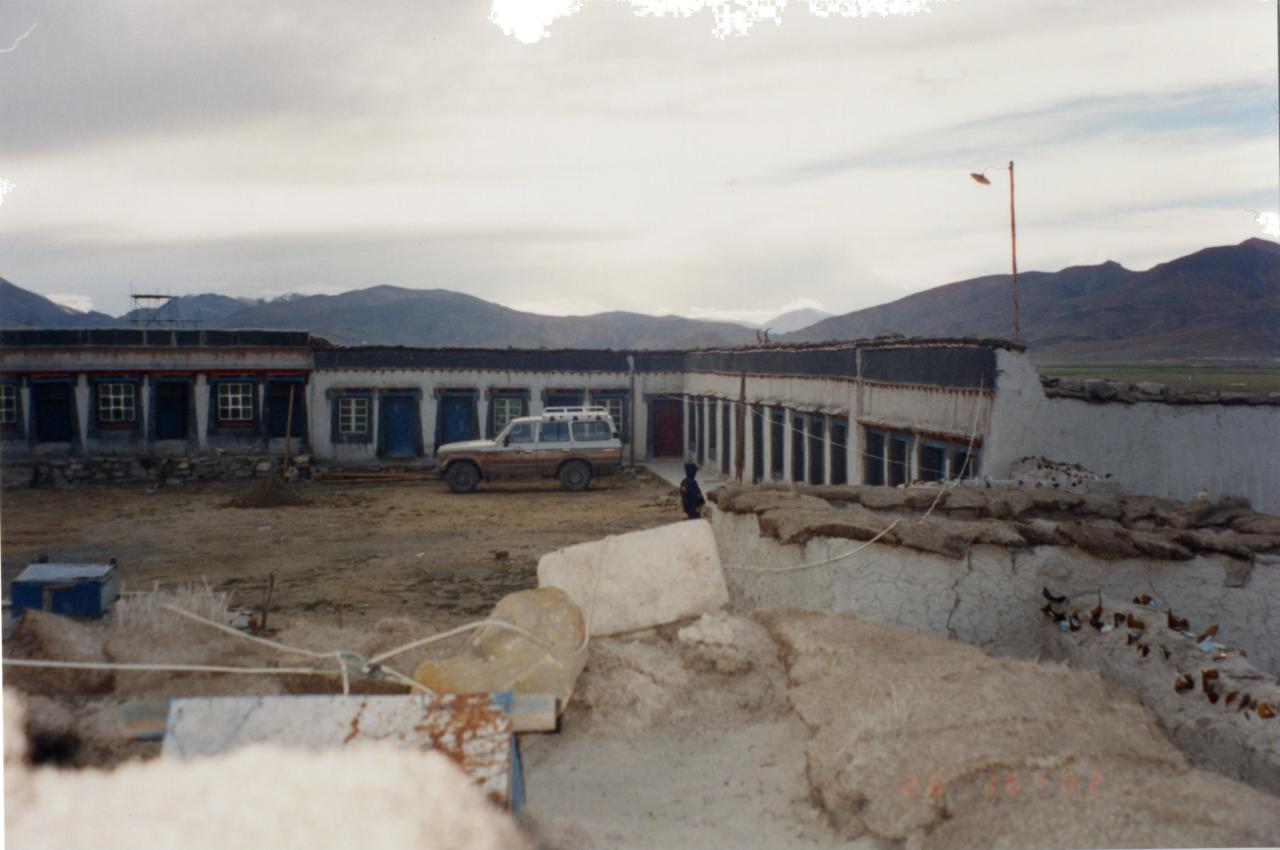
Tingri town (hotel)

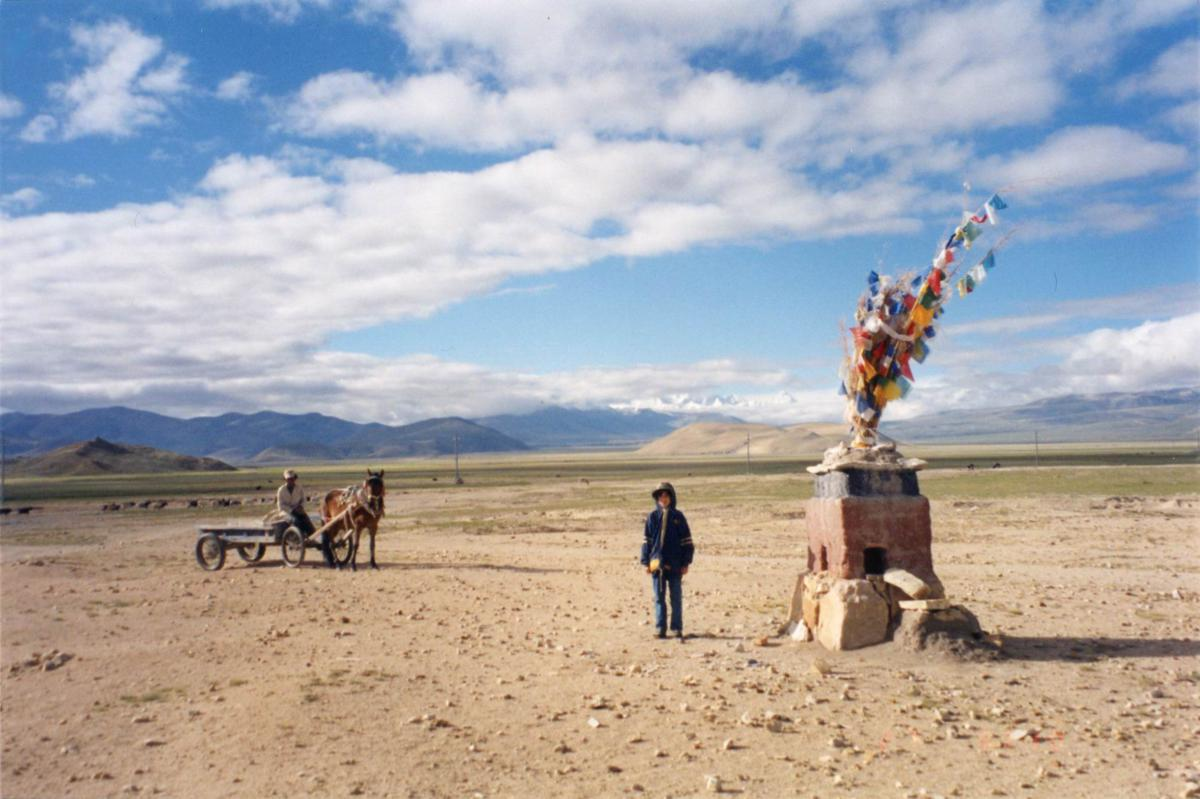
View of Himalaya from Tingri

== Demographics ==
Per the 2010 Chinese Census, it has a population of 6,850, up from the 6,622 recorded in the 2000 Chinese Census.

== See also ==
- List of towns and villages in Tibet
