= Tingri County =

Tingri County 定日县 • དིང་རི་རྫོང་། Dhringgri
- County
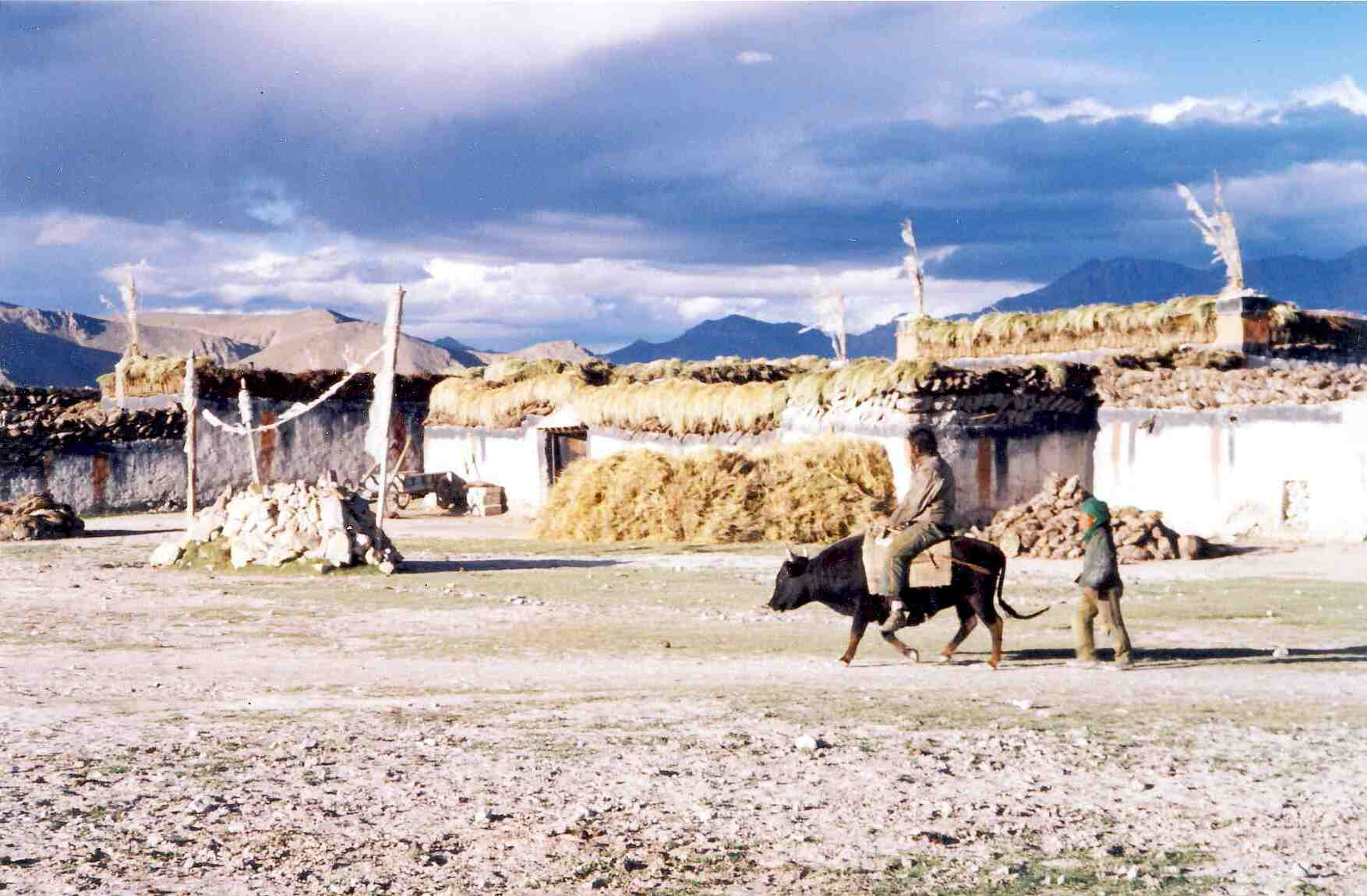
- A man riding a dzo in Tingri County, 1993

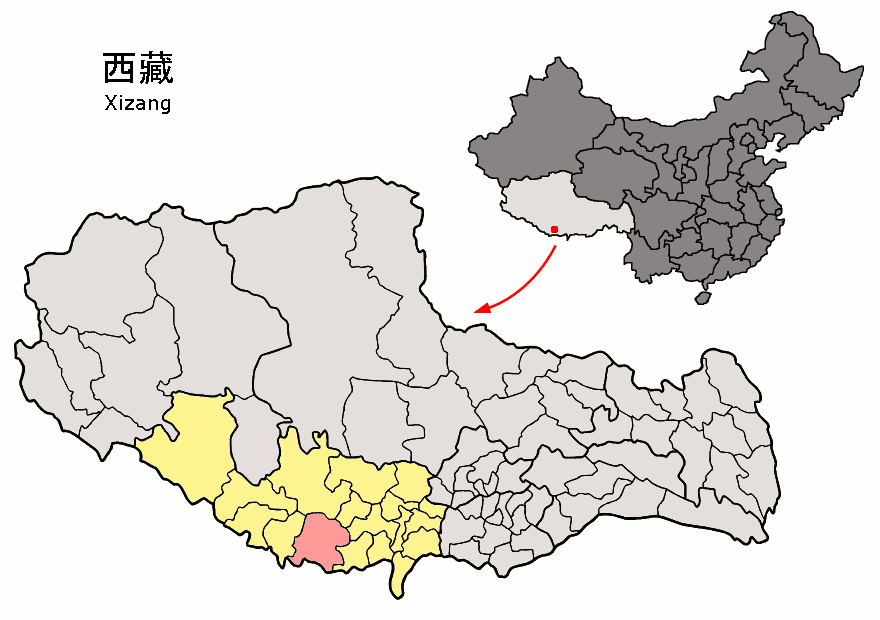
- Location of Tingri County (red) within Shigatse City (yellow) and the Tibet Autonomous Region

- Location of the seat in the Tibet Autonomous Region Tingri County (China)
- Coordinates (Tingri County seat, Shelkar): 28°39′36″N 87°07′30″E
- Country: China
- Autonomous region: Tibet
- Prefecture-level city: Shigatse
- County seat: Shelkar

Area
  - Total: 13,861.21 km^{2} (5,351.84 sq mi)

Population (2020)
  - Total: 58,173
  - Density: 4.1968/km^{2} (10.870/sq mi)
- Time zone: UTC+8 (China Standard)
- Website: www.drx.gov.cn

Tingri County

Chinese name
- Simplified Chinese: 定日县
- Traditional Chinese: 定日縣
Transcriptions
Standard Mandarin
- Hanyu Pinyin: Dìngrì Xiàn

Tibetan name
- Tibetan: དིང་རི་རྫོང་།
Transcriptions
- Wylie: ding ri rdzong
- Tibetan Pinyin: Tingri Zong

Tingri County (Tibetan: དིང་རི་རྫོང་།; simplified Chinese: 定日县; traditional Chinese: 定日縣; pinyin: Dìngrì Xiàn) is a county under the administration of the prefecture-level city of Shigatse in the Tibet Autonomous Region of China.

The county comprises the upper valley of the Bum-chu or Arun River, with the valleys of its tributaries, the valleys of the Rongshar Tsangpo and the Lapchi Gang Tsangpo which flow south into Nepal. It is bordered on the south by the main range of the Himalayas, including Mount Everest (Tib. Jomolangma), Makalu and Cho Oyu. The present county administration is located at Shelkar, about 87 km (54 mi) east of Tingri (town).

Tingri is one of the four counties (the other three being Dinjie, Nyalam, and Kyirong) that comprise the Qomolangma National Nature Preserve, a protected area spanning 3.381 million hectares.

== Toponymy ==
Tingri County is named after a nearby hill, which itself is reportedly named after the sound a falling stone made when it hit the hill.

== History ==
Shelkar Dzong was built in the area of the present-day county during the time of the Kashag.

In 1960, Tingri County was established, and in June of that year, a local county government was established. The county headquarters were originally established in Shelkar, but were moved to Gangga in August. In July 1968, the local government moved back to Shelkar, where it remains today.

In 1992, the county was added to the Qomolangma National Nature Preserve.

On 7 January 2025 at 09:05 CST (UTC+8), an earthquake measuring M_{w} 7.1 or M_{s} 6.8 struck Tingri County. Several villages experienced near-total destruction and at least 126 people died and hundreds more were injured.

== Geography ==
Dingri County is a county under the jurisdiction of prefecture-level city of Shigatse. It is located in the southern part of the Tibet Autonomous Region and the south-central part of Shigatse. It borders Dinggyê County and Sa'gya County to the east, Nyalam County to the west, Ngamring County to the north, Lhatse County to the northeast, and Nepal to the south. It is 115 kilometres (71 mi) long from east to west and 152 kilometres (94 mi) wide from north to south, with a total area of about 14,000 square kilometres (5,400 sq mi).

Tingri County is located at the northern foot of the middle section of the Himalayas, and at the northern foot of Mount Everest. The county's landscape is extremely mountainous, with an average altitude of more than 5,000 metres (16,000 ft) above sea level, and the county seat situated at an altitude of 4,300 metres (14,100 ft) above sea level. The world's highest peak, Mount Everest, and the world's sixth-highest mountain, Cho Oyu, are located in the county.

The Arun River flows eastward out of the country.

=== Climate ===
According to the Köppen Climate Classification Tingiri County's climate is a semi-arid climate (BSk) with large temperature differences between day and night, a high amount of sunshine hours, and little annual precipitation. On January 7, 1966, Tingri County recorded the lowest temperature ever recorded in Tibet at −46.4 °C (−51.5 °F).

Climate data for Tingri, elevation 4,300 m (14,100 ft), (1991–2020 normals, extremes 1981–2020)
Month	Jan	Feb	Mar	Apr	May	Jun	Jul	Aug	Sep	Oct	Nov	Dec	Year
Record high °C (°F)	14.7 (58.5)	15.3 (59.5)	18.7 (65.7)	20.8 (69.4)	23.8 (74.8)	25.1 (77.2)	25.8 (78.4)	23.4 (74.1)	22.9 (73.2)	20.2 (68.4)	17.3 (63.1)	14.6 (58.3)	25.8 (78.4)
Mean daily maximum °C (°F)	3.7 (38.7)	5.1 (41.2)	8.3 (46.9)	11.9 (53.4)	16.1 (61.0)	20.2 (68.4)	19.5 (67.1)	18.2 (64.8)	17.5 (63.5)	13.3 (55.9)	8.8 (47.8)	5.8 (42.4)	12.4 (54.3)
Daily mean °C (°F)	−6.4 (20.5)	−4.4 (24.1)	−0.8 (30.6)	3.1 (37.6)	7.6 (45.7)	12.1 (53.8)	12.6 (54.7)	11.6 (52.9)	10.1 (50.2)	4.0 (39.2)	−1.6 (29.1)	−5.2 (22.6)	3.6 (38.4)
Mean daily minimum °C (°F)	−16.1 (3.0)	−14.1 (6.6)	−10.1 (13.8)	−5.4 (22.3)	−0.2 (31.6)	5.2 (41.4)	7.4 (45.3)	6.9 (44.4)	4.1 (39.4)	−4.2 (24.4)	−10.9 (12.4)	−14.9 (5.2)	−4.4 (24.1)
Record low °C (°F)	−46.4 (−51.5)	−25.3 (−13.5)	−19.0 (−2.2)	−14.0 (6.8)	−8.3 (17.1)	−4.0 (24.8)	1.4 (34.5)	0.2 (32.4)	−4.1 (24.6)	−12.3 (9.9)	−19.0 (−2.2)	−32.6 (−26.7)	−46.4 (−51.5)
Average precipitation mm (inches)	1.0 (0.04)	0.7 (0.03)	0.6 (0.02)	2.6 (0.10)	9.1 (0.36)	23.0 (0.91)	108.4 (4.27)	116.7 (4.59)	27.1 (1.07)	1.7 (0.07)	0.9 (0.04)	0.5 (0.02)	292.3 (11.52)
Average precipitation days (≥ 0.1 mm)	0.9	0.8	0.8	1.5	3.4	6.7	16.4	17.8	7.5	0.8	0.2	0.3	57.1
Average snowy days	1.3	1.7	2.7	4.6	4.3	0.3	0.1	0.2	0.4	1.0	0.4	0.6	17.6
Average relative humidity (%)	27	27	29	34	40	48	59	64	56	41	34	28	41
Mean monthly sunshine hours	281.1	262.5	300.2	300.2	327.7	289.6	222.0	220.0	261.6	310.2	292.9	286.5	3,354.5
Percentage possible sunshine	86	82	80	77	78	70	52	55	72	89	92	90	77
Source: China Meteorological Administration all-time extreme temperatureNOAA

== Administrative divisions ==
Tingri County is divided into 2 towns and 11 townships.

Name	Chinese	Hanyu Pinyin	Tibetan	Wylie
Towns
Shelkar	协格尔镇	Xiégé'ěr zhèn	ཤེལ་དཀར་གྲོང་རྡལ།	shel dkar grong rdal
Gangga	岗嘎镇	Gǎnggā zhèn	སྒང་དགའ་གྲོང་རྡལ།	sgang dga' grong rdal
Townships
Tashi Dzom Township	扎西宗乡	Zhāxīzōng xiāng	བཀྲ་ཤིས་འཛོམས་ཤང་།	bkra shis 'dzoms shang
Ronxar Township	绒辖乡	Róngxiá xiāng	རོང་ཤར་ཤང་།	rong shar shang
Qutang Township	曲当乡	Qǔdāng xiāng	ཆུ་ཐང་ཤང་།	chu thang shang
Cogo Township	措果乡	Cuòguǒ xiāng	མཚོ་སྒོ་ཤང་།	mtsho sgo shang
Qulho Township	曲洛乡	Qǔluò xiāng	ཆུ་ལྷོ་ཤང་།	chu lho shang
Chamco Township	长所乡	Zhǎngsuǒ xiāng	གྲམ་མཚོ་ཤང་།	gram mtsho shang
Nyixar Township	尼辖乡	Níxiá xiāng	ཉི་ཤར་ཤང་།	nyi shar shang
Zagor Township	扎果乡	Zhāguǒ xiāng	རྩ་སྐོར་ཤང་།	rtsa skor shang
Kaimar Township	克玛乡	Kèmǎ xiāng	གད་དམར་ཤང་།	gad dmar shang
Pain'gyi Township	盆吉乡	Pénjí xiāng	ཕན་སྐྱིད་ཤང་།	phan skyid shang
Gyaco Township	加措乡	Jiācuò xiāng	བརྒྱ་ཚོ་ཤང་།	brgya mtsho shang

== Demographics ==
Per the 2020 Chinese Census, Tingri County has a population of 58,173, up from the 50,818 recorded in the 2010 Chinese Census. The 2000 Chinese Census recorded a population of 46,585.

== Economy ==
Agriculture and pastoralism are major sources of employment in Tingri County.

== Transport ==
- China National Highway 318
- Shigatse Tingri Airport

== Gallery ==
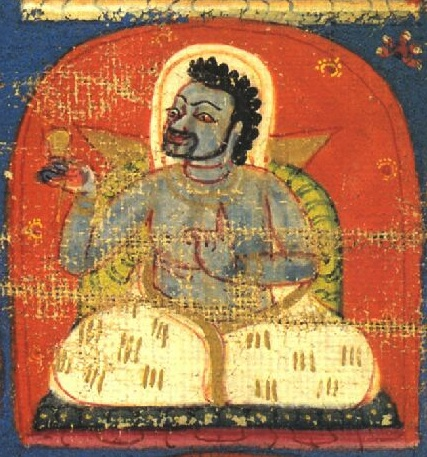
Dampa Sangye, author of the Tingri One Hundred and founder of Tingri Langkhor

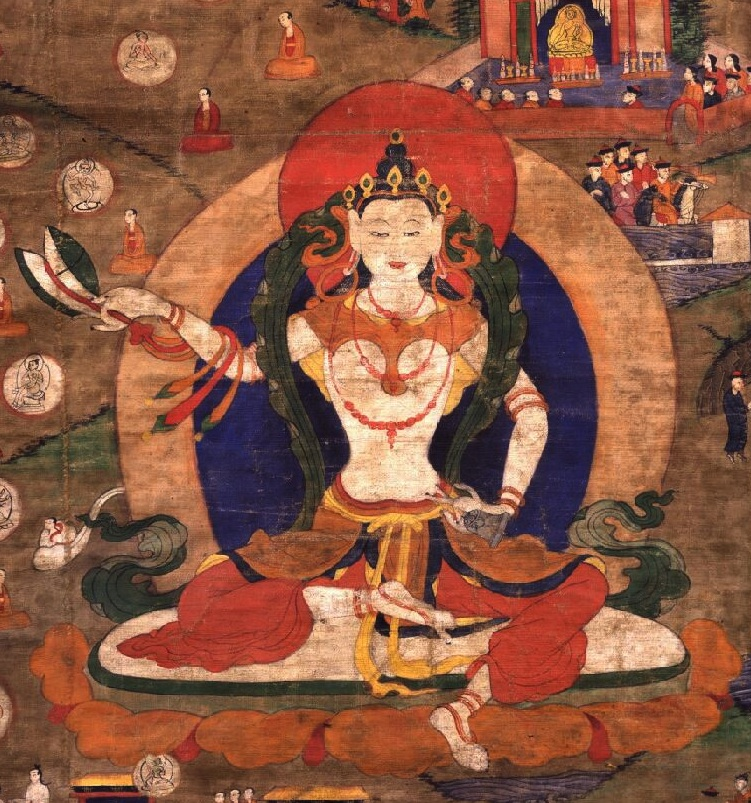
Machig Labdrön (1055–1149), student of Padampa Sanggye at Tingri Langkhor

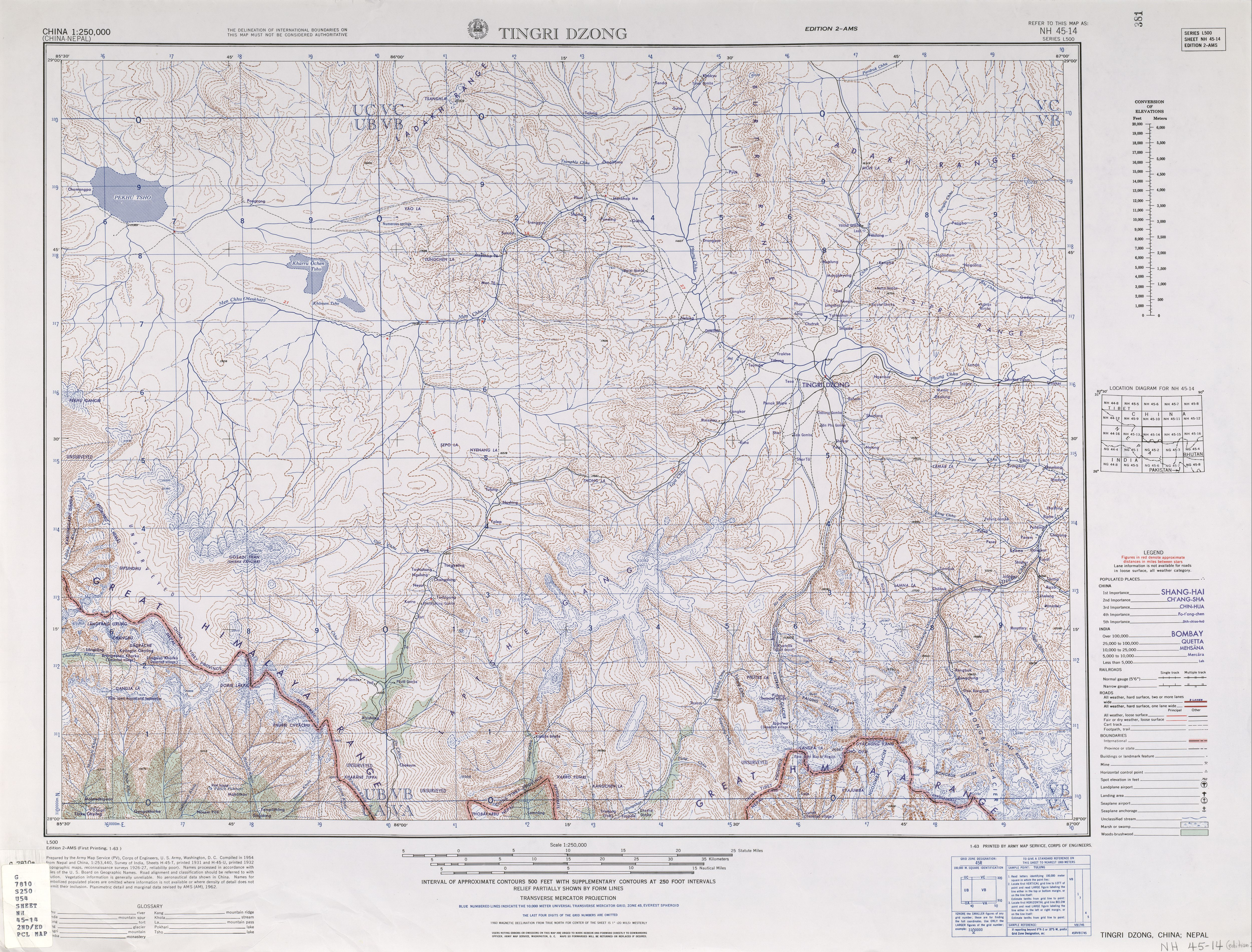
Map including Tingri (labelled as TINGRI DZONG) (1954)

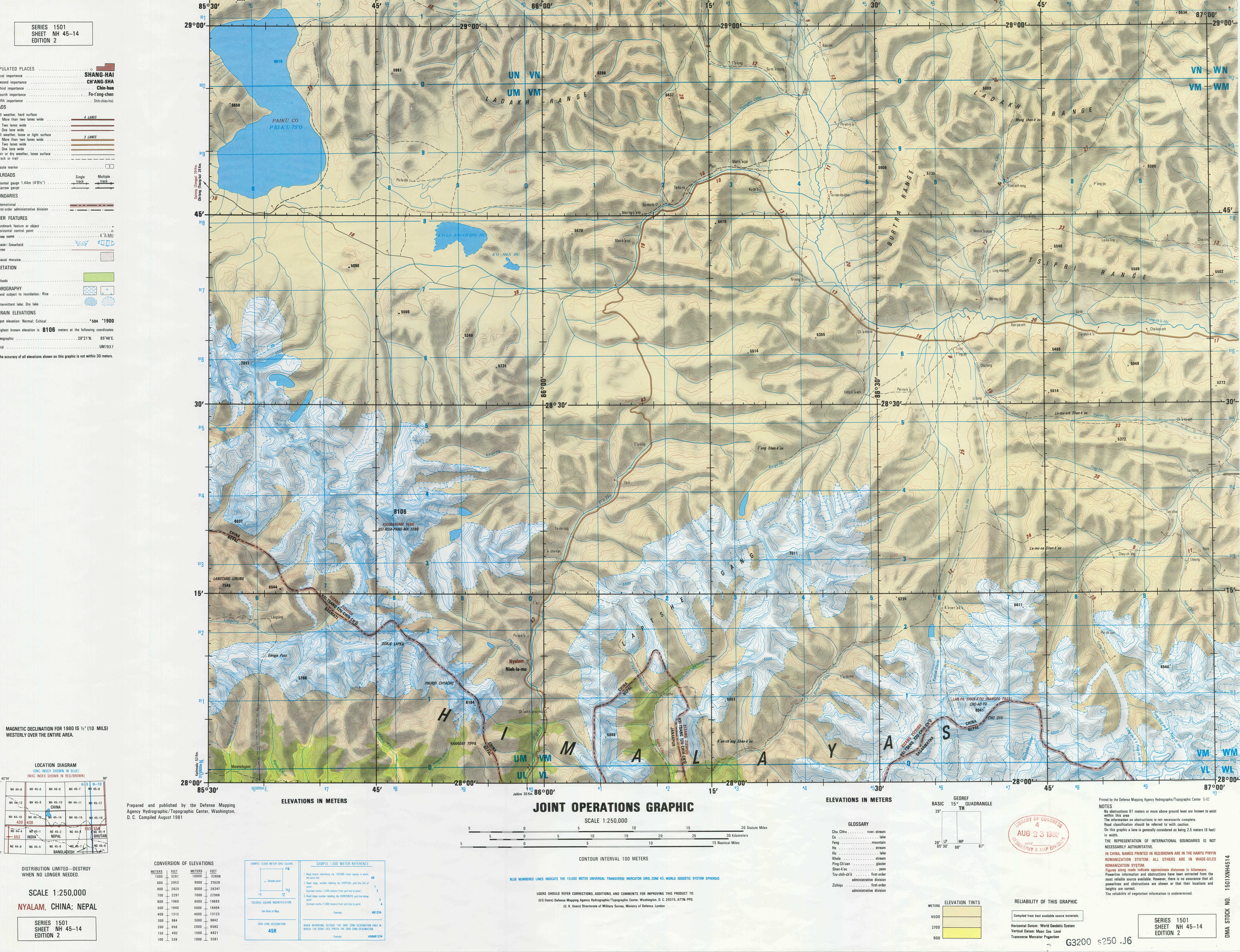
Map including Tingri (T'ing-jih) (DMA, 1981)

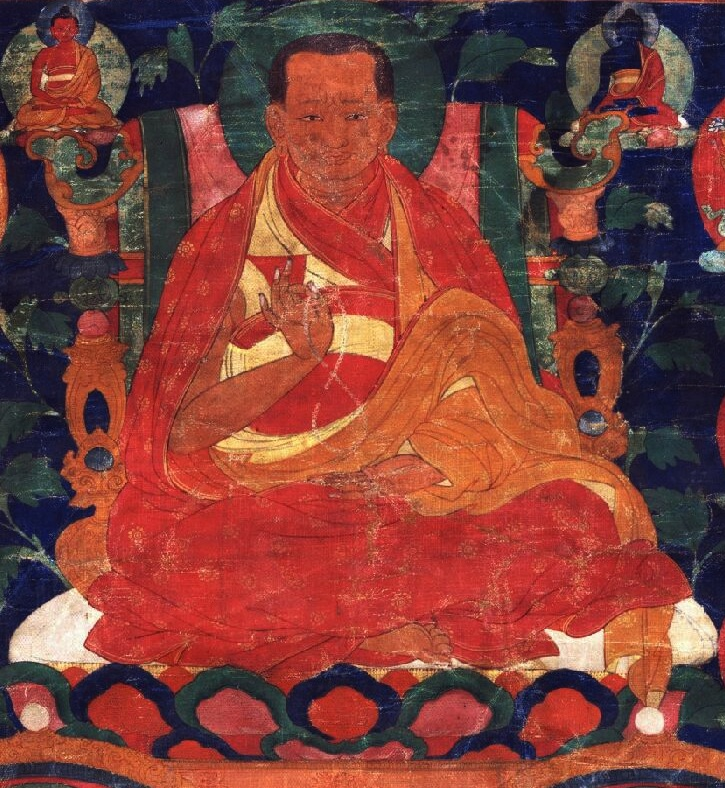
Zhangton Chobar, Lamdre practitioner, b. 1053 in Tingri County
