= Nagarze =

Nagarze may refer to places in Tibet:

- Nagarzê County, a county
- Nagarzê, Tibet, a town
