= Baidi =

Baidi may refer to:

== China ==
Places named Báidì (白地), meaning "White Land" or "Fallowland":

- Baidi (god), a Chinese deity
- Baidi Township (白地乡), a township in Nagarzê County, Tibet
  - Baidi (village), a village in Baidi Township

=== Others ===
- Baidicheng (白帝城, lit. "City of the White Emperor"), an ancient temple complex in Fengjie County, Chongqing
- Baidi people (白狄, lit. "The White Di"), an ancient tribe originally living nomadically in Shaanxi and later settled as the State of Zhongshan in Hebei
- AVIC Baidi B-Type (白帝, lit. "White Emperor"), a prototype 6th generation fighter

== Nepal ==
- Baidi, Nepal, a city in Nepal

== See also ==
- Baldi (disambiguation)
