= Taklung Monastery, Nagarzê =

Taklung Monastery
- Tibetan transcription(s); THL: Taklung Gönpa
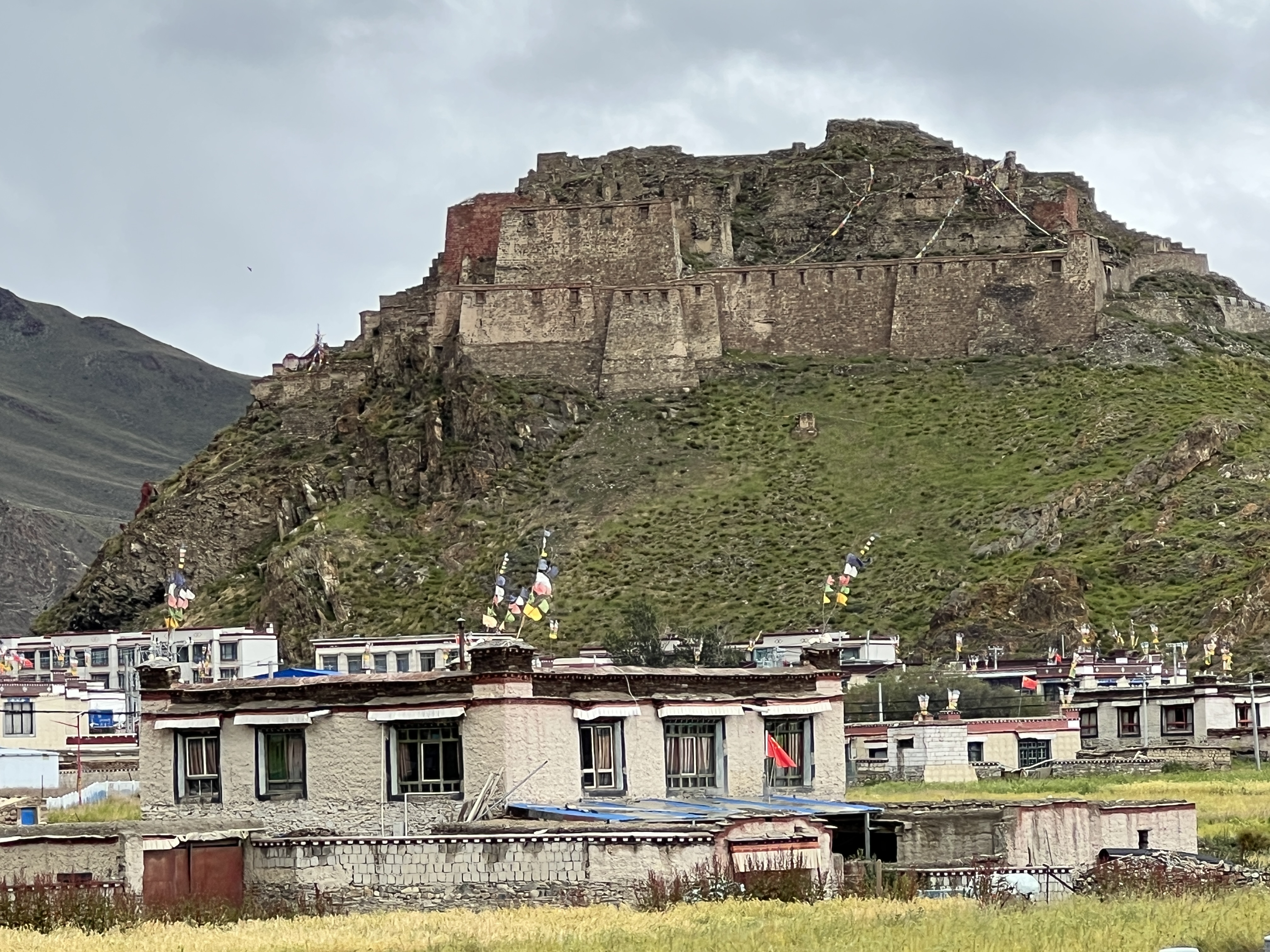
- Taklung Monastery and the hilltop fortress, possibly the original Taklung Monastery

Religion
- Affiliation: Tibetan Buddhism

Location
- Location: Taklung Town, Nagarzê County, Shannan, Tibet
- Country: China
- Interactive map of Taklung Monastery

Architecture
- Founder: Taklung Thangpa Tashi Pal
- Established: During the time of the 6th Dalai Lama (approximately the 17th–18th centuries); traditional lineage traces back to the Taklung Kagyu system founded in 1180 CE
- Elevation: 4,500 m (14,764 ft)

Taklung Monastery（Tibetan: སྟག་ལུང་དགོན་པ, Wylie: stag lung dgon pa, ZWPY: Taklung Gönpa，also rendered as Dalong Monastery, is a Tibetan Buddhism monastery located in Taklung Town, Nagarzê County, Shannan, Tibet. It stands on the summit of an east–west oriented mountain at an elevation of about 4,500 meters.

The hilltop fortress is largely in ruins and may be the original monastery founded in 1180.

== History ==
Founded in 1180 CE (Southern Song period) by Taklung Kagyu founder Taklung Thangpa Tashi Pal, a sub-school of the Kagyu (the “White School”) of Tibetan Buddhism, it is one of the principal seats of the Taklung Kagyu tradition (another is the Taklung Monastery located in Lhünzhub County near Lhasa, commonly known as “Northern Taklung,” while the one in Langkazi County is called “Southern Taklung”).
