= Baidi Township =

Baidi དབལ་དི་
- Township

Chinese transcription(s)
  - Traditional: 白地
  - Simplified: 白地
  - Pinyin: Báidì
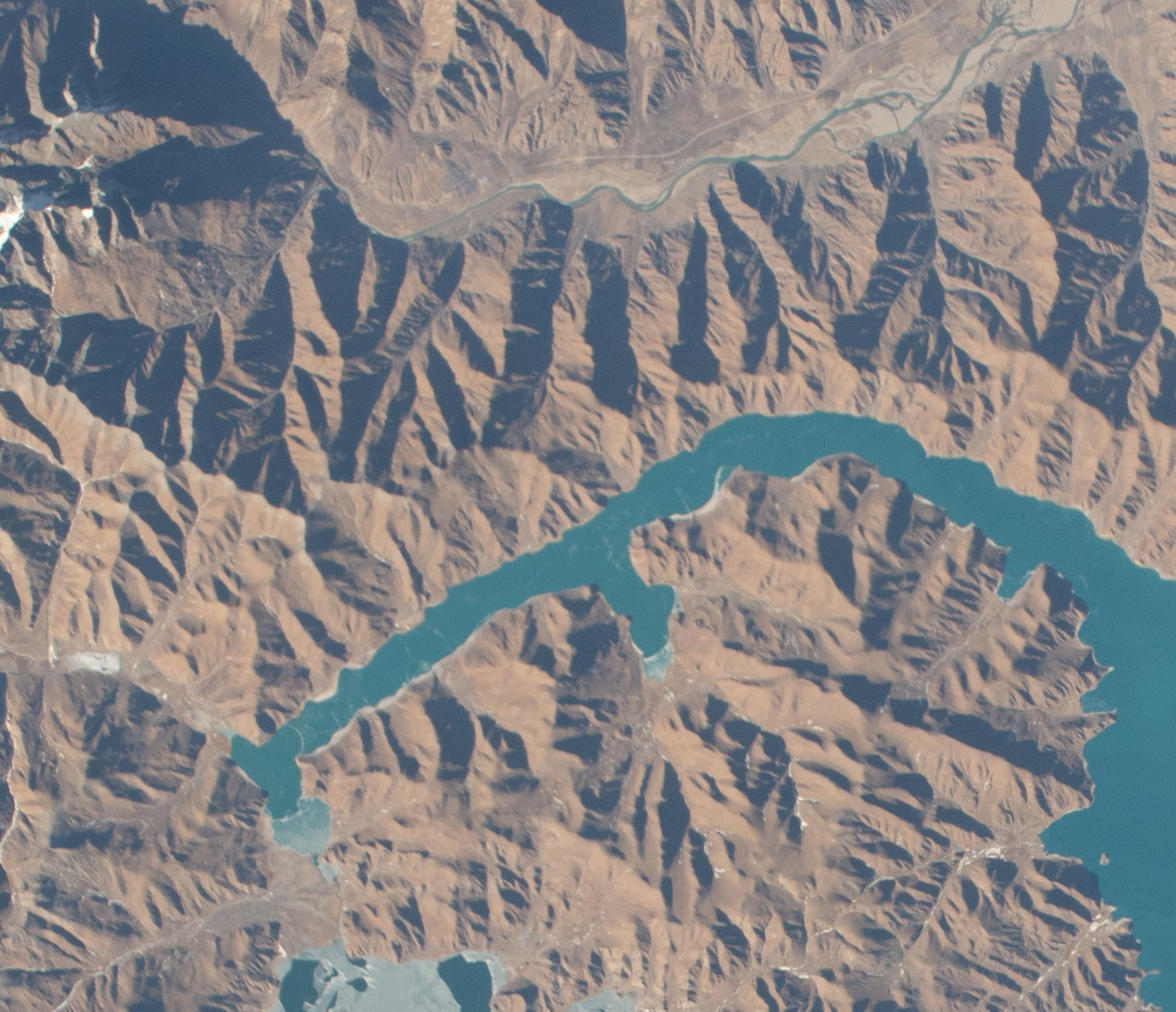
- Baidê Arm of Yamdrok Lake, the Jomo-Jobo mountains and river Yarlung Tsangpo (upper Brahmaputra)

- Location within Tibet Autonomous Region
- Coordinates: 29°8′N 90°22′E
- Country: China
- Region: Tibet Autonomous Region
- Prefecture: Shannan Prefecture
- County: Nagarzê County
- Nearby settlements (distance): Karreg; 5.3 mi (9 km) Nagarze; 11 mi (18 km); Ramba; 15.1 mi (24 km); Xoi; 18.4 mi (30 km) Ngarzhag; 18.8 mi (30 km)
- Elevation: 4,919 m (16,138 ft)

Population
  - Major Nationalities: Tibetan
  - Regional dialect: Tibetan language
- Time zone: +8

Baidi (དབལ་དི་, Chinese: 白地; Pinyin: Báidì) is a township in Nagarzê County, Shannan Prefecture, Tibet Autonomous Region of China. It lies on a lake, at an altitude of 4,919 metres (16,141 ft) and is located about 121 kilometres (75 mi) south-west of Lhasa. The village of Baidi is located in the township.

== See also ==
- List of towns and villages in Tibet
