= Baidi (village) =

Village in Tibet, China

Coordinates: 29°06′48″N 90°21′27″E

Baidi (དབལ་དི་, Chinese: 白地; pinyin: Báidì; Wade–Giles: Pai-ti) is a small village in Baidi Township, Nagarzê County, Lhoka (Shannan) Prefecture, Tibet Autonomous Region, China. It is located at the western end of Yamdrok Lake. Near the village the Yamdrok Hydropower Station, the largest power station in Tibet, was completed and dedicated in 1996.
