= Nagarzê, Tibet =

Nagarzê
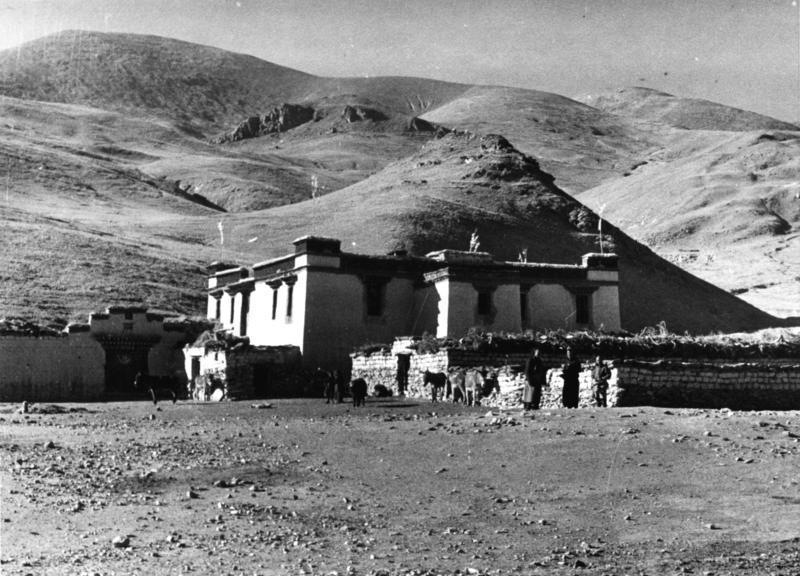
- View of Nagartsé, 1938

- Location within Tibet
- Coordinates: 28°58′N 90°24′E
- Country: China
- Region: Tibet
- Prefecture: Shannan Prefecture
- County: Nagarzê County

Population
  - Total
  - Major Nationalities: Tibetan
  - Regional dialect: Tibetan language
- Time zone: +8

Nagarzê is a township and seat of Nagarzê County in the Tibet Autonomous Region of China. It lies at an altitude of 4452 metres (14,609 feet).

== See also ==
- List of towns and villages in Tibet

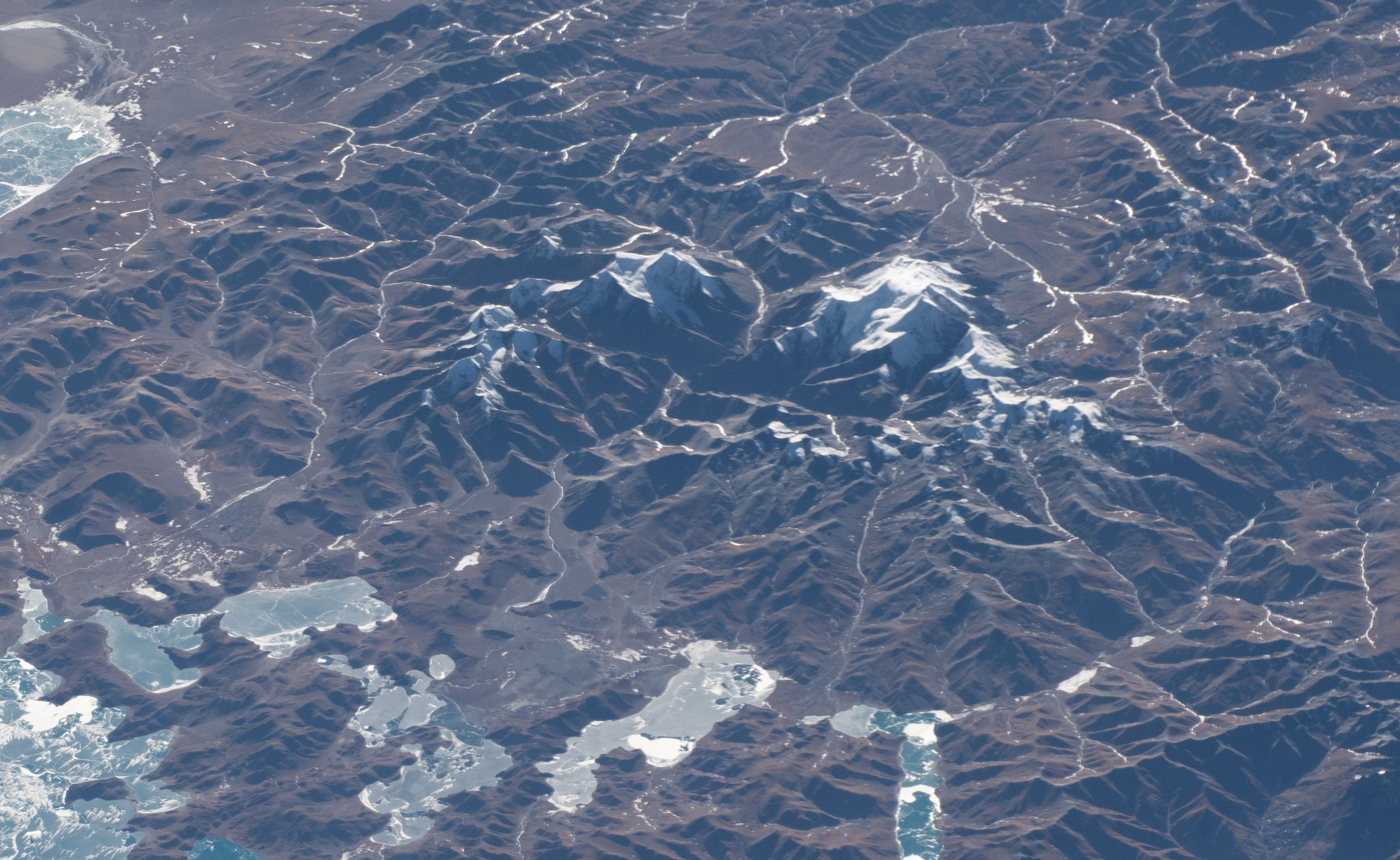
2020 photo of the region with mountains Kalurong and Noijin Kangsang, Kongmu Lake and parts of Yamdrok Lake
