= Karrêg =

Karrêg ཁ་དབྲག་ Karag
- Location within Tibet
- Coordinates: 29°15′22″N 90°24′38″E
- Country: China
- Region: Tibet
- Prefecture: Shannan Prefecture
- County: Nagarzê County

Population
  - Total
  - Major Nationalities: Tibetan
  - Regional dialect: Tibetan language
- Time zone: +8

Karreg or Karag (ཁ་དབྲག་) is a township in Nagarzê County in the Tibet Autonomous Region of China.

== See also ==
- List of towns and villages in Tibet

== External links and references ==
- Wikimapia
