= Kalurong =

Mountain in Central Tibet, China

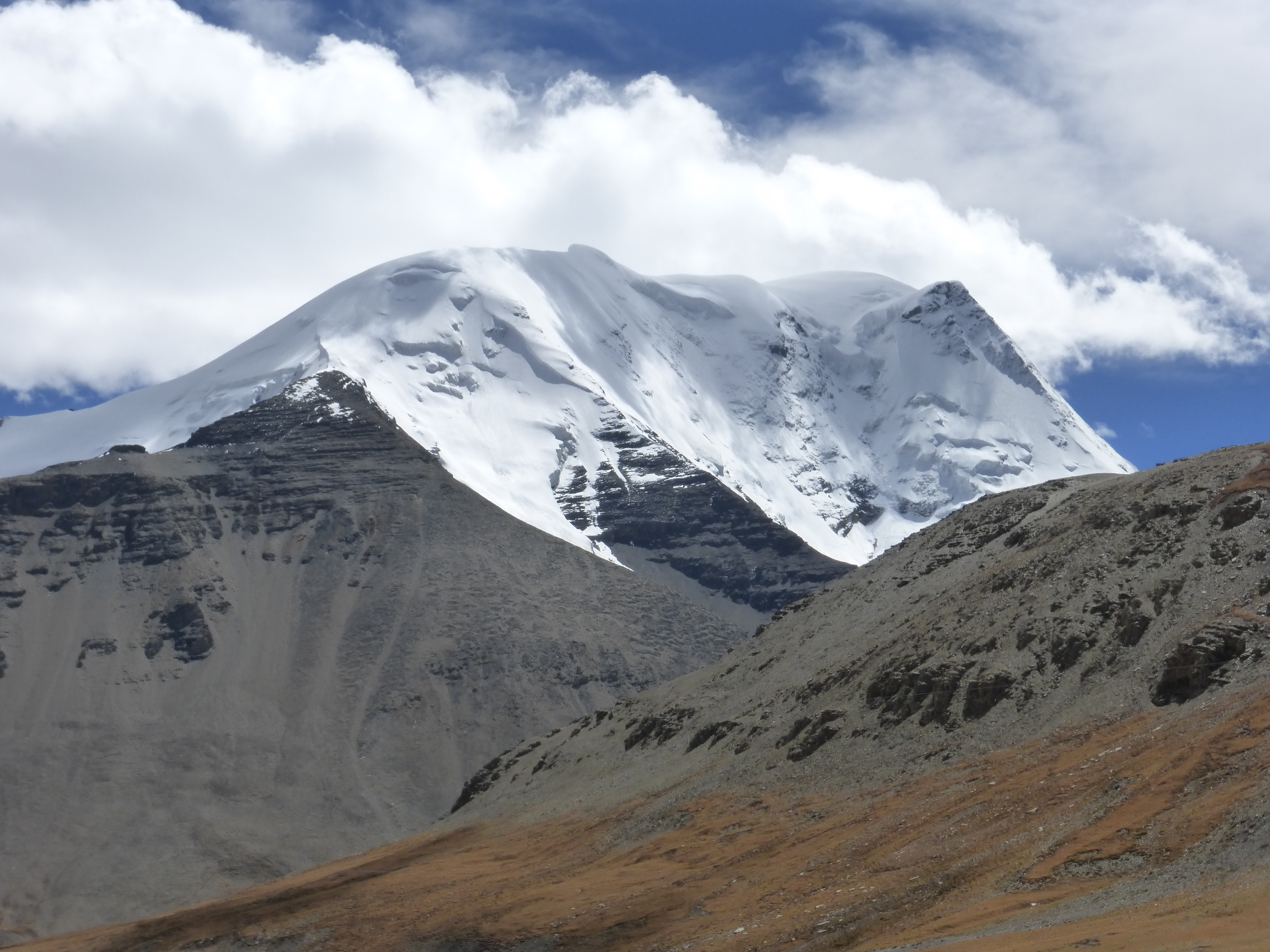
- Kalurong in Central Tibet, 26 September 2014

Highest point
- Elevation: 6,674 m (21,896 ft)
- Prominence: 1,548 m (5,079 ft)
- Coordinates: 28°50′13″N 90°13′10″E

Geography
- Location within China Location within Tibet
- Location: Tibet/China

Climbing
- First ascent: No Records

Kalurong or Kalaxung is a mountain located in the Tibet Autonomous Region of China. It is a part of Lhagoi Kangri belt, which is a heteroclite juxtaposition of subranges that is compressed between the Yarlung Tsangpo (Brahmaputra River) river to the north and the Assam Himalaya to the south.

== Location ==
The mountain has two summits — Kalurong North, which is located at 6,674 m (21,896 ft) above sea level and Kalurong South, which is located at 6,536 m (21,444 ft). The superstructure of the mountain is in Central Tibet, south of the Karo La pass. Both the summits are connected through a saddle at 6,314 m (20,715 ft).

== Climbing history ==
In September 2005, a Japanese expedition led by the Keio University Alpine Club made the mountain's first ascent.
