= Nagarzê County =

Nagarzê County 浪卡子县 • སྣ་དཀར་རྩེ་རྫོང་།
- County
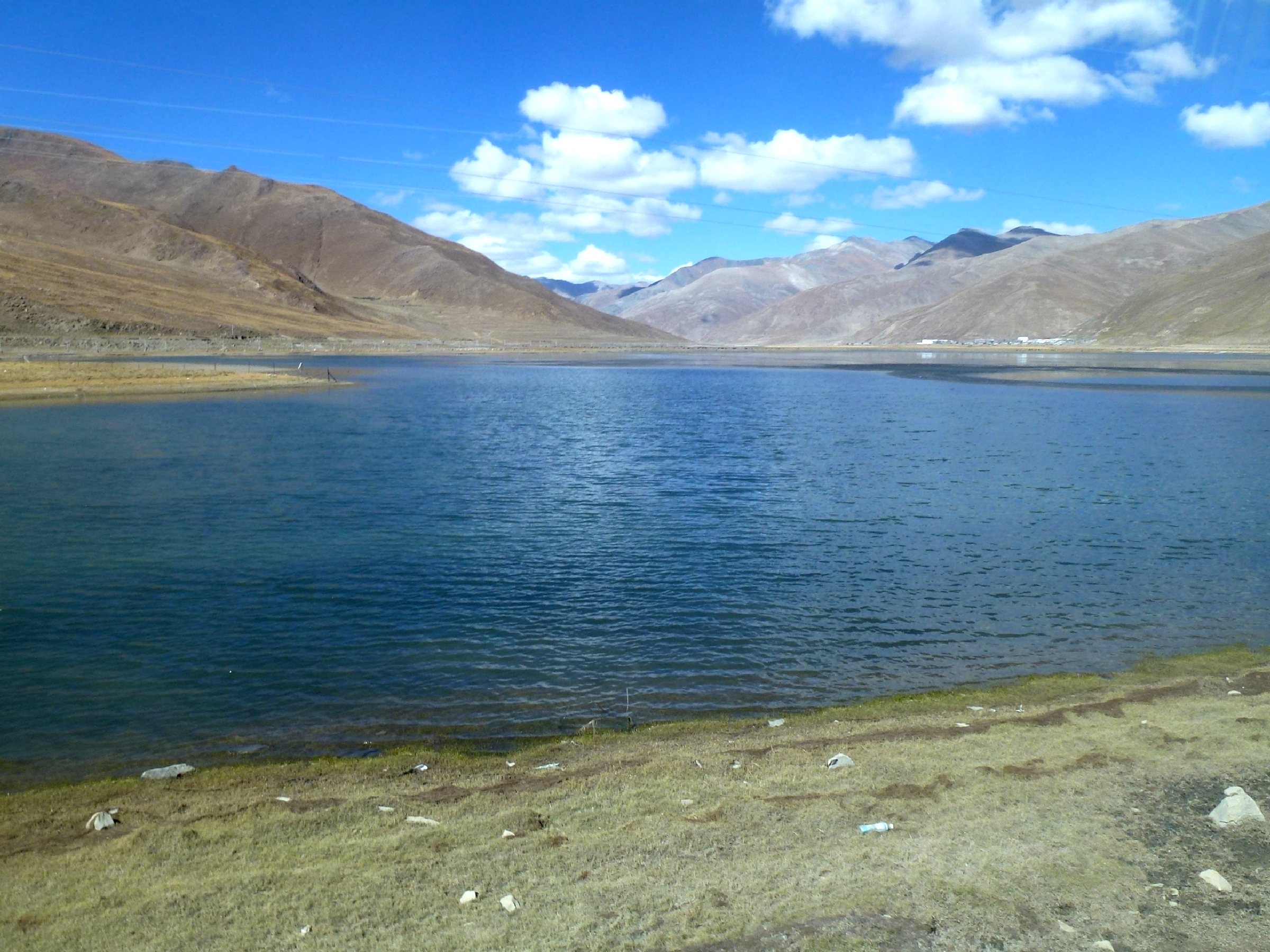

- Location of the seat in Tibet Nagarzê (China)
- Coordinates: 28°51′03″N 90°55′21″E
- Country: China
- Autonomous region: Tibet
- Prefecture-level city: Shannan (Lhoka)
- County seat: Nagarzê

Area
  - Total: 7,969.89 km^{2} (3,077.19 sq mi)
- Elevation: 4,300–5,000 m (14,100–16,400 ft)

Population (2020)
  - Total: 32,835
  - Density: 4.1199/km^{2} (10.670/sq mi)
- Time zone: UTC+8 (China Standard)
- Website: www.langkazi.gov.cn

Nagarzê County

Chinese name
- Simplified Chinese: 浪卡子县
- Traditional Chinese: 浪卡子縣
Transcriptions
Standard Mandarin
- Hanyu Pinyin: Làngkǎzǐ Xiàn

Tibetan name
- Tibetan: སྣ་དཀར་རྩེ་རྫོང་།
Transcriptions
- Wylie: sna dkar rtse rdzong
- Tibetan Pinyin: Nagarzê Zong

Nagarzê County (Tibetan: སྣ་དཀར་རྩེ་རྫོང་།, Chinese: 浪卡子县) is a county of Shannan located in the south-east of the Tibet Autonomous Region, China. The Yarlung Tsangpo river dominates the county. Baidi Township is located in the county.

== History ==
Historically, the area governed by Nagarzê County was collectively known as "Yangzho" (Tibetan: ཡངས་འབྲོག་, meaning "Upper Pasture").

During the Tang dynasty (618–907 CE), when the 32nd Tibetan King Songtsen Gampo established the Tibetan Empire, this region was incorporated into the military-administrative division "Yoru" (约茹) and named "Yangzho Kangqing Buren Di Ayu" (Tibetan: ཡངས་འབྲོག་ཁང་ཆེན་བུ་རིན་དི་ཨ་ཡུལ་), meaning "The Five Yak-Nurturing Homelands in the Snowy Upper Pasture". In the Yuan dynasty (1271–1368), the central government appointed leaders of the Sakya school of Tibetan Buddhism to administer Tibet, establishing the Yangzho Ten-thousand Household Office (羊卓万户府) within Nagarzê's jurisdiction.

During the Ming dynasty (1368–1644), the Phagmodrupa regime (Chinese: 帕竹政权), supported by the Ming court, established Nagarzê Dzong (浪卡子宗) to govern the Yangzho region.

In 1954, the Tibetan government divided the area into three administrative units: Nagarzê Dzong, Baid Dzong (白地宗), and Daglung Dzong (打隆宗), all under the jurisdiction of Lhoka Gigu (洛喀基巧, Governor of Southern Tibet). Following “democratic reforms” in 1959, the Preparatory Committee of the Tibet Autonomous Region merged Langdzê Dzong (朗格则宗) and Baid Dzong into Nagarzê County, while establishing Daglung County (打隆县) through the merger of Daglung and Linggu (岭谷), both placed under Gyantse Prefecture (江孜专区). In February 1964, Daglung County was incorporated into Nagarzê County and transferred to Lhoka Prefecture (山南专区), where it remains administratively today.

== Administrative divisions ==
Nagarzê County contains 2 towns and 8 townships.

Name	Chinese	Hanyu Pinyin	Tibetan	Wylie
Towns
Nagarzê Town	浪卡子镇	Làngkǎzǐ zhèn	སྣ་དཀར་རྩེ་གྲོང་རྡལ།	sna dkar rtse grong rdal
Daglung Town	打隆镇	Dǎlóng zhèn	སྟག་ལུང་གྲོང་རྡལ།	stag lung grong rdal
Townships
Chamda Township	张达乡	Zhāngdá xiāng	གྲམ་མདའ་ཤང་།	gram mda' shang
Lhülpozhöl Township	伦布雪乡	Lúnbùxuě xiāng	ལྷུན་པོ་ཞོལ་ཤང་།	lhun po zhol shang
Doqoi Township	多却乡	Duōquè xiāng	མདོ་ཆོས་ཤང་།	mdo chos shang
Puma Jangtang Township	普玛江塘乡	Pǔmǎjiāngtáng xiāng	ཕུ་མ་བྱང་ཐང་ཤང་།	phu ma byang thang shang
Ngardrak Township	阿扎乡	Āzhā xiāng	མངར་བྲག་ཤང་།	mngar brag shang
Karlung Township	卡龙乡	Kǎlóng xiāng	མཁར་ལུང་ཤང་།	mkhar lung shang
Baidi Township	白地乡	Báidì xiāng	དབལ་དི་ཤང་།	dpal di shang
Karrêg Township	卡热乡	Kǎrè xiāng	ཁ་དབྲག་ཤང་།	kha dbrag shang

== Climate ==
Climate data for Nagarzê, elevation 4,432 m (14,541 ft), (1991–2020 normals)
Month	Jan	Feb	Mar	Apr	May	Jun	Jul	Aug	Sep	Oct	Nov	Dec	Year
Mean daily maximum °C (°F)	2.7 (36.9)	4.0 (39.2)	6.6 (43.9)	9.7 (49.5)	13.3 (55.9)	16.6 (61.9)	16.1 (61.0)	15.4 (59.7)	14.1 (57.4)	11.4 (52.5)	7.3 (45.1)	4.6 (40.3)	10.2 (50.3)
Daily mean °C (°F)	−4.3 (24.3)	−2.8 (27.0)	−0.1 (31.8)	2.7 (36.9)	6.4 (43.5)	10.1 (50.2)	10.4 (50.7)	9.8 (49.6)	8.0 (46.4)	4.0 (39.2)	−0.2 (31.6)	−2.7 (27.1)	3.4 (38.2)
Mean daily minimum °C (°F)	−11.2 (11.8)	−9.8 (14.4)	−6.4 (20.5)	−3.3 (26.1)	0.2 (32.4)	4.3 (39.7)	6.1 (43.0)	5.6 (42.1)	2.9 (37.2)	−2.5 (27.5)	−6.9 (19.6)	−9.5 (14.9)	−2.5 (27.4)
Average precipitation mm (inches)	0.4 (0.02)	0.9 (0.04)	2.7 (0.11)	9.0 (0.35)	22.3 (0.88)	49.9 (1.96)	122.0 (4.80)	119.3 (4.70)	50.8 (2.00)	7.7 (0.30)	1.3 (0.05)	0.6 (0.02)	386.9 (15.23)
Average precipitation days (≥ 0.1 mm)	0.5	0.9	2.7	5.8	8.7	14.4	21.5	22.2	15.4	3.1	0.8	0.3	96.3
Average snowy days	2.1	3.8	6.9	11.3	11.3	1.1	0.1	0.2	1.2	4.6	2.1	1.4	46.1
Average relative humidity (%)	23	25	31	40	48	57	68	71	67	47	30	23	44
Mean monthly sunshine hours	258.8	235.0	257.7	250.7	257.2	228.5	179.5	176.0	204.1	267.8	272.3	269.3	2,856.9
Percentage possible sunshine	79	74	69	65	61	55	42	44	56	76	86	85	66
Source: China Meteorological Administration

== Gallery ==
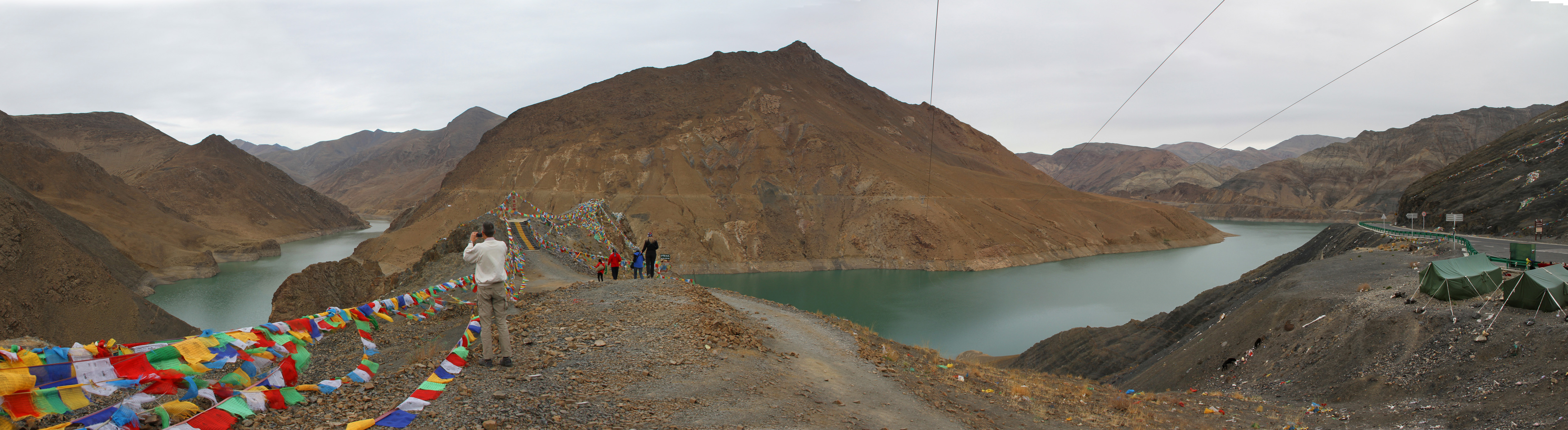
Lake at Sim La

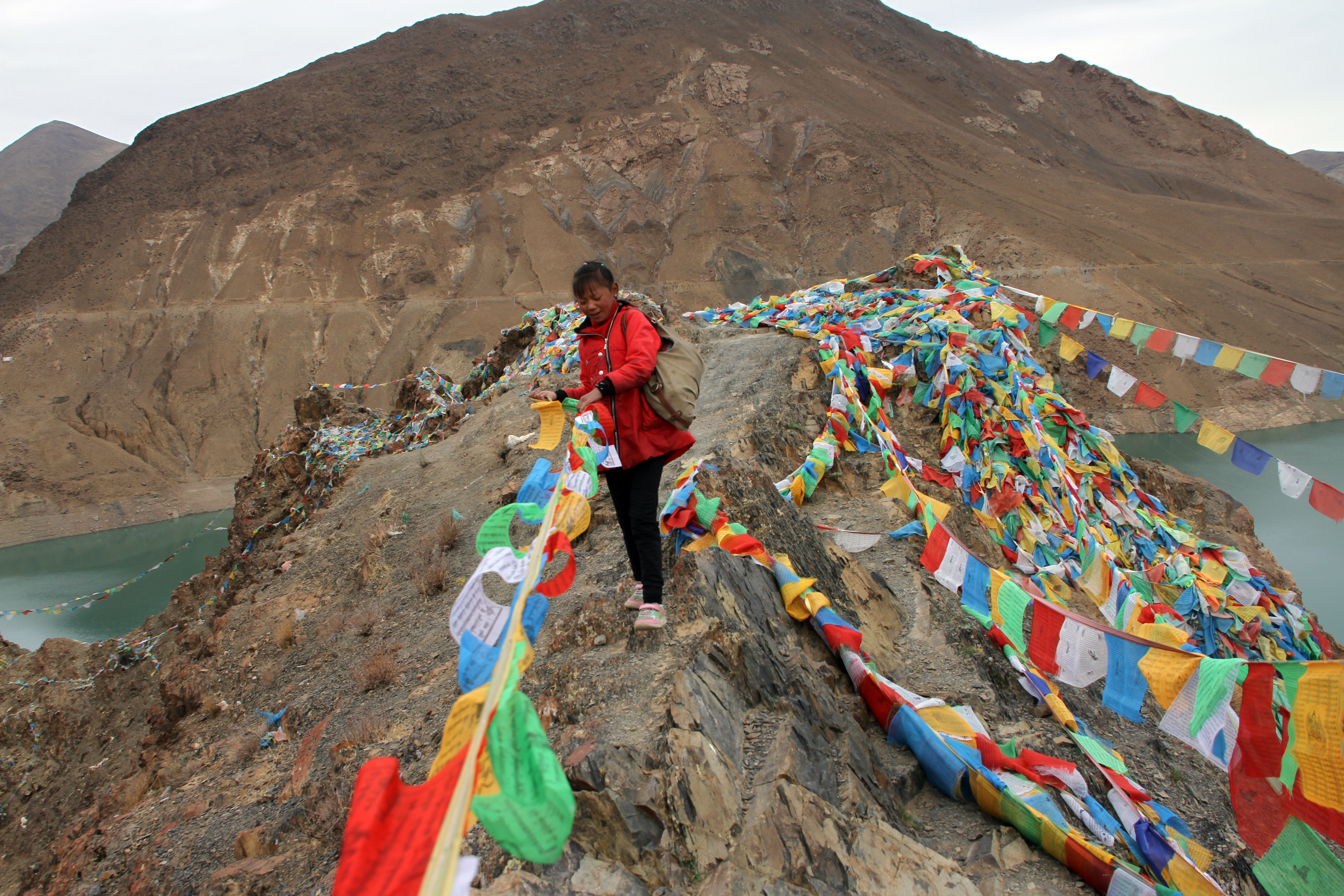
Sim La 4330m

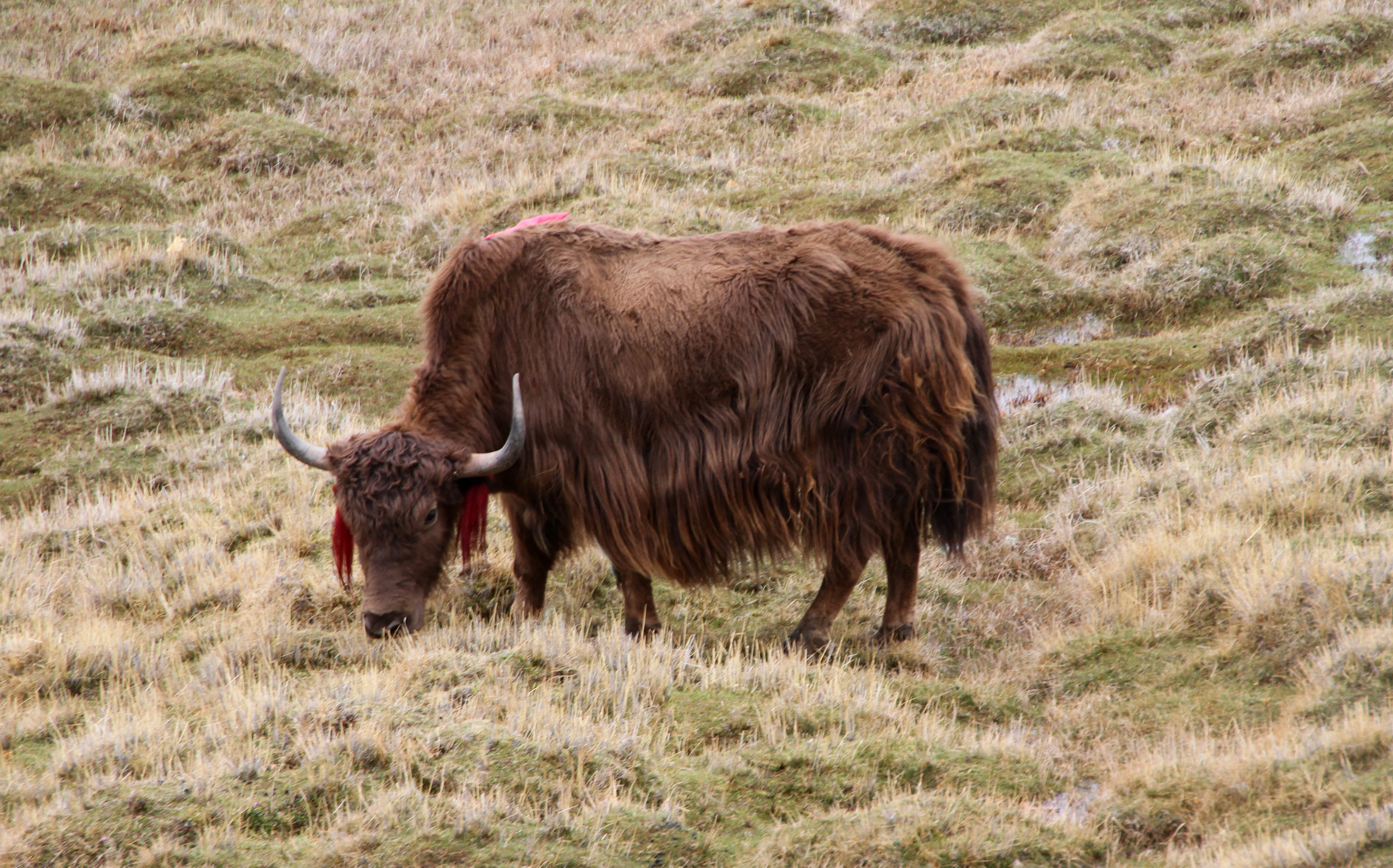
Yak

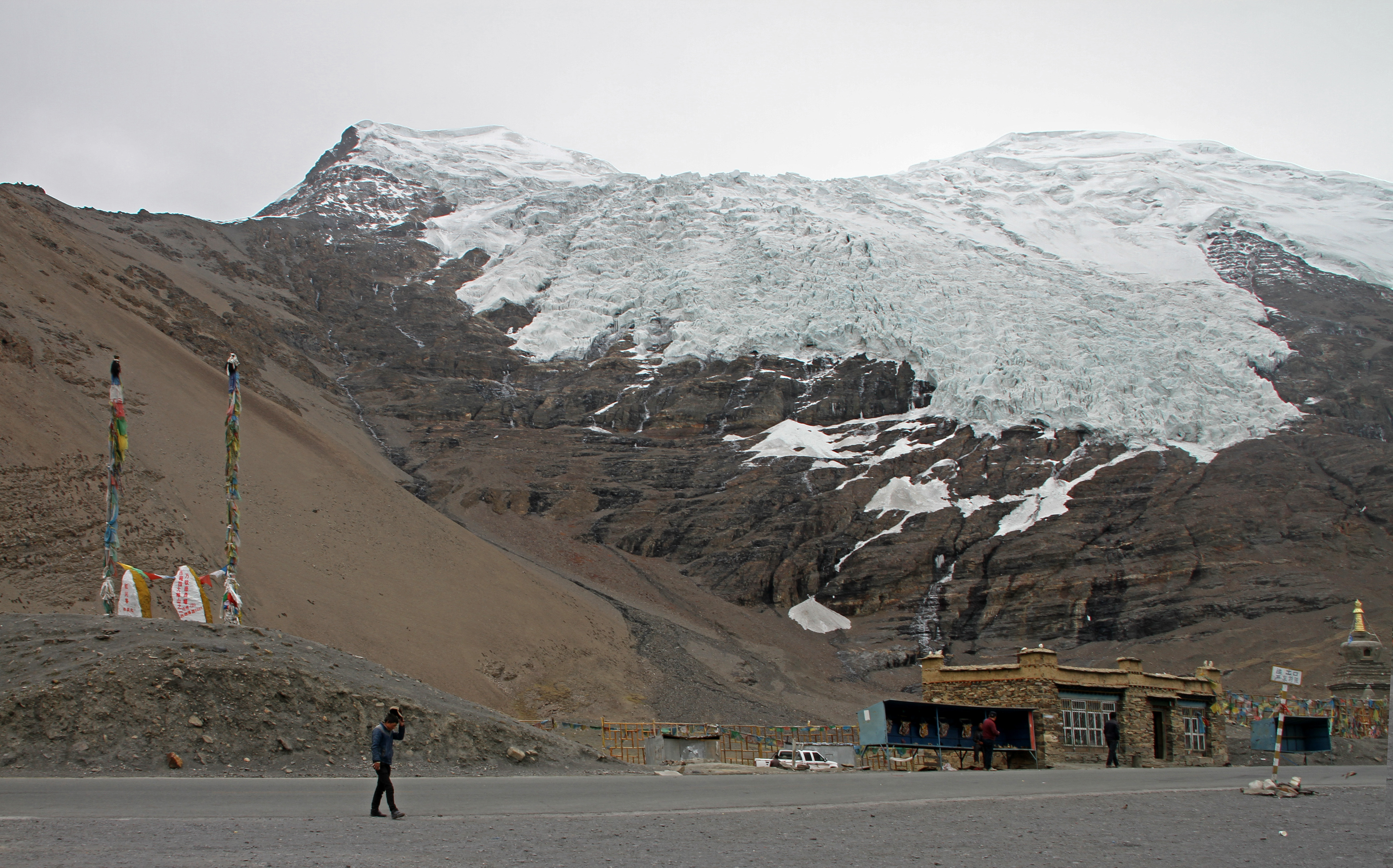
Karo La-Glacier

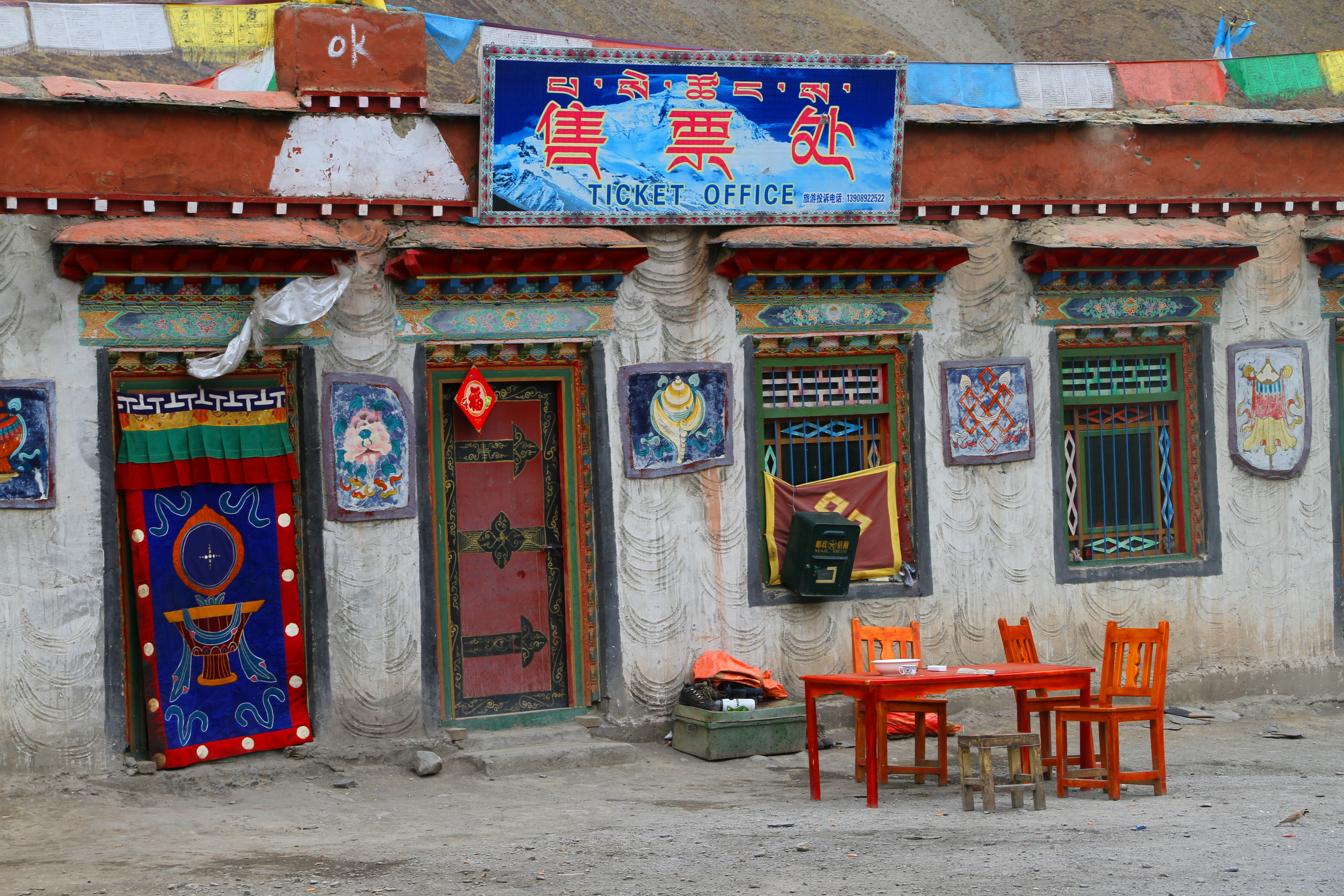
Karo La 5030m

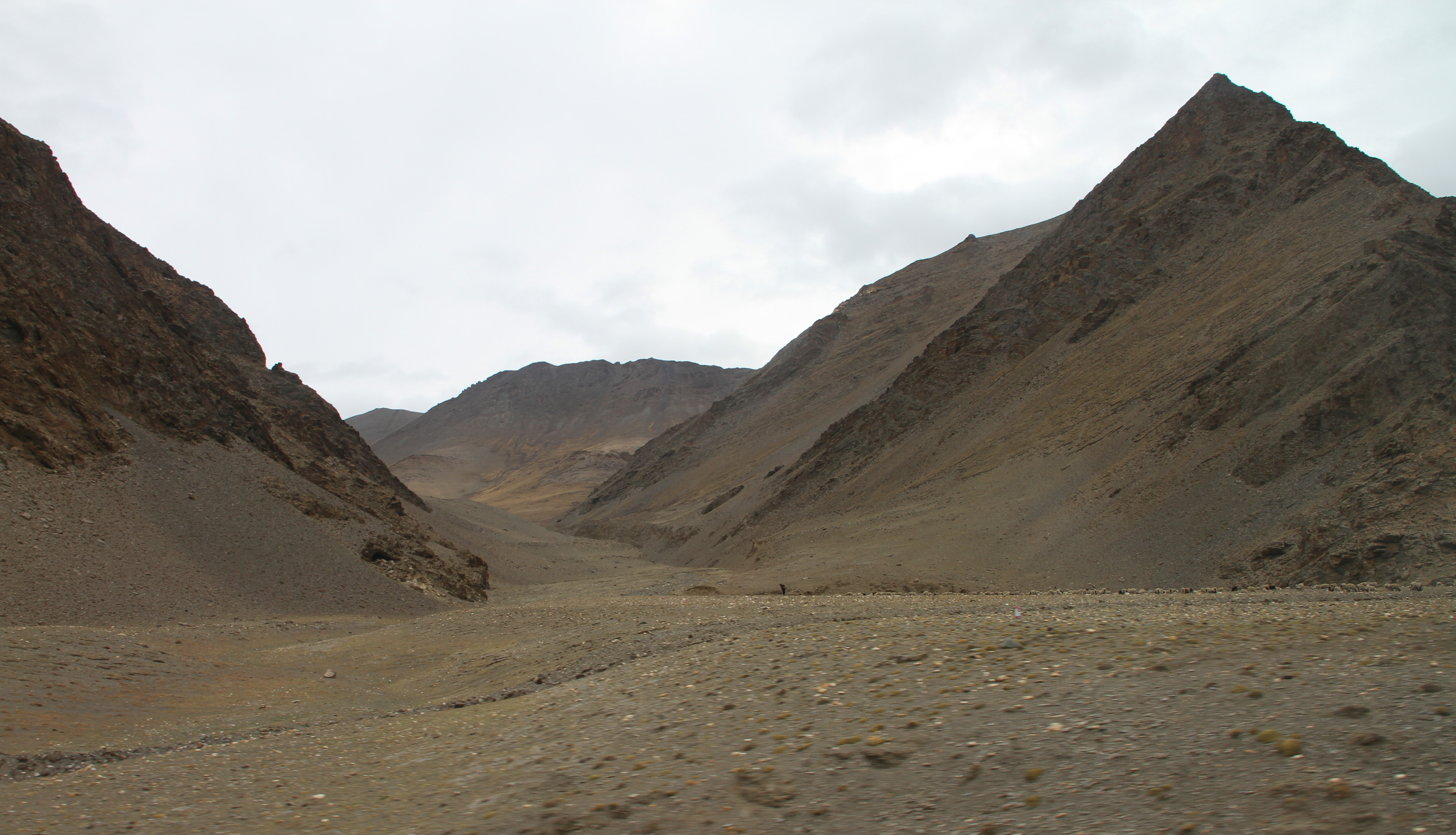
Sheep

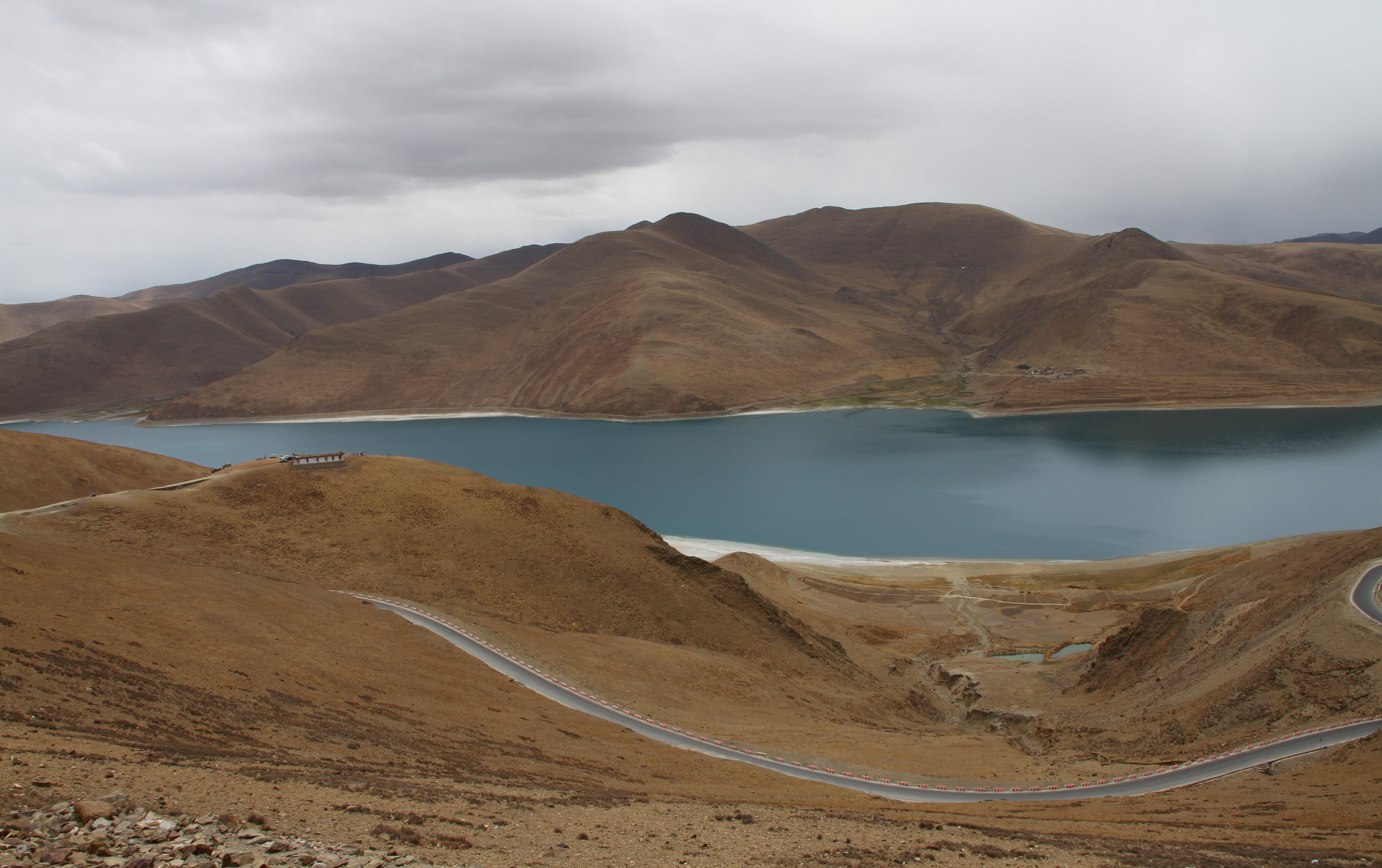
Yamdrok Tso

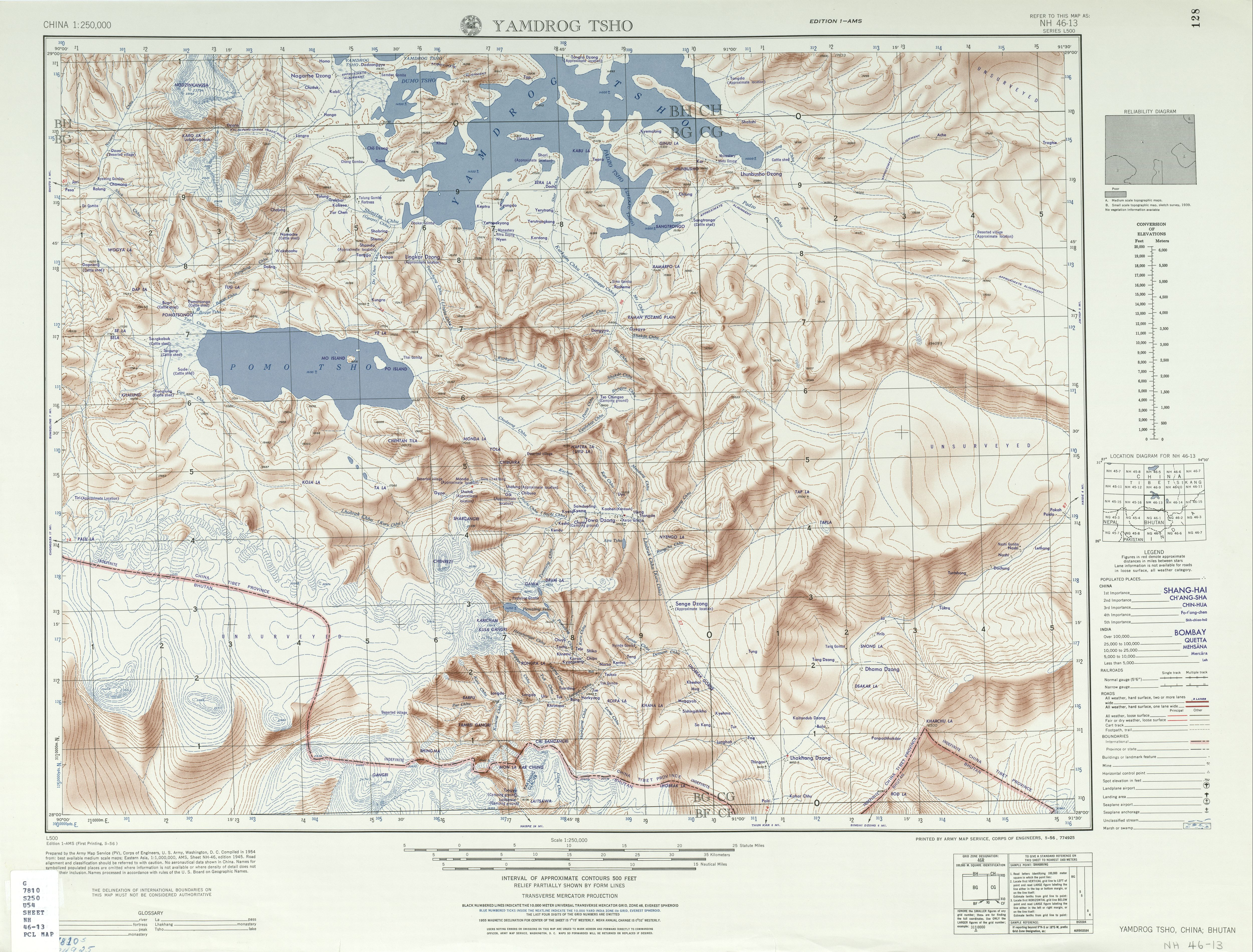
Yamdrok Lake (labelled as YAMDROG TSHO) (1954)
