= Comai =

Comai may refer to:

- Comai County, county in Tibet
- Comai (village), village in Tibet
