= Nyêmo Chekar monastery =

Tibetan Buddhist monastery in Nyêmo County, Tibet, China

Nyêmo Chekar
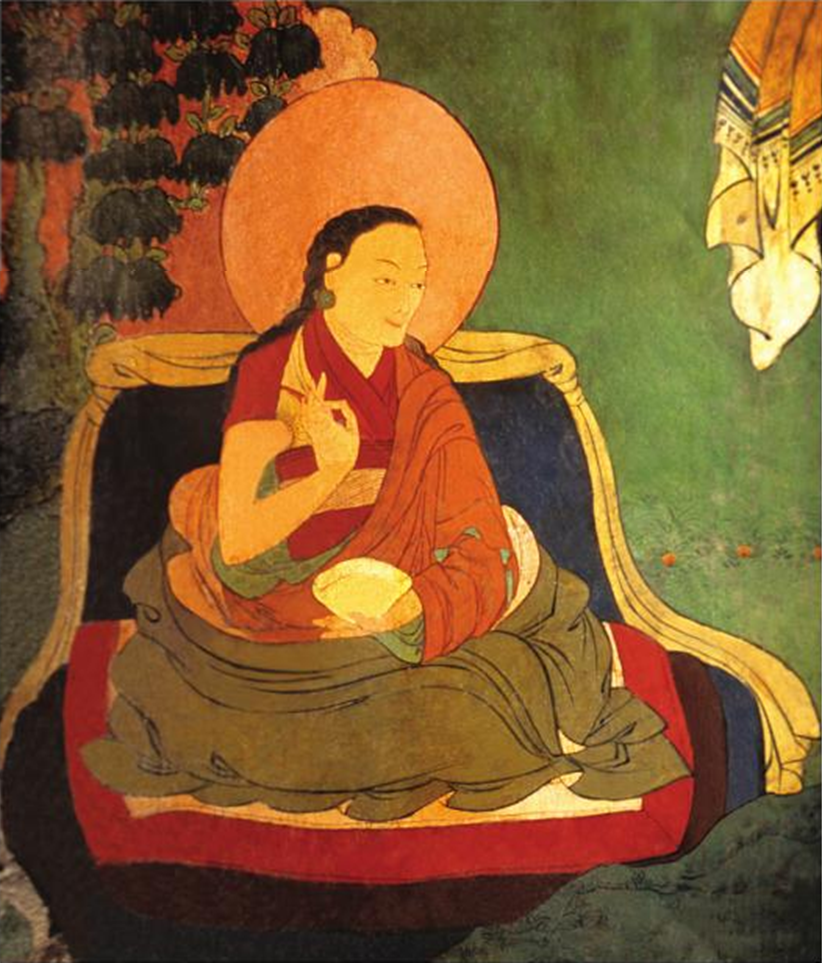
- Chökyi Drönma. Mural painting at Neymo Chekar monastery.

Monastery information
- Order: Bodongpa tradition of Buddhism

Site
- Location: Nyêmo County, Lhasa, Tibet

Nyêmo Chekar monastery (Standard Tibetan: snye mo bye dkar) ཉེ་མོ་ཆེ་དཀར་དགོན། is a small Buddhist monastery of the Bodongpa tradition in Nyêmo County, Lhasa, Tibet. It is known for its mural paintings of reincarnations of the Samding Dorje Phagmo.

== Location ==
Nyemo Chekar lies near Uyuk in Nyêmo County. It is the birthplace of 8th century "translator" Vairotsana. The name comes from an area of chekar (bye dkar), or white sand, that surrounds the monastery. The monastery was established in the 16th century by Tashi Ombar, protector of the Bodongpa tradition, and Chime Palsang, spiritual master of the tradition. A visitor to the monastery in July 1996 described it as small and somewhat decrepit. It stood on a mound above a grove of willows and a small stream.

== Paintings ==
The old wall paintings in the porch of the temple had been repainted by 1996. In a dark altar room on the ground floor the walls are completely decorated with much older portraits that included Bodong Chogle Namgyal (1376–1451), the deity Dorje Phagmo and Tashi Ombar, the blue horseman who protects the Bodongpa tradition. One of the better-preserved upper rooms also has fully decorated walls, including formal portraits of Bodong Chogle Namgyal, Chökyi Drönma (the first incarnation of Dorje Phagmo) and Chime Palsang. It has various other pictures of women, some remarkably realistic. One depicts the princess Chökyi Drönma in a nun's garb, with a yogini's long hair hanging loose, wearing gold and turquoise earrings. Although unnamed, most of the female portraits appear to represent different reincarnations of the Dorje Phagmo. They probably date from the late 16th or early 17th century.

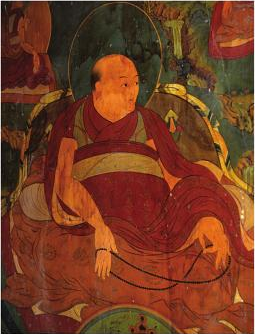
Late 16th century mural depicting Chime Palsang

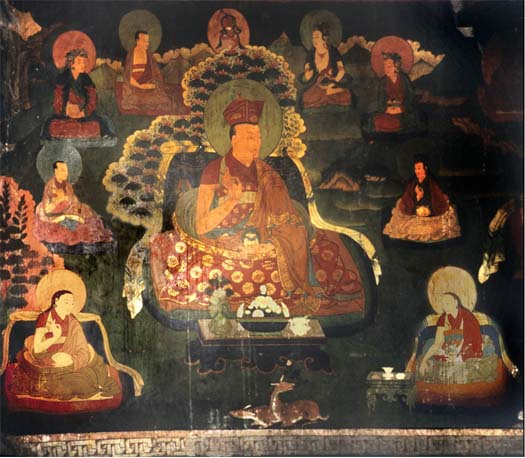
The Fourth Red Hat Karmapa and several incarnations of the Dorje Phagmo

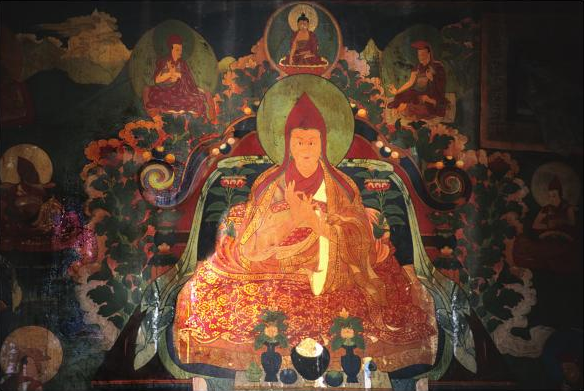
Bodong Chogle Namgyal

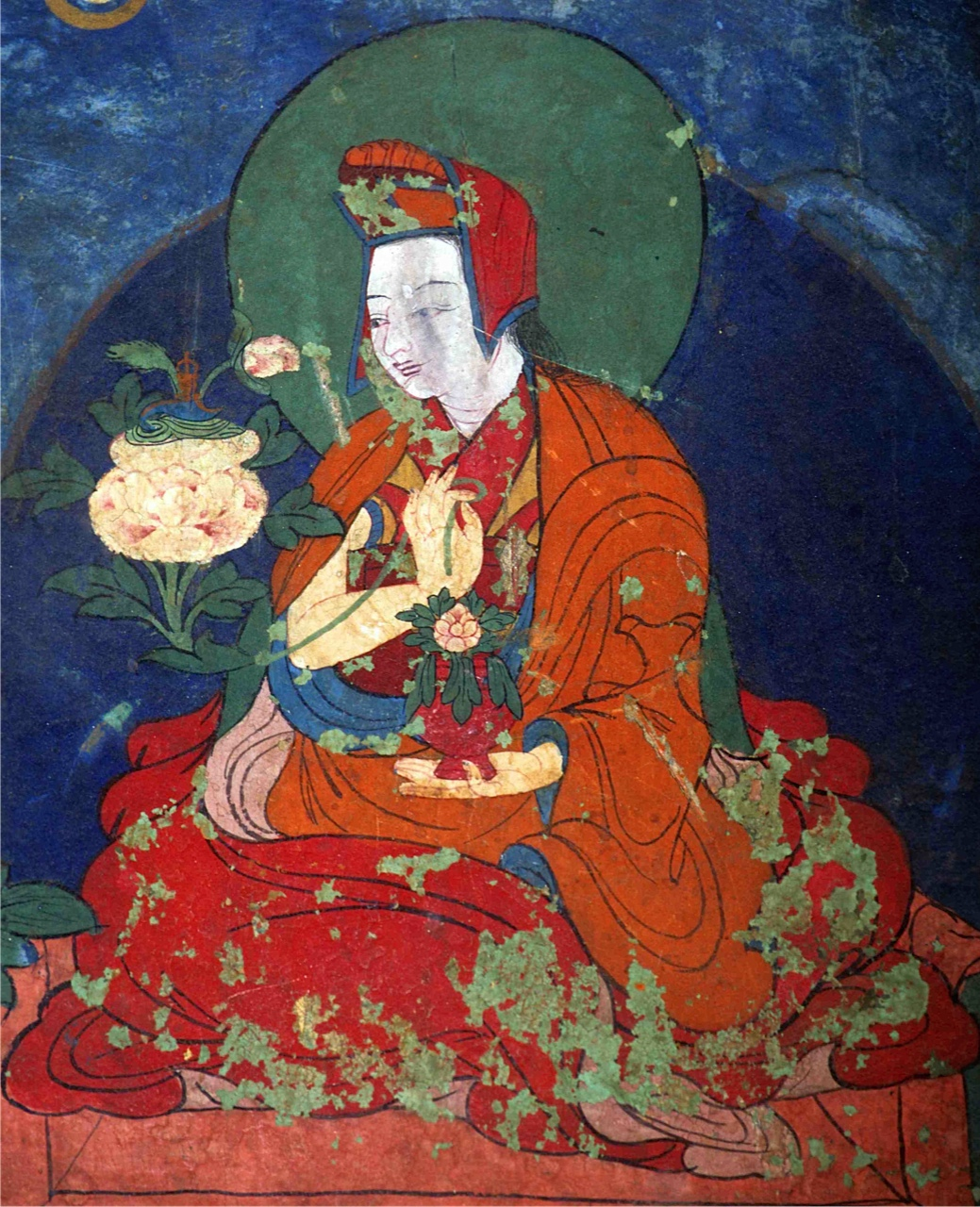
The first Samding Dorje Phagmo, Chökyi Drönma

== Sources ==
- Diemberger, Hildegard (2014-03-04). When a Woman Becomes a Religious Dynasty: The Samding Dorje Phagmo of Tibet. Columbia University Press. ISBN 978-0-231-14321-9.
- Yudra Nyingpo (2004). The Great Image: The Life Story of Vairochana, the Translator. Translated by Ani Jinba Palmo. Shambhala Publications. ISBN 978-1-59030-069-5.
