= Chökyi Drönma =

1st Samding Dorje Phagmo

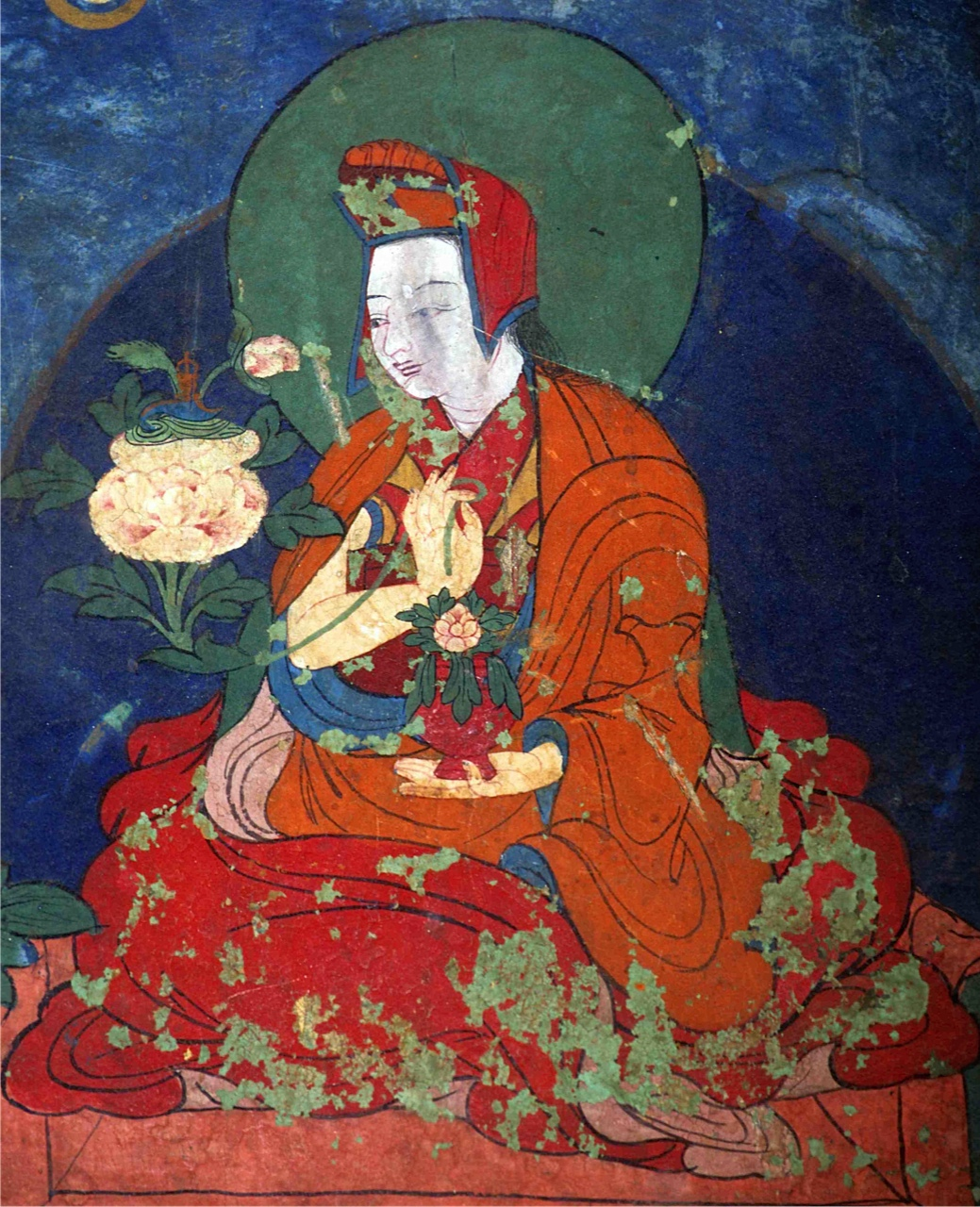
- Mural painting of Chökyi Drönma at the Nyêmo Chekar monastery
- Title: Samding Dorje Phagmo

Personal life
- Born: 1422 Mangyül Gungthang
- Died: 1455 (aged 32–33) Manmogang Monastery

Religious life
- Religion: Tibetan Buddhism
- School: Bodongpa
- Lineage: Vajravārāhī

Senior posting
- Successor: Kunga Zangmo
- Reincarnation: Machig Labdrön

Chökyi Drönma (Tibetan: ཆོས་ཀྱི་སྒྲོན་མེ, Wylie: chos-kyi sgron-me, 1422-1455) was a Tibetan princess and Buddhist leader. She was the main consort of Thang Tong Gyalpo, who recognized her as an emanation of Machig Labdrön through the lineage of Vajravārāhī and appointed her as the first Samding Dorje Phagmo.

== Biography ==
Chökyi Drönma was born in 1422 as the daughter of Thri Lhawang Gyaltsen, the king of Mangyül Gungthang. In 1438 she married a prince from the Southern Tibetan Kingdom of Lato in order to create an alliance between Gungthang and Lato. In 1440, she gave birth to a daughter. When her daughter was old enough to begin schooling, Drönma negotiated with her husband to have her educated according to Buddhist principals. A few years later she returned to Gungthang with an army to assist in an on-going conflict. While she was away her daughter died. After her death, Drönma formally announced her desire to take religious vows, to which her family refused.

She became a student of Thang Tong Gyalpo and, eventually, his main consort. Gyalpo reportedly recognized her as the incarnation of Machig Labdrön through the lineage of Vajravārāhī. As part of her relationship with Gyalpo, Drönma received the complete teachings of the Heart Practice (thugs sgrub) of treasure teachings from Trasang (bkra bzang gter kha), as well as Chöd (teachings of Machig Labdrön and Mahāmudrā) instructions from him.

She became the first Samding Dorje Phagmo, the highest-ranking female Tulku in Tibet and the third highest-ranking Buddhist leader after the Dalai Lama and the Panchen Lama. As Samding Dorje Phagmo, she contributed to art, architecture, and engineering in Tibet. She was committed to women's education, establishing Buddhist convents, and creating religious dances for women. Drönma was a leading figure in the Tibetan Bodongpa tradition which gradually waned under Gelugpa rule, but was restored in the modern era.

She died at the Manmogang Monastery in Tsari to the southeast of Dakpo, near the Indian border, in 1455.
