= Nyemo =

Nyemo may refer to:

- Nyêmo County, county in Tibet
- Nyêmo Town, town in central Tibet
