= Mangyül Gungthang =

Coordinates: 28°55′31.29″N 85°20′30.68″E

Mangyül Gungthang (Tibetan: མང་ཡུལ་གུང་ཐང, Wylie: mang yul gung thang), simplified Chinese: 芒域贡堂; traditional Chinese: 芒域貢堂; pinyin: mángyù gòngtáng) alternatively known as Ngari Me (Lower Ngari) is the name of a Tibetan kingdom established under Sakya overlordship in Southwest Tibet around 1265. Historically it lies in an area that was an important transit point between the north and south Himalayas, and it was through this route that Padmasambhava and Śāntarakṣita arrived in Tibet. It was founded by a descendant of the Tibetan royal house, Bumdegon (1253–1280) It was one of the thirteen myriarchies (khri skor bcu gsum) ruled by a Sakya lama viceroy appointed by the Yuan court of China.

Chökyi Drönma, the eldest daughter of Thri Lhawang Gyaltsen (1404–1464) and the first Samding Dorje Phagmo – the third highest-ranking person in the Tibetan hierarchy – hailed from the district.

The kings of Gungthang were subject to a variety of Central Asian overlords down to 1620, when their kingdom was destroyed by the King of Tsang.

The capital of the kingdom was the fortified citadel of Dzongka "White Fortress". After the discovery of gold in Western Tibet, it became an important link in the network of trans-Himalayan trade.
