= Vajravārāhī =

Tibetan Buddhist deity

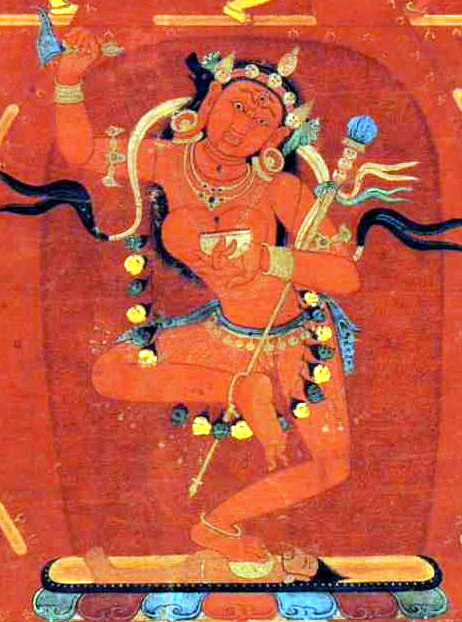
Buddha Vajravārāhī

In Tibetan Buddhism, Vajravārāhī ("The Indestructible Sow", Tibetan: རྡོ་རྗེ་ཕག་མོ་, Wylie: rdo rje phag mo Dorje Pakmo) is considered a female buddha and "the root of all emanations of dakinis". As such, Vajravarahi manifests in the colors of white, yellow, red, green, blue, and black. She is a popular deity in Tibetan Buddhism, and in the Nyingma school she is the consort of Hayagriva, the wrathful form of Avalokiteshvara. She is also associated with the Cakrasaṃvara Tantra, where she is paired in yab-yum with the Heruka Cakrasaṃvara.

The Vajravarahi tulku lineage is the Samding Dorje Phagmo, who are associated with the Bodongpa, a little-known school of Tibetan Buddhism.

There are practices of Vajravārāhī in all schools of Tibetan Buddhism, and in the Kagyu school Vajravarahi is one of its main yidam practices.

Vajravarahi is depicted as a naked, often red-skinned maiden in a dancing posture, with a kapala (skull cup) in her left hand and a khatvanga on her left shoulder, while her right hand holds a curved knife.

== Iconography ==
Vajravārāhī is one of the most popular female Tantric deities in all traditions of Tibetan Buddhism. Although there are several forms, she is often depicted as either red, dark blue or black in color. The basic iconography is that she is naked, has one face, usually two hands, and holds a curved knife in her right hand, and a skull cup (kapala) of symbolic blood in her left hand. Her khatvanga represents her inseparable consort and rests on her left shoulder. Her two legs are in the dancing posture, on a symbolic human corpse. Vajravarahi's distinguishing iconographic attribute is her dancing posture with one leg bent upward, and the sow head (varahi), representing victory over ignorance, depicted either behind her ear or above her head.

Often, Vajravarahi is conflated iconographically with Vajrayogini. She is sometimes called the 'two-faced' Vajrayogini (shal nyi ma) because of the sow's head.

The major iconographic differences are reflected in Vajravarahi's dancing posture and her sow's head symbol, while Vajrayogini is in a standing posture, has a damaru (drum) in her right hand, and a curved knife at her left hip. She is always red in color.

Judith Simmer-Brown writes that "Vajravārāhī's iconography is very similar to that of Vajrayoginī, but she often has more prominent fangs and a more wrathful expression, and she prominently displays a sow's head above her right ear." She can be also seen as a wrathful form of Vajrayogini.

== Outline ==
In Buddhist tantric texts, Vajravarahi and Cakrasamvara defeat the embodiments of ego, Bhairava and Kali, in a battle that sees each side pitting twenty-four emanations of themselves against the other in twenty-four sacred sites.

== Incarnation lineages ==
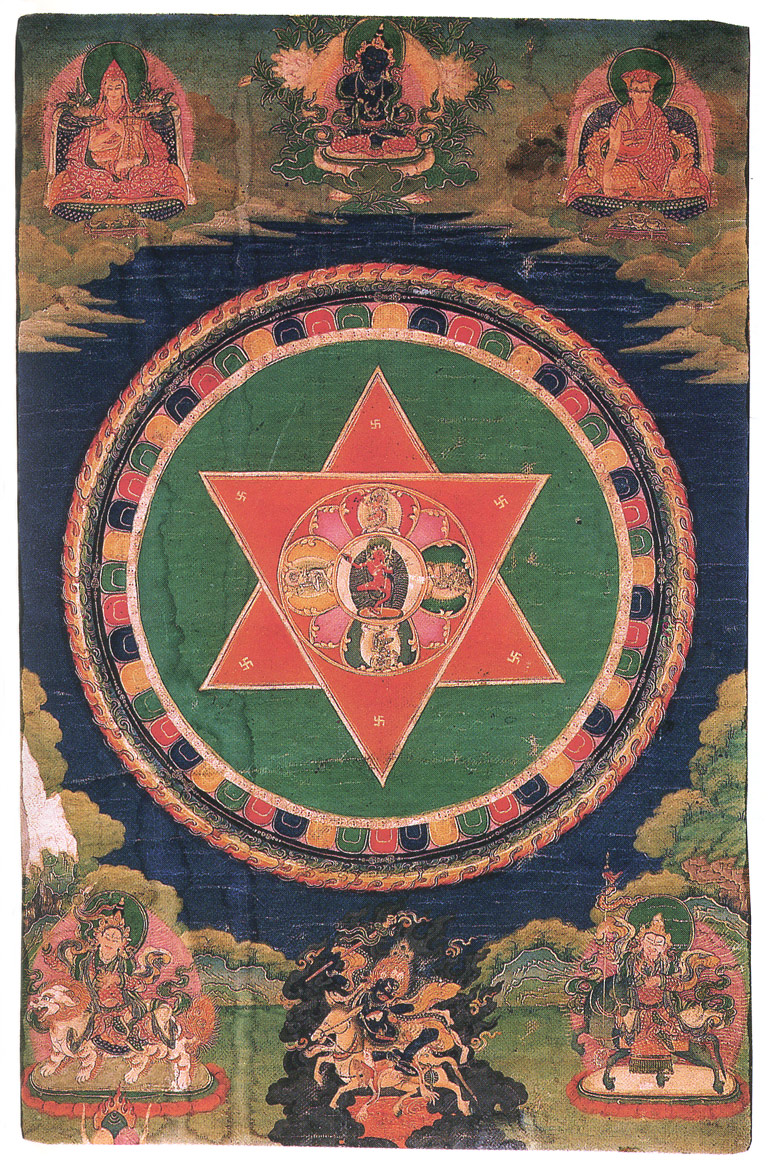
Vajravarahi mandala

=== Samding Dorje Phagmo ===
One tulku lineage associated with Vajravarahi is that of Samding Dorje Phagmo, who first manifested at Samding Monastery in 1717 in order to tame Yamdrok Lake, a sacred lake as well as a dangerous flashpoint for massive flooding events in Tibet.

However, her effects were said to be more practical: as abbess of Samding, it is said that she stopped the invasion of the Dzungars, who were described as terrified of her great siddhi powers. When faced with her anger—which it is said she expressed by turning the 80 śrāmaṇerīs under her care into furious wild sows—they left the goods and valuables they had plundered as offerings at her monastery and fled the region.

In 1716, when the Jungar invaders of Tibet came to Nangartse, their chief sent word to Samding to the Dorjo Phagmo to appear before him, that he might see if she really had, as reported, a pig's head. A mild answer was returned to him; but, incensed at her refusing to obey his summons, he tore down the walls of the monastery of Samding, and broke into the sanctuary. He found it deserted, not a human being in it, only eighty pigs and as many sows grunting in the congregation hall under the lead of a big sow, and he dared not sack a place belonging to pigs. When the Jungars had given up all idea of sacking Samding, suddenly the pigs disappeared to become venerable-looking lamas and nuns, with the saintly Dorje Phagmo at their head. Filled with astonishment and veneration for the sacred character of the lady abbess, the chief made immense presents to her lamasery.

=== Other incarnation lineages ===
There also is a Dorje Phagmo tulku in Bhutan recognized by the Sakya lama Rikey Jatrel, considered an incarnation of Thang Tong Gyalpo, who was a close associate of Chökyi Drönma despite his political tensions with the Bodongpa lineage heads of the time. She is currently a member of the monastic community of Thangtong Dewachen Dupthop Nunnery at Zilingkha in Thimphu, which follows the Nyingma and the Shangpa Kagyu traditions.
