= Paggor Township =

Township in Tibet, China

Coordinates: 29°34′N 90°0′E

Paggor is a township in Nyêmo County of the Lhasa prefecture-level city in the Tibet Autonomous Region of China. It lies roughly 75 miles west of Lhasa north of the Brahmaputra river at an altitude of 4,465 metres (14,652 feet).

It lies approximately 18.7 miles north of Qamqenxoi.

== See also ==
- List of towns and villages in Tibet
