= Margyang Township =

Township in Tibet, China

Coordinates: 29°47′N 89°55′E

Margyang is a small town and township in Nyêmo County of the Lhasa prefecture-level city in the Tibet Autonomous Region of China.

== See also ==
- List of towns and villages in Tibet
