= Tarchong =

Town in Nyêmo, Lhasa, Tibet, China

Coordinates: 29°25′N 90°15′E

Tarchong (Chinese: 塔荣镇, Standard Tibetan: དར་གྲོང་) is a small and the seat of Nyêmo County, of the Lhasa prefecture-level city in the Tibet Autonomous Region of China.

== See also ==
- List of towns and villages in Tibet
