= Puma Yumco =

Lake of China

- ཕུ་མ་གཡུ་མཚོ · 普莫雍错
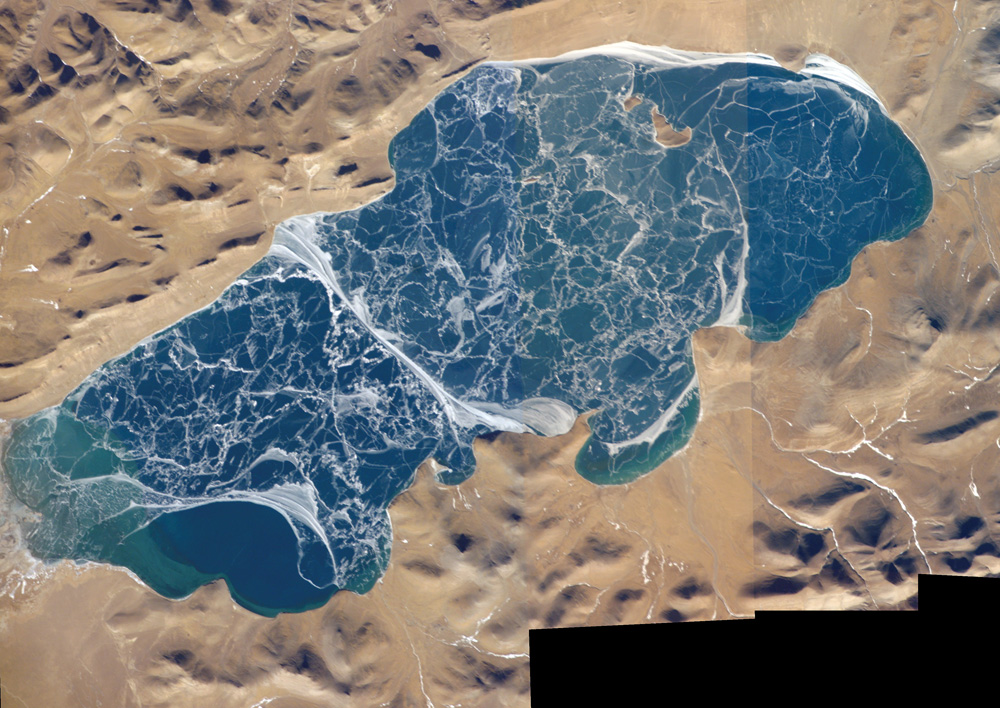
- Puma Yumco in winter. The north-south white line is a possible ice ridge, formed by east-west winds subsequently highlighted by snow.

- Location in the Tibet A.R.
- Location: Nagarzê County, Tibet
- Coordinates: 28°34′N 90°25′E
- Type: ultraoligotrophic
- Basin countries: China
- Max. length: 32 km (20 mi)
- Max. width: 14 km (8.7 mi)
- Surface area: 280 km^{2} (110 sq mi)
- Surface elevation: 5,030 m (16,500 ft)

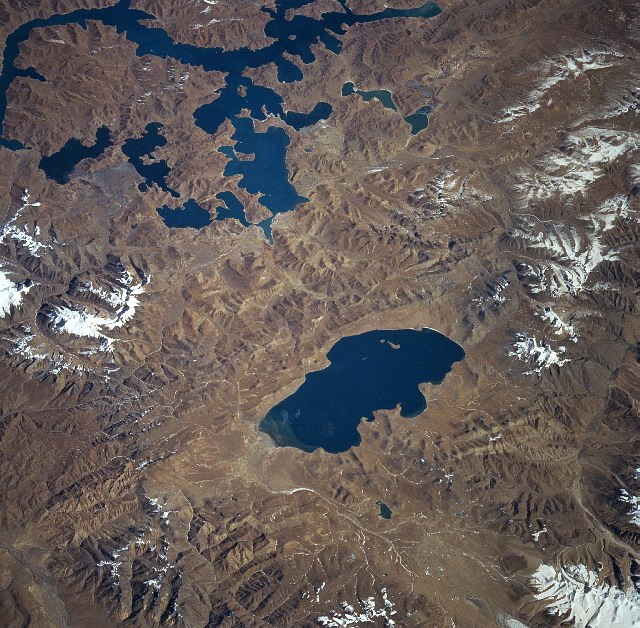
Puma Yumco (centre) and Lake Yamzho Yumco from space, November 1997

Puma Yumco (Tibetan: ཕུ་མ་གཡུ་མཚོ, Wylie: phu ma g.yu mtsho; simplified Chinese: 普莫雍错; traditional Chinese: 普莫雍錯; pinyin: Pǔmò Yōngcuò) is a lake located at 5,030 m (16,500 ft) above mean sea level on the southern Tibetan Plateau, and is situated within Nagarzê County of the Tibet Autonomous Region. It is 32 km (20 mi) long, 14 km (8.7 mi) wide, and covers an area of 280 km^{2} (110 sq mi). Streams of water from the snow-capped surrounding mountains feed the lake, and its water surplus flows into Yamdrok Lake via an outlet located at its southeastern end. Some sediment can be seen entering the lake at its western end.

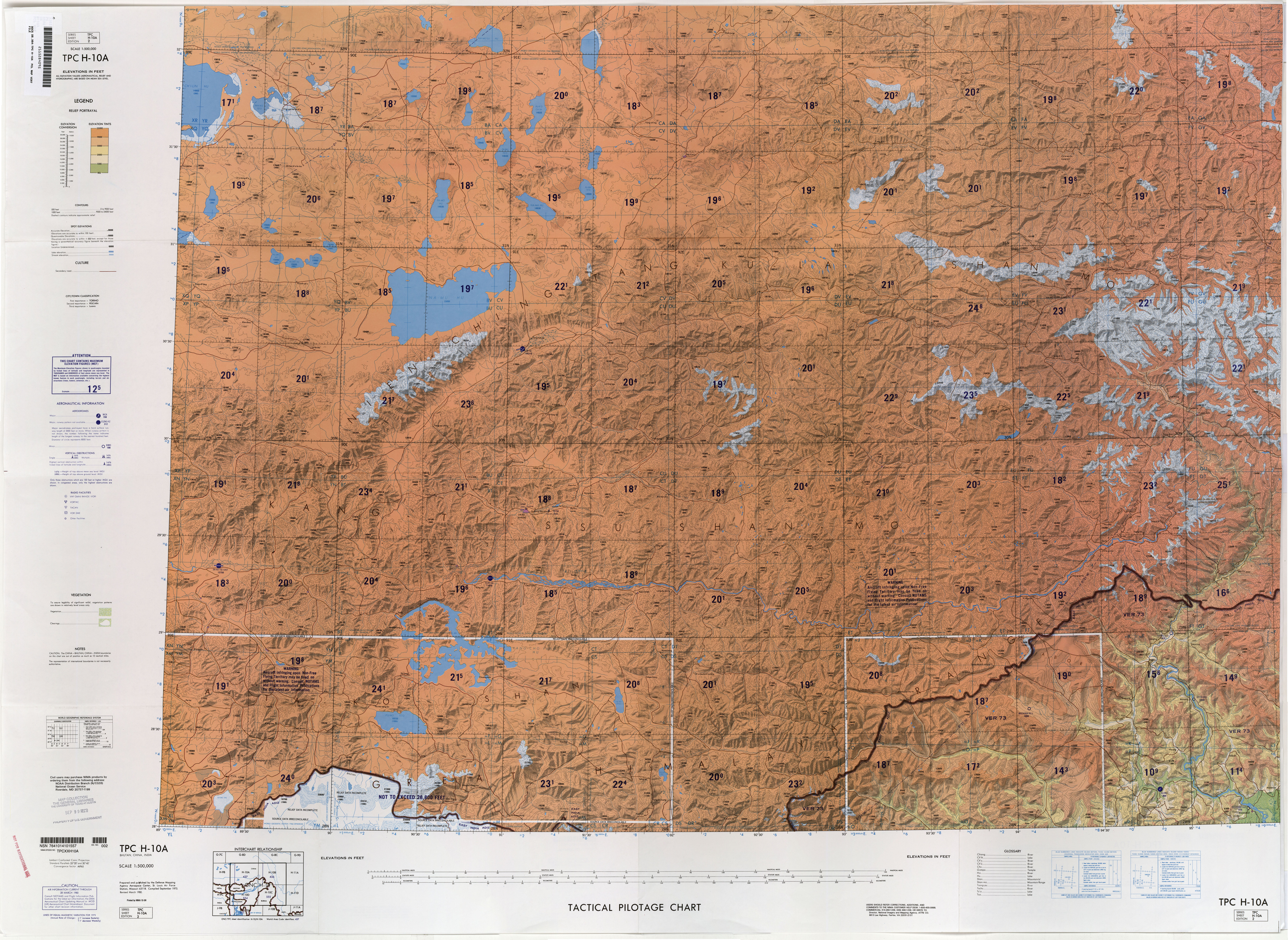
Map including Puma Yumco

Puma Yum literally means The Blue Jewel which is floating in the sky. The lake freezes in winter and is crossed by shepherds with their sheep. The lake is considered ultraoligotrophic, meaning that nutrient concentrations in both the water column and lake sediments are extremely low. Water in such lakes tends to be blue to blue-green and to have high clarity due to low levels of photosynthesizing organisms such as phytoplankton.

During the winter, the lake develops intricate ice block patterns on the surface, ranging from less than ten to hundreds of metres in diameter. The ice pattern is caused by repeated cycles of freezing, fracturing, and refreezing of the ice due to variations in temperature and wind-induced ice motion.

== Climate ==
The area around Puma Yumco has a dry alpine climate (Köppen ETH) with long, freezing, very dry winters and short, cool, somewhat humid summers. There is a great variety between day and night. Summer temperatures often rise to 15 °C (59 °F), but even then they often fall below freezing at night time. Likewise, while temperatures do quite normally reach above freezing even in January, at night time they commonly reach −20 °C (−4 °F). Thanks to the low temperatures, the lake is frozen over most of the year.

A majority of the 243 millimetres (9.6 in) of precipitation that falls during a year occurs during July and August, and as rain. There is almost no precipitation in the winter months, so that snow is uncommon.

Climate data for Puma Yumco
Month	Jan	Feb	Mar	Apr	May	Jun	Jul	Aug	Sep	Oct	Nov	Dec	Year
Mean daily maximum °C (°F)	−0.5 (31.1)	0.5 (32.9)	2.5 (36.5)	6.1 (43.0)	9.8 (49.6)	13.1 (55.6)	12.9 (55.2)	12.2 (54.0)	10.9 (51.6)	7.0 (44.6)	3.2 (37.8)	1.1 (34.0)	6.6 (43.8)
Daily mean °C (°F)	−10.0 (14.0)	−8.2 (17.2)	−5.2 (22.6)	−1.0 (30.2)	3.1 (37.6)	7.1 (44.8)	7.7 (45.9)	7.1 (44.8)	5.3 (41.5)	−0.2 (31.6)	−5.5 (22.1)	−8.5 (16.7)	−0.7 (30.8)
Mean daily minimum °C (°F)	−19.5 (−3.1)	−16.8 (1.8)	−12.8 (9.0)	−8.1 (17.4)	−3.5 (25.7)	1.2 (34.2)	2.6 (36.7)	2.0 (35.6)	−0.2 (31.6)	−7.3 (18.9)	−14.2 (6.4)	−18.1 (−0.6)	−7.9 (17.8)
Average precipitation mm (inches)	0 (0)	1 (0.0)	2 (0.1)	5 (0.2)	10 (0.4)	31 (1.2)	75 (3.0)	76 (3.0)	33 (1.3)	9 (0.4)	1 (0.0)	0 (0)	243 (9.6)
Source: "Pumajiangtang Climate". Climate-Data.org.
