= Manmogang Monastery =

Buddhist monastery in Tibet

Manmogang Monastery was a Buddhist monastery in Tsari to the southeast of Dakpo in the Shigatse Prefecture of Tibet. It was located near the border with India. It is documented as being the place where Dorje Pakmo died in 1455.
