= Abongshan Formation =

Geological formation in Tibet, China

- Stratigraphic range: Late Cretaceous
- Type: Geological Formation

Location
- Region: Northern Tibet
- Country: China

The Abongshan Formation is dated to the Late Cretaceous period and consists of red sandstone. A majority of the formation is located in the northern part of the Tibetan Autonomous Region in China.
