= Nyêmo County =

Nyêmo 尼木县 • སྙེ་མོ་རྫོང་། Nimu
- County
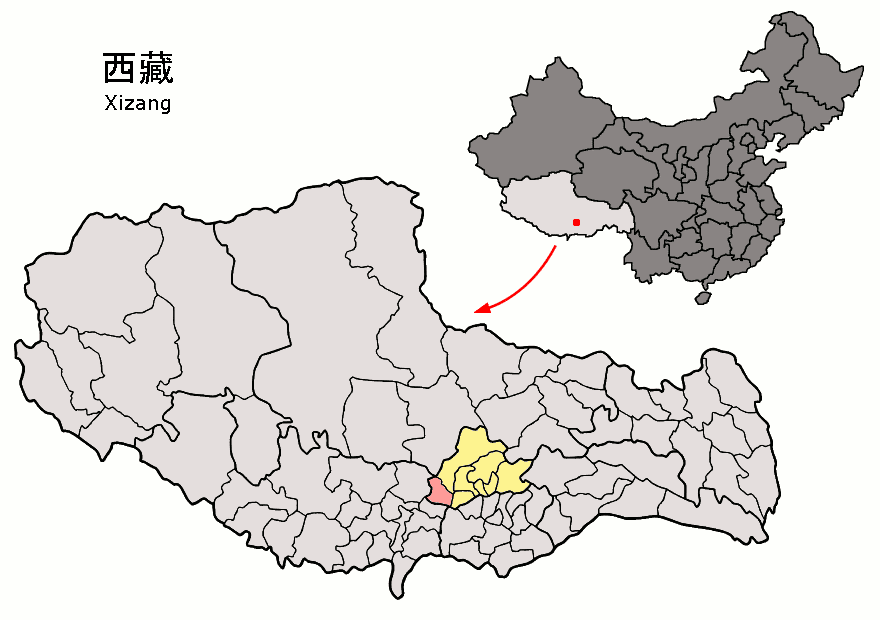
- Location of Nyêmo County within Tibet Autonomous Region

- Location in Tibet Nyêmo (China)
- Coordinates (Nyêmo government): 29°25′55″N 90°09′50″E
- Country: China
- Region: Tibet
- Prefecture-level city: Lhasa
- County seat: Tarchong

Area
  - Total: 3,275 km^{2} (1,264 sq mi)

Population (2020)
  - Total: 29,989
  - Density: 9.157/km^{2} (23.72/sq mi)
- Time zone: UTC+8 (China Standard)
- Website: www.nmx.gov.cn

Nyêmo County

Chinese name
- Simplified Chinese: 尼木县
- Traditional Chinese: 尼木縣
Transcriptions
Standard Mandarin
- Hanyu Pinyin: Nímù Xiàn

Tibetan name
- Tibetan: སྙེ་མོ་རྫོང་།
Transcriptions
- Wylie: snye mo rdzong
- Tibetan Pinyin: Nyêmo Zong

Nyêmo is a county in the Lhasa west of the main center of Chengguan, Tibet. It lies on the north bank of the Yarlung Tsangpo River, the northern part of the Brahmaputra. The county has an area of 3,276 square kilometres (1,265 sq mi), and as of 2011 had a population of 30,844 people, mostly engaged in agriculture or herding.

== Location ==
"Nyemo" is the Tibetan word for "wheat". It is located in the middle section of the Brahmaputra, 140 kilometres (87 mi) from Lhasa. It is mainly agricultural and pastoral, with an area of 3,276 square kilometres (1,265 sq mi) and an average elevation of 4,000 metres (13,000 ft). The county seat is 3,809 metres (12,497 ft) above sea level. The Nimu Maqu River flows through the county from north to south. The Yarlung Tsangpo River forms its southern boundary. The highest point is a peak at 7,048.8 metres (23,126 ft) above sea level, and the lowest point is where the Maqu River empties into the Brahmaputra at an elevation of 3,701 metres (12,142 ft).

The county has a temperate semi-arid plateau monsoon climate, with about 100 frost-free days. Annual rainfall is 324.2 millimetres (12.76 in). Nyêmo County mineral resources are copper, molybdenum and peat. Wildlife includes leopards, bears, lynx, river deer, black-necked cranes, and pheasant. Wild plants include Fritillaria, Cordyceps, berberine and lotus.

== History ==
Nyêmo was the birthplace of the great translator Vairocana, and the place where the teacher Padmasambhava subjugated local spirits during his journey from Nepal to Lhasa. Old pre-Buddhist cults have survived into the modern era along with monasteries of the different Buddhist traditions. The ala priestly tradition is a local hybrid of traditional religions and Buddhism that is distinctive of Nyemo. Female mediums, possessed by spirits, performed healing ceremonies until the time of the Cultural Revolution.

In late 1968 a revolt in the rural areas of Tibet began in Nyêmo, caused by shortages of food and the chaos of the Cultural Revolution. The revolt later spread to twenty more counties in the Tibet Autonomous Region. In the 1969 "Nyemo incident" the followers of Nyêmo nun Trinley Chödrön combined with the forces of the Maoist Gyenlo party organization. Their “Army of the Gods” attacked government and army compounds and rival cadres throughout the region over the course of several weeks in June 1969. Tinley Chodron, who was said to be an emanation of the holy bird Labja Gongmo from the Epic of King Gesar, was executed in Lhasa later that year.

== Administrative divisions ==
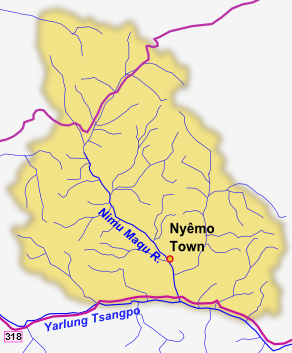
Rivers of the county

Nyêmo County includes 2 towns and 6 townships:

Name	Tibetan	Tibetan Pinyin	Chinese	Pinyin
Towns
Tarchong Town	དར་གྲོང་ཆོས་འཁོར།	Tarchong Chongdai	塔荣镇	Tǎróng Zhèn
Toinba Town	ཐོན་པ་ཆོས་འཁོར།	Toinba Chongdai	吞巴镇	Tūnbā Zhèn
Townships
Margyang Township	མར་རྐྱང་ཤང་།	Margyang Xang	麻江乡	Májiāng Xiāng
Pusum Township	ཕུ་གསུམ་ཤང་།	Pusum Xang	普松乡	Pǔsōng Xiāng
Karru Township	མཁར་རུ་ཤང་།	Karru Xang	卡如乡	Kǎrú Xiāng
Nyêmo Township	སྙེ་མོ་ཤང་།	Nyêmo Xang	尼木乡	Nímù Xiāng
Xumai Township	གཞུ་སྨད་ཤང་།	Xumai Xang	续迈乡	Xùmài Xiāng
Paggor Township	བྲག་སྐོར་ཤང་།	Chagkor Xang	帕古乡	Pàgǔ Xiāng

== Climate ==
Climate data for Nyêmo, elevation 3,809 m (12,497 ft), (1991–2020 normals)
Month	Jan	Feb	Mar	Apr	May	Jun	Jul	Aug	Sep	Oct	Nov	Dec	Year
Mean daily maximum °C (°F)	7.8 (46.0)	9.5 (49.1)	12.6 (54.7)	16.0 (60.8)	19.9 (67.8)	23.5 (74.3)	22.8 (73.0)	21.9 (71.4)	21.0 (69.8)	17.4 (63.3)	12.7 (54.9)	9.5 (49.1)	16.2 (61.2)
Daily mean °C (°F)	−2.4 (27.7)	0.5 (32.9)	4.2 (39.6)	7.8 (46.0)	11.8 (53.2)	15.3 (59.5)	15.1 (59.2)	14.3 (57.7)	12.9 (55.2)	8.0 (46.4)	1.9 (35.4)	−1.9 (28.6)	7.3 (45.1)
Mean daily minimum °C (°F)	−11.9 (10.6)	−9.0 (15.8)	−4.6 (23.7)	0.1 (32.2)	4.5 (40.1)	8.5 (47.3)	9.7 (49.5)	9.0 (48.2)	6.8 (44.2)	0.0 (32.0)	−6.9 (19.6)	−11.3 (11.7)	−0.4 (31.2)
Average precipitation mm (inches)	0.3 (0.01)	0.8 (0.03)	2.5 (0.10)	6.6 (0.26)	22.6 (0.89)	55.6 (2.19)	104.3 (4.11)	103.2 (4.06)	50.6 (1.99)	6.5 (0.26)	0.6 (0.02)	0.4 (0.02)	354 (13.94)
Average precipitation days (≥ 0.1 mm)	0.6	0.8	1.9	4.2	7.7	12.4	19.7	19.5	11.6	2.2	0.4	0.2	81.2
Average snowy days	1.1	2.0	4.2	6.7	2.2	0.2	0	0	0	1.2	1.0	0.9	19.5
Average relative humidity (%)	25	25	28	36	42	50	61	64	59	43	32	26	41
Mean monthly sunshine hours	248.7	230.1	259.8	267.4	293.8	270.5	229.2	228.8	245.6	275.1	262.6	259.4	3,071
Percentage possible sunshine	76	72	69	69	69	65	54	57	67	79	83	82	70
Source: China Meteorological Administration

== Economy ==
As of 2011 the total population was 30,844 people, of whom 28,474 were engaged in agriculture or herding. In 2010 the per-capita net income of farmers and herdsmen was 4,854 yuan, while the disposable income of urban residents reached 14,381 yuan. Total livestock was 167,800 excluding horses. By 2012 the per capita income of farmers and herdsmen had reached 6,881 yuan. In 2000, the county had 189 businesses with 3,319 production employees. Copper is mined in the county.

In the 7th century Nyêmo was producing printing materials, clay-based incense and wooden-sole shoes. Nyêmo's long tradition of making paper and printing texts using woodblocks dates back to this period. Nyêmo County has China's first museum of Tibetan text. Traditional paper continues to be manufactured in a village in Nyemo Town. Other artisan products include incense and wood engraving for printing on paper and on prayer flags. The processes of making Tibetan paper, incense and wood carvings are known as the "three unique skills of Nyemo."

== Infrastructure ==
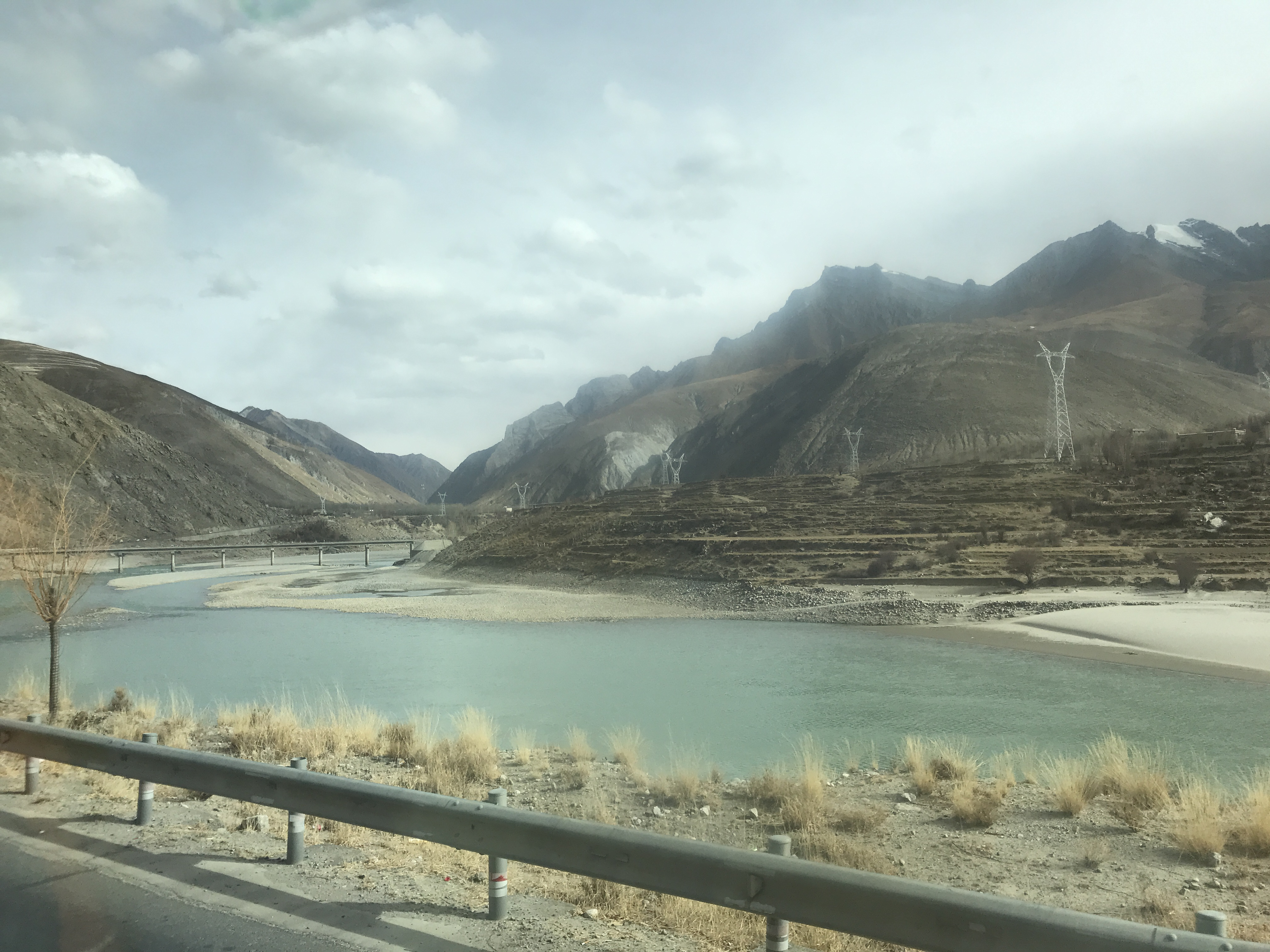
Yarlung Tsangpo River in Nyêmo.

The county has 24 primary and secondary schools, including one junior high school, with a total staff of 260 people. There is a county hospital with 42 medical staff, eight rural health centers and 26 village clinics with 71 medical personnel. There is a county television station. A small hydropower power plant with a capacity of 250 kilowatts produces 257,000 kilowatt hours annually. The Friendship Highway (part of China National Highway 318) passes through Nyêmo County on the section between Lhasa and Shigatse.

There are 22 temples, of which fourteen are male monasteries and eight are nunneries. As of 2011 there were 118 monks and 99 nuns. The Nyêmo Chekar monastery is known for its 16th century murals depicting reincarnations of the Samding Dorje Phagmo. At Jieji Monastery the lamas make elaborate mandalas using pieces of woodcarving and hand-made embroidery. The art form was brought from India to Tibet in the 11th century.

== Sources ==
- Diemberger, Hildegrard (2005). "Female Oracles in Modern Tibet". Women in Tibet. Columbia University Press. ISBN 978-0-231-13098-1.
- Diemberger, Hildegard (2014-03-04). When a Woman Becomes a Religious Dynasty: The Samding Dorje Phagmo of Tibet. Columbia University Press. ISBN 978-0-231-14321-9.
- "Experts and Scholars Visited Tibet Following the 4th Beijing Seminar on Tibetan Studies". China Tibetology Network. 2008-11-13. Archived from the original on 2015-02-21.
- "Inside Nimu". China Tibet Online.
- "Mandala: art treasure of Tibetan Buddhism". China Tibet Information Center. 2009-06-22. Archived from the original on 2015-02-21.
- "Nimu Traditions". Tibet Daily. 2009-06-15. Archived from the original on 2015-02-20.
- "Nyêmo County 2012 Summary of Economic and Social Development". Xinhua. 2013-02-20. Archived from the original on 2015-02-20.
- "Nyêmo County". haotui.com. Archived from the original on February 20, 2015.
- "Nyêmo County Overview". Municipal People's Government of Lhasa. 2011-03-15. Archived from the original on 2015-02-14.
- Schwartz, Ronald (January 2011). "Book Review: Melvyn C. Goldstein, Ben Jiao and Tanzen Lhundrup, On the Cultural Revolution in Tibet: The Nyemo Incident of 1969". China Perspectives.
- Shakabpa, Tsepon Wangchuk Deden (2009). One Hundred Thousand Moons: An Advanced Political History of Tibet. BRILL. ISBN 90-04-17732-9.
- Sihlé, Nicolas (2009). "The Ala and Ngakpa priestly traditions of Nyemo (Central Tibet): hybridity and hierarchy". Buddhism Beyond the Monastery: Tantric Practices and Their Performers in Tibet and the Himalayas. BRILL. ISBN 90-04-17600-4.
- Smith, Warren W. (2009). China's Tibet?: Autonomy Or Assimilation. Rowman & Littlefield. ISBN 978-0-7425-3990-7.
