= Nyêmo Township =

Nyêmo
- Township

Tibetan transcription(s)
  - Tibetan: སྙེ་མོ
  - Wylie transliteration: snye mo

Chinese transcription(s)
  - Traditional: 尼木鄉
  - Simplified: 尼木乡
- Location within Tibet
- Coordinates: 29°26′9″N 90°9′32″E
- Country: China
- Province: Tibet Autonomous Region
- Prefecture: Lhasa
- County: Nyêmo
- Time zone: UTC+8 (CST)

Nyêmo is a township of Nyêmo County in the Lhasa Prefecture of the Tibet Autonomous Region of China. It is located 94 kilometres south-west of Lhasa.

== See also ==
- List of towns and villages in Tibet
