= Yamdrok Lake =

Lake in Tibet

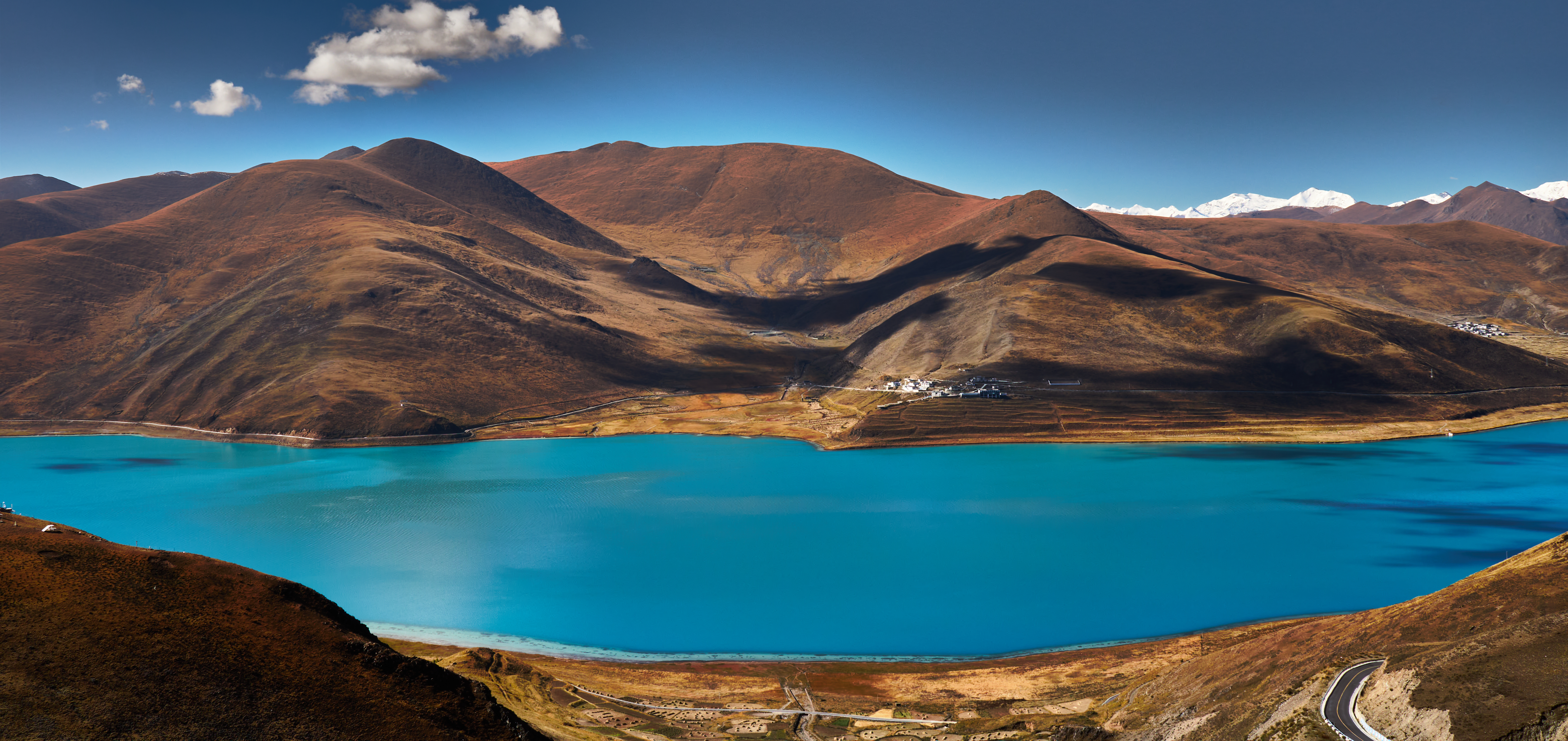
- Yamdrok Lake from Langbuqi Viewing Platform

- Location within Tibet
- Basin countries: China
- Max. length: 72 km (45 mi)
- Surface area: 638 km^{2} (246 sq mi)
- Average depth: 30 m (98 ft)
- Max. depth: 60 m (200 ft)
- Surface elevation: 4,441 m (14,570 ft)

Yamdrok Lake

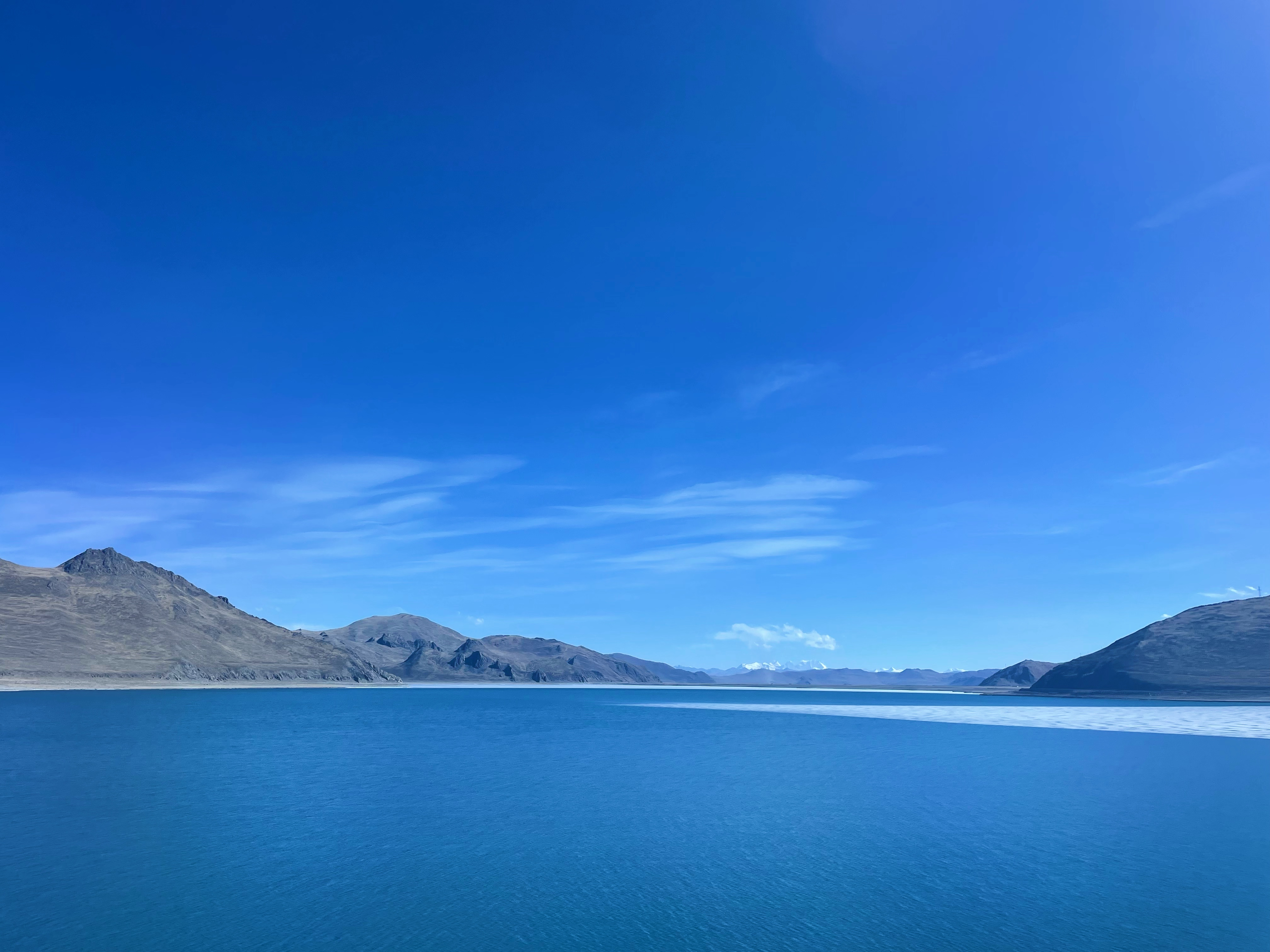
Yamdrok Lake

Yamdrok Lake (also known as Yamdrok Yumtso or Yamzho Yumco; Tibetan: ཡར་འབྲོག་གཡུ་མཚོ་, Wylie: yar 'brog g.yu mtsho, ZWPY: Yamzhog Yumco; Chinese: 羊卓雍錯; pinyin: Yángzhuó Yōngcuò, Yángzhuō Yōngcuò) is a freshwater lake in Tibet. It is one of the three largest lakes in Tibet. It is over 72 km (45 mi) long. The lake is surrounded by many snow-capped mountains and is fed by numerous small streams. The lake has an outlet stream, a tributary of Yarlung Tsangpo, at its far western end and means turquoise in English due to its color.

Around 90 km (56 mi) to the west of the lake lies the Tibetan town of Gyantse and Lhasa is 100 km (62 mi) to the northeast. According to local mythology, Yamdok Yumtso lake is the transformation of a goddess.

The Yamdrok Hydropower Station was completed and dedicated in 1996 near the small village of Baidi at the lake's western end. This power station is the largest in Tibet.

== Physical data ==
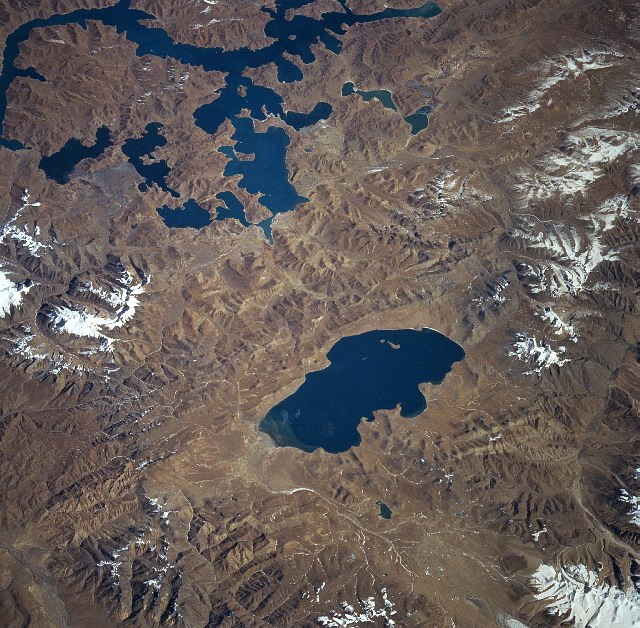
Yamdrok Lake (at the top) and Lake Puma Yumco from space, November 1997

The lake (638 km^{2} (246 sq mi) in area, 30 metres (98 ft) average depth and 60 metres (200 ft) at its deepest) is fan-shaped, spreading to the south but narrowing up to the north. The mountainous lakeshore is highly crenellated, with numerous bays and inlets. Lake Yamdrok freezes in winter.

== Climate ==
Yamdrok Lake has a cold steppe climate (BSk) with long, cold, very dry winters and short, cool, wet summers. It is also bordering on an alpine tundra climate (ET) and on a subarctic climate (Dwc). The differences between day and night are great.

Climate data for Yamdrok Lake
Month	Jan	Feb	Mar	Apr	May	Jun	Jul	Aug	Sep	Oct	Nov	Dec	Year
Mean daily maximum °C (°F)	1.9 (35.4)	3.4 (38.1)	5.8 (42.4)	9.5 (49.1)	13.1 (55.6)	16.6 (61.9)	16.1 (61.0)	15.2 (59.4)	13.9 (57.0)	10.2 (50.4)	6.1 (43.0)	3.3 (37.9)	9.6 (49.3)
Daily mean °C (°F)	−7.4 (18.7)	−5.2 (22.6)	−2.0 (28.4)	2.1 (35.8)	6.2 (43.2)	10.3 (50.5)	10.6 (51.1)	9.8 (49.6)	8.1 (46.6)	2.8 (37.0)	−2.6 (27.3)	−6.0 (21.2)	2.2 (36.0)
Mean daily minimum °C (°F)	−16.7 (1.9)	−13.8 (7.2)	−9.8 (14.4)	−5.2 (22.6)	−0.7 (30.7)	4.0 (39.2)	5.1 (41.2)	4.5 (40.1)	2.3 (36.1)	−4.6 (23.7)	−11.3 (11.7)	−15.3 (4.5)	−5.1 (22.8)
Average precipitation mm (inches)	0 (0)	0 (0)	2 (0.1)	4 (0.2)	12 (0.5)	39 (1.5)	82 (3.2)	83 (3.3)	37 (1.5)	7 (0.3)	1 (0.0)	0 (0)	267 (10.6)
Source: Climate-Data.org

== Cultural significance ==
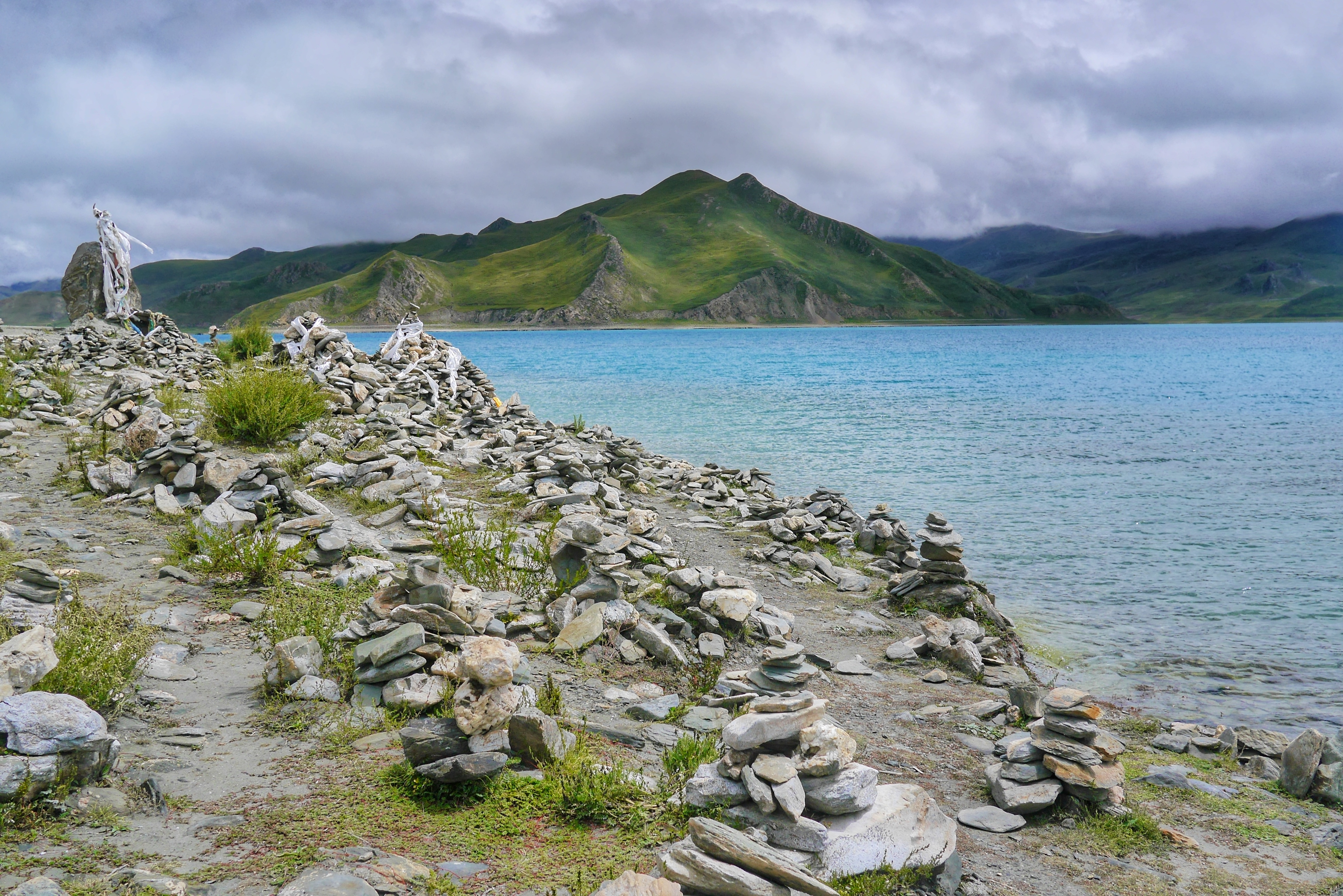
Yamdrok Lake in summer

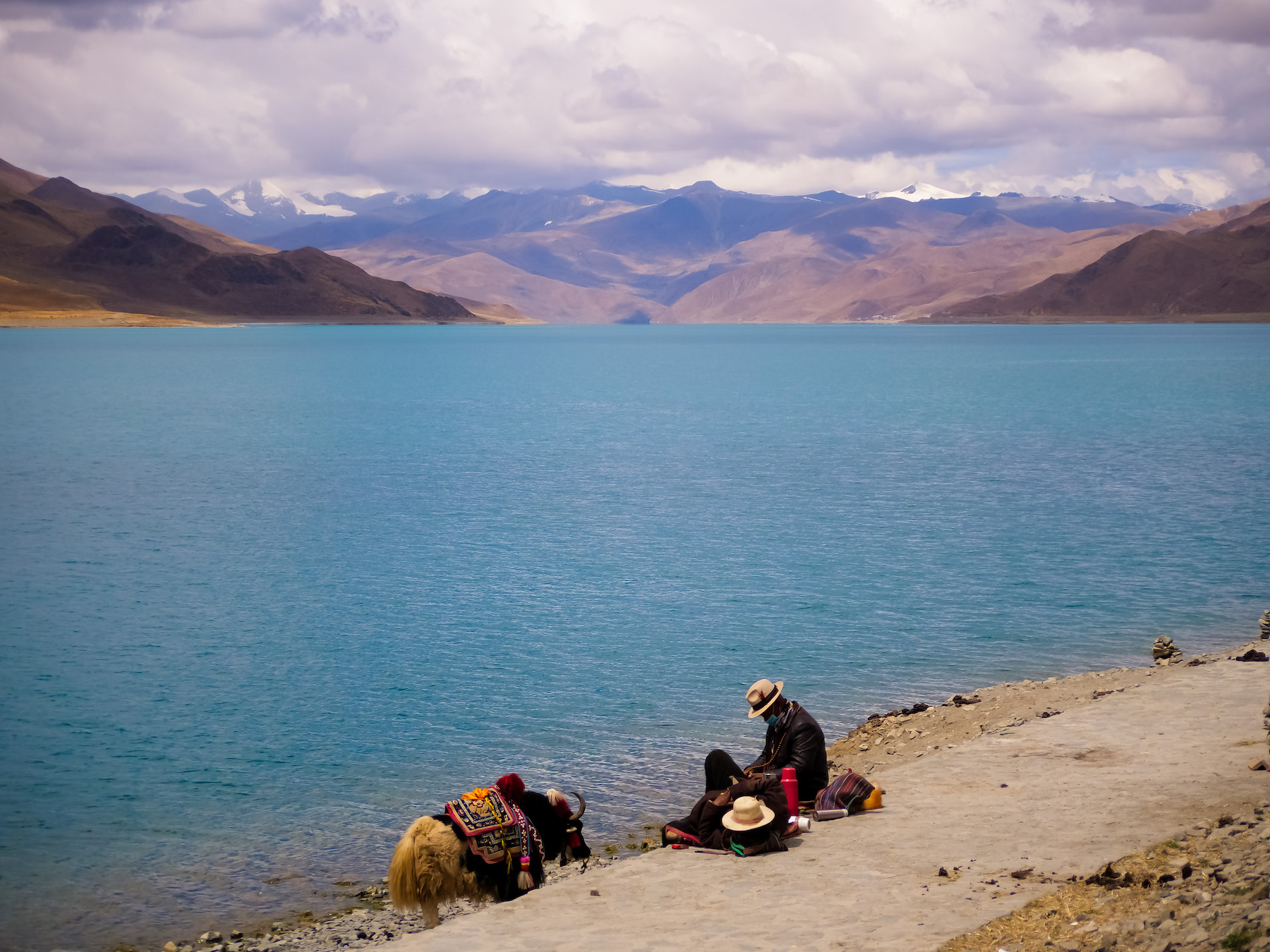
A view of the serene Yamdrok Lake with a yak in the foreground

Like mountains, lakes are considered sacred by Tibetan people, the principle being that they are the dwelling places of protective deities and therefore invested with special spiritual powers. Yamdrok Lake is one of four particularly holy lakes, thought to be divinatory; everyone from the Dalai Lama to local villagers makes pilgrimages there. It is considered sacred as one of the four "Great Wrathful Lakes" guarded by the goddess Dorje Gegkyi Tso. The others such lakes are Lhamo La-tso, Namtso and Manasarovar.

The lake, its islands, and the surrounding area are closely associated with Padmasambhava, the Second Buddha, who brought Buddhism to Tibet in eighth century AD. The lake is home to the famous Samding Monastery which is on a peninsula jutting into the lake. This monastery is the only Tibetan monastery to be headed by a female re-incarnation. Since it is not a nunnery, its abbess heads a community of about thirty monks and nuns. Samding Monastery is where Samding Dorje Phagmo, the most important female incarnate Lama in Tibet, stayed and presided, and stands to the south of Lake Yamdrok Yumtso.

Today, both pilgrims and tourists can be seen walking along the lake's perimeter. One of the lake's islands contains an old fort or castle called Pede Dzong.

== Economic significance ==
There are shoals of fish living in Yamdrok Lake, which are commercially exploited by the local population. From April to October, fish caught from this lake are sold at markets in Lhasa. Additionally, the lake's islands serve as rich pasture land to local herdsmen.
