= Bodongpa =

One of the smaller traditions of Tibetan Buddhism

The Bodongpa or Bodong tradition, is one of the smaller traditions of Tibetan Buddhism falling outside the classification of the four main schools.

== History ==
Bodong E Monastery (Wylie: bo dong e dgon pa), located in Yutok (Wylie: g.yu thog), in modern Tashigang (Wylie: bkra shis sgang shang), Lhatse County, was the main monastery of the Bodong tradition. It was first established in 1049 by the Kadam (Tibetan Buddhism) teacher Mudra Chenpo (Wylie: bka 'dams pa dge bshes mu tra chen po).

Bodong tradition itself goes back to Bodong Rinchen Tsemo, who received teachings from Drubthob Semo Chewa. Its most renowned figure, often regarded as its founder, was the Bodong Penchen Lénam Gyelchok (Wylie: las rnam rgyal phyogs, 1376-1451), whose seat was at this monastery. Bodong Penchen authored over one hundred and thirty-five volumes and is known as the most prolific writer in Tibetan history. His most famous work is the Compendium of Suchness (Wylie: de nyid 'dus pa) comprising one hundred and thirty-three volumes having about 500 folios (1000 pages) in each. The extensive version contains one hundred and ten volumes; the medium version, twenty volumes; the condensed version, two volumes; and the extremely condensed version, one volume and this encyclopaedic work is considered the foundation of the tradition.

Je Tsongkhapa studied at Bodong E Monastery with the Lotsawa Namkha Zangpo (Wylie: lo tsā ba nam mkha' bzang po), who taught him the Mirror of Poetry (Wylie: snyan ngag me long).

A well-known tulku of this tradition is Samding Dorje Phagmo, one of the few female incarnation lineages of Tibetan Buddhism.

== Religious establishments ==
Bodong E Gonpa was almost completely destroyed during the Cultural Revolution though some parts survived because it had been turned into a granary.

Nönga Abbey (Wylie: mngon dga' chos sde), in modern Tingri County, Shigatse, Tibet Autonomous Region.

Chöde Monastery (Wylie: chos sde dgon), Nyêmo County, Lhasa. Founded in 750, converted to the Bodong school in 1250.

Pelmo Chöding (Wylie: dpal mo chos lding) in Nyalam County, Shigatse, Tibet Autonomous Region.

=== Outside Tibet ===
In 1989 the Pelmo Choding monastery (Porong Gompa) in exile was established at Dharamsala, India. A Porong Pelmo Choding monastery has also been built in Kathmandu, Nepal. These monasteries were established by Tibetans from the Porong region of southwest Tibet to preserve the Bodong tradition.

== See also ==
- Samding Monastery

== Sources ==
- Diemberger, Hildegard (2007). When a Woman Becomes a Religious Dynasty: The Samding Dorje Phagmo of Tibet. Columbia University Press. ISBN 978-0-231-14320-2.
- Sudbury, Jill (2008). "Apparations of Red Horses:Narratives of Destruction in Bodongpa Monasteries in Central Tibet". In Pirie, Fernanda; Huber, Tony (eds.). Conflict and Social Order in Tibet and Inner Asia. Brill’s Tibetan Studies Library. Vol. 21. Leiden: Brill. pp. 193–216. ISBN 978-90-04-15817-7. ISSN 1568-6183.
