= Barkhang =

Barkhang may refer to:

- Derge Parkhang – a printing house in Derge, Sichuan in the historical Tibetan region of Kham
- Barkhang Monastery – a fictional Tibetan monastery in the videogame Tomb Raider II
