= Thang Tong Gyalpo =

Tibetan lama

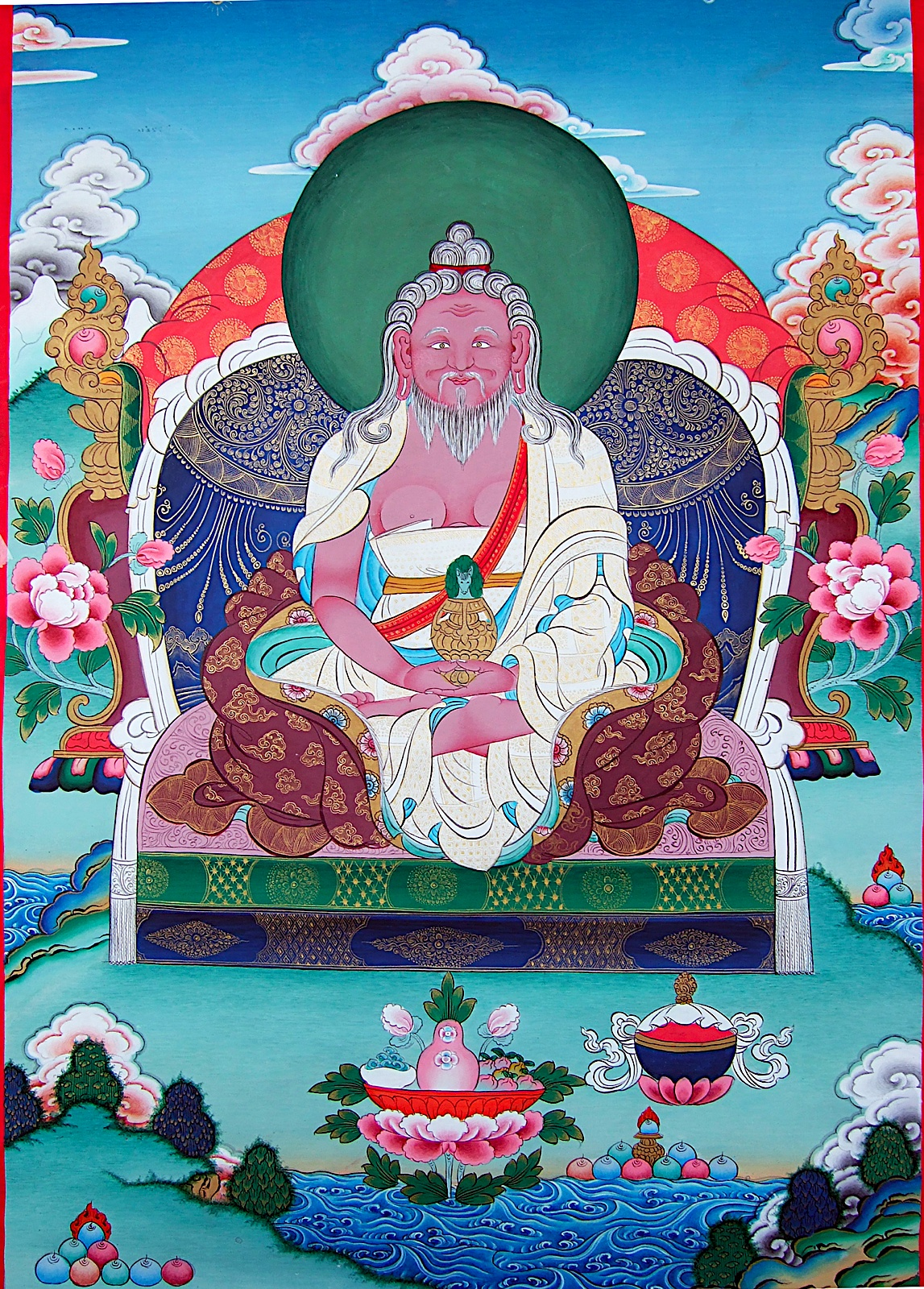
Thangtong Gyalpo

Thangtong Gyalpo (Tibetan: ཐང་སྟོང་རྒྱལ་པོ་, Wylie: thang stong rgyal po) (1385 CE–1464 CE or 1361 CE–1485 CE), is also known as Chakzampa, the "Iron Bridge Maker" (Wylie: lcags zam pa), Tsöndrü Zangpo "Excellent Persistence" (Wylie: brtson 'grus bzang po), and the King of the Empty Plain. He was also known by a variation of this name, Madman of the Empty Valley. He was a great Buddhist adept, a Chöd master, yogi, physician, blacksmith, architect, and a pioneering civil engineer. He is considered a mind emanation of Padmasambhava and a reincarnation of Dolpopa Sherab Gyaltsen. He founded the Iron Chain lineage of the Shangpa Kagyu school of Tibetan Buddhism, and he recognized the first Samding Dorje Phagmo, Chökyi Drönma (1422–1455), the female incarnation lineage of Vajravārāhī.

Thangtong Gyalpo is said to have built 58 iron chain suspension bridges around Tibet and Bhutan, several of which are still in use today. He also designed and built several large stupas of unusual design including the great Kumbum at Chung Riwoche, Tibet; established Gonchen Monastery in Derge; and is considered to be the father of a style of Tibetan opera called Lhamo. Associated with the Shangpa Kagyu, Nyingma and Sakya traditions of Tibetan Buddhism, and with the tradition of "mad yogis" known as nyönpa, Thang Tong Gyalpo is also known as a sorcerer character in the popular Tibetan story of Gesar. In addition, he is believed to be the most widely traveled person in Tibetan history.

== Biography ==
Thangtong Gyalpo was born at Ölpa Lhartse in upper Tsang (modern Ngamring County) in 1385 CE (wood ox year, sixth cycle).

Thangtong Gyalpo is best known for his founding of lhamo or Tibetan opera as well as the numerous iron suspension bridges he built to ease travel and pilgrimage though the Himalayas. He established a song and dance troupe of seven sisters to raise the money needed to build these bridges.

Thangtong Gyalpo also founded Gonchen Monastery, a large Sakya vihara and printing centre in the town of Derge, Kham (modern Sichuan, China).

Thangtong Gyalpo opened the route through the land of the Kongpo aborigines (the Lhoba people), where he obtained iron for his bridges and rights of passage for Tibetan pilgrims to visit the holy places in Tsari to the southeast of Dakpo near the Indian border.

He is also considered to be the patron saint of theatre and became known as "the madman of the empty land" (Wylie: lang ston smyon pa). Plays traditionally have an altar erected in the middle of the stage surrounded by trees, where the "god of drama", Thangtong Gyalpo, is worshiped as an elderly man with a white beard.

He is said to have made 108 iron-chain suspension bridges (though another account says 58 suspension bridges and 118 ferry-crossings), the most celebrated being the one over the Yarlung Tsanpo near modern Chüshül. He is often shown in murals with long white hair and holding some chain links from his bridges.

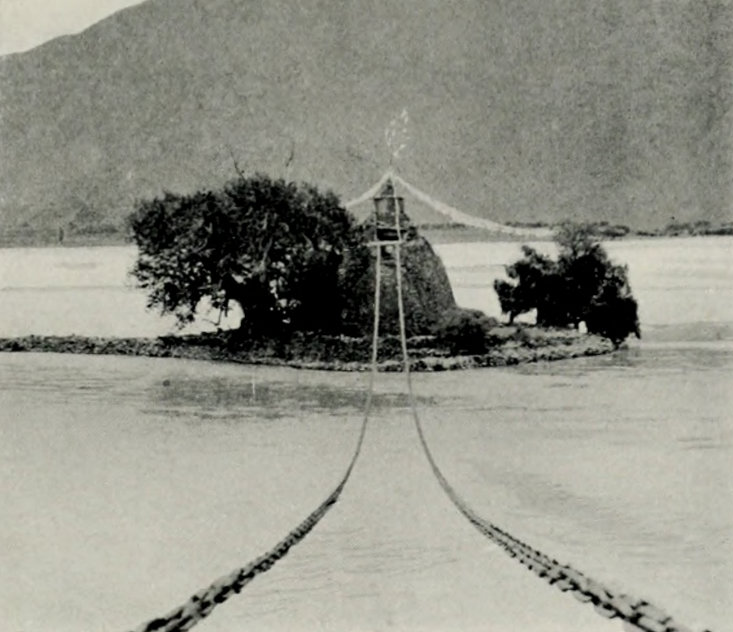
Chushul Chakzam

One of his iron chain suspension bridges, Chushul Chakzam, about 65 kilometres (40 mi) from Lhasa on the Yarlung Tsangpo River still existed in 1948, though it was in need of repairs and no longer used, the crossing being made by ferry. The old bridge was destroyed when a new one was opened about a hundred metres west of it. The old bridge was described as being of ancient design: "two thick chains are tied to heavy wooden beams underneath the pillars, from the top of which are suspended 12-foot (4 m) ropes hung from the chains and support wooden boards a yard (1 m) long and a foot (30 cm) broad, allowing passage for one man. The bridge is a hundred paces long."

At the south end of the Tsangpo bridge was Thangtong Gyalpo's main gompa founded in 1444, Chaksam Chuwo Ri (Tibetan: ལྕགས་ཟམ་ཆུ་བོ་རི) and he lived in the Chaksam Labrang, the main building of the complex which included the assembly hall. The gompa had a hundred monks supported by the toll on the bridge. There was also a large stupa known as "Tangtong's Kumbum" at the southern end of the bridge which contained his relics, and a chapel at the top contained an image of him. The gompa was destroyed during the Cultural Revolution. Dowman reports that "all evidence of its existence has now vanished".

== Teachers and students ==
=== Teachers ===
Thang Tong Gyalpo is said to have studied with over 500 teachers in Tibet, India, and Nepal. Part of the impetus for his intensive travel throughout the region was to meet and study with various Vajrayana tulkus, teachers, lineage holders, and yogis and yoginis.

==== The Dakini Niguma ====
One of Thang Tong Gyalpo's most important teachers was the great dakini Niguma. who visited him in visions three times over a period of years.

Thang Tong Gyalpo had other notable teachers as well who also offered him direct teachings of Niguma's spiritual practices. He

. . . received the transmission of her [Niguma's] instructions from the master Jangsem Jinpa Sangpo, passed down through the lineage of the "Seven Jewels" and Jagchungpa Tsangma Shangtön (1234−1309).73 He may also have studied the same instructions under the guidance of Dorjé Shönu and Müchen Namkhai Naljor, both disciples of Gyaltsen Palsang.

===== The first vision of Niguma =====
After receiving teachings from Jangsem Jinpa Sangpo, Thang Tong Gyalpo went into retreat and was visited in vision by Niguma. Niguma gave him "direct transmission" of the Six Yogas of Niguma.

During a profound visionary experience, the dakini Niguma herself bestowed upon him the four initiations, specific instructions concerning the esoteric significance of her Vajra Lines, and an extraordinary technique for transference of consciousness through meditation on the white and red forms of Khecarī. Tangtong's mastery of these practices is said to have given him the ability to instantly emanate many forms, to know what other people were thinking, and to perform the transference of consciousness from afar for the benefit of another person.

===== The second vision of Niguma =====
The second visionary visit of Niguma to Thang Tong Gyalpo was a few years later.

. . . Tangtong Gyalpo was traveling from his birthplace to Lhasa soon after he had returned to Tibet from Uddiyana. In a grove of juniper trees at a place called Sinpo Dzong (Demon Fort), he was approached again by the dakini Niguma, this time in the form of a fifteen-year-old shepherd girl. On this occasion she gave him special instructions concerning the sequence of visualizations during meditation, and bestowed the blessing of the illusory body.

===== The third vision of Niguma =====
Thang Tong's spiritual instructions from Niguma only were recorded many years later, in 1458. This was the same year of his third vision of Niguma.

. . . he finally received, in a third vision, permission to write down what Niguma had previously given him. This event occurred at Riwoché, and the instructions were recorded by Tangtong's disciple Lodrö Gyaltsen, through whom the major lineage was subsequently transmitted. These instructions, known as the Collection of the Essentials (Snying po kun ’dus), and a group of related teachings, have been passed down as the Tangtong Tradition (Thang lugs) of the Shangpa Kagyu lineage, and are among the few texts actually signed by the great adept.

==== Machig Labdrön ====
Thang Tong Gyalpo was also a Chöd practitioner.

=== Students ===
Chökyi Drönma, the Samding Dorje Phagmo, (1422–1455) was one of Thang Tong Gyalpo's students and his main consort. He is said to have recognized her as the incarnation of Vajravārāhī and to have associated her with this deity's prophecies, and later to have identified her reincarnation.

== Lineage founding ==
Thang Tong Gyalpo began a spiritual lineage called the Thangluk (Wylie: Thang lugs) or Chakzam "Iron Chain" (Wylie: lcags zam) lineage, inside of the Shangpa Kagyu school. What are known as the Collection of the Essentials (Snying po kun ’dus), along with a collection of related teachings, came to Thang Tong Gyalpo in visions from the great wisdom dakini Niguma. Thang Tong Gyalpo combined the Shangpa and Jangter "Northern Treasures" (Wylie: byang gter) teachings and traditions.

== Incarnation lineage ==
There is an incarnation line for Chakzampa Thang Tong Gyalpo, in Bhutan, that continues on into contemporary times. The current incarnation was born on the 16th of November, in 1973.

== Surviving prayers, spiritual practices, and empowerments ==
The teachings that are alive today are associated with the Shangpa Kagyu lineage, the "Northern Treasures" tradition, and within the cycles of Mahamudra Chöd.

=== Sādhanā and prayers ===
Thang Tong Gyalpo is known for writing an Avalokiteśvara sādhanā entitled For the Benefit of All Beings as Vast as the Skies, which is practiced in dharma centers today. In 2013 and in 2014, spiritual retreats were held at Rangjung Yeshe Gomde in Europe focused on this sadhana.

Other texts written by Thang Tong Gyalpo, and translated into English, can be found at Lotsawa House. They include a prayer for dispelling famine, a refuge practice to Thang Tong Gyalpo, and a prayer for pacifying the fear of disease. Contemporary social media has included postings containing prayers to Thang Tong Gyalpo to relieve suffering from earthquakes natural disasters as well.

=== Empowerments ===
Sakya Trizin gave the Vajrayana empowerment of Thang Tong Gyalpo's long life practice, called thangyal tsédrup (or bka' gter dag snang zung du 'brel ba'i tshe sgrub shin tu nye brgyud kyi sgrub thabs), at Lerab Ling in southern France in 2011.

== Thang Tong Gyalpo in Bhutan ==
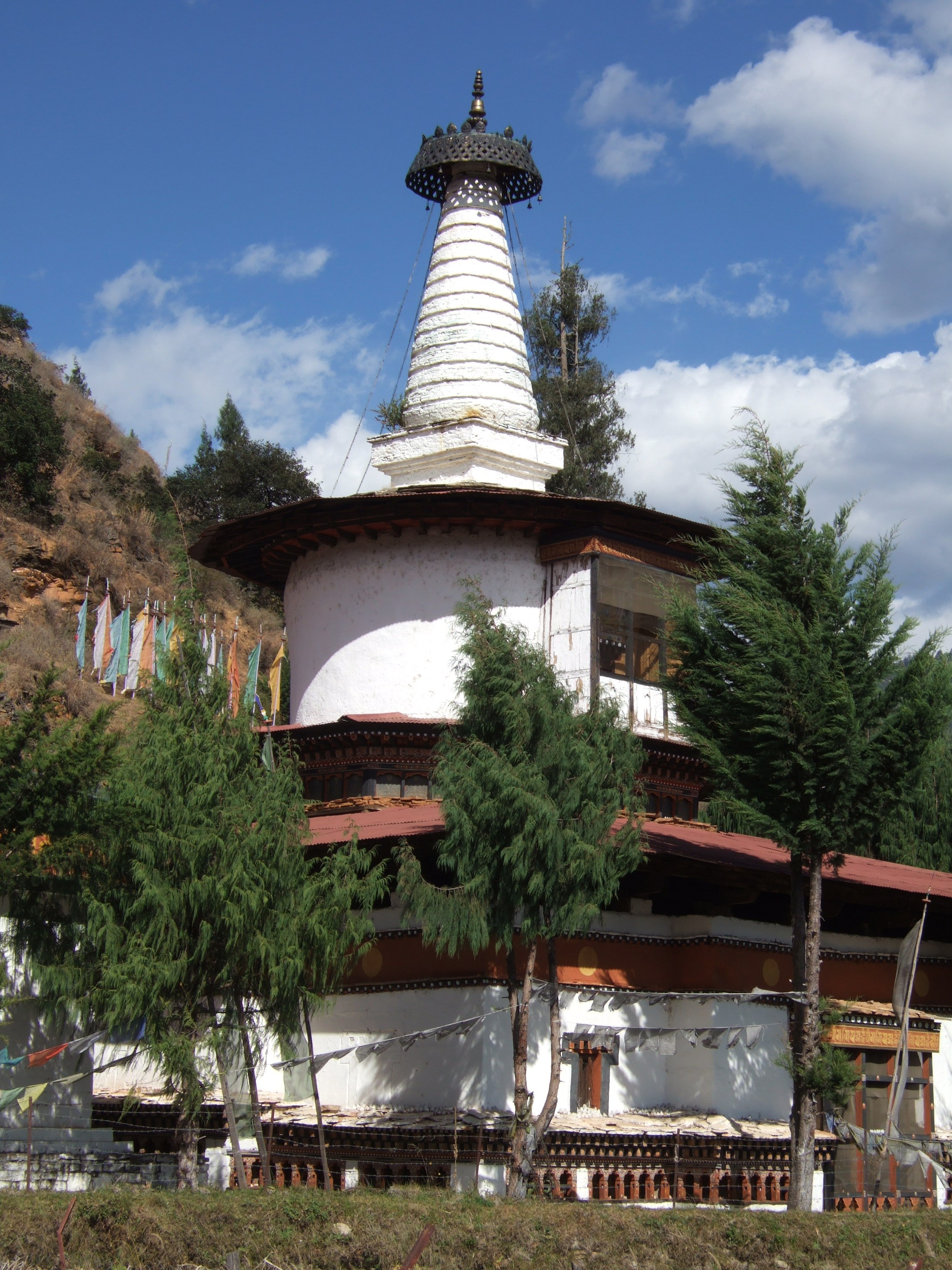
Jangtsa Dumtseg Lhakhang, built by Thangtong Gyalpo in Paro

In 1433, Drubthob Thangtong Gyalpo and his disciples traveled to Pagri in the Chumbi Valley of Tibet, and from there to Paro Taktsang in Bhutan. According to his biography, while performing rituals of Vajrakilaya there, he had a vision of the assembly of the Eight Classes of Heruka (Wylie: sgrub pa bka' brgyad) meditational deities with Vajrakumara as the central figure.

It is said that a nine-headed nāga spirit, who was the guardian of the sacred place of Paro Taktsang, declared "your religious inheritance was concealed here by Guru Rinpoche, please make your discovery and reveal it". There upon Drubchen Thangtong Gyalpo extracted a sacred scroll ten body lengths long from the cliff of Taktsang.

The line of mountains where Taktsang is located is shaped like a black snake with its head in the middle of the Paro valley. On the nose of this snake the Drubthob constructed Jangtsa Dumtseg Lhakhang, a stupa-shaped temple and pronounced that all diseases caused by evil spirits residing under the ground were suppressed and that the valley would be free from leprosy.

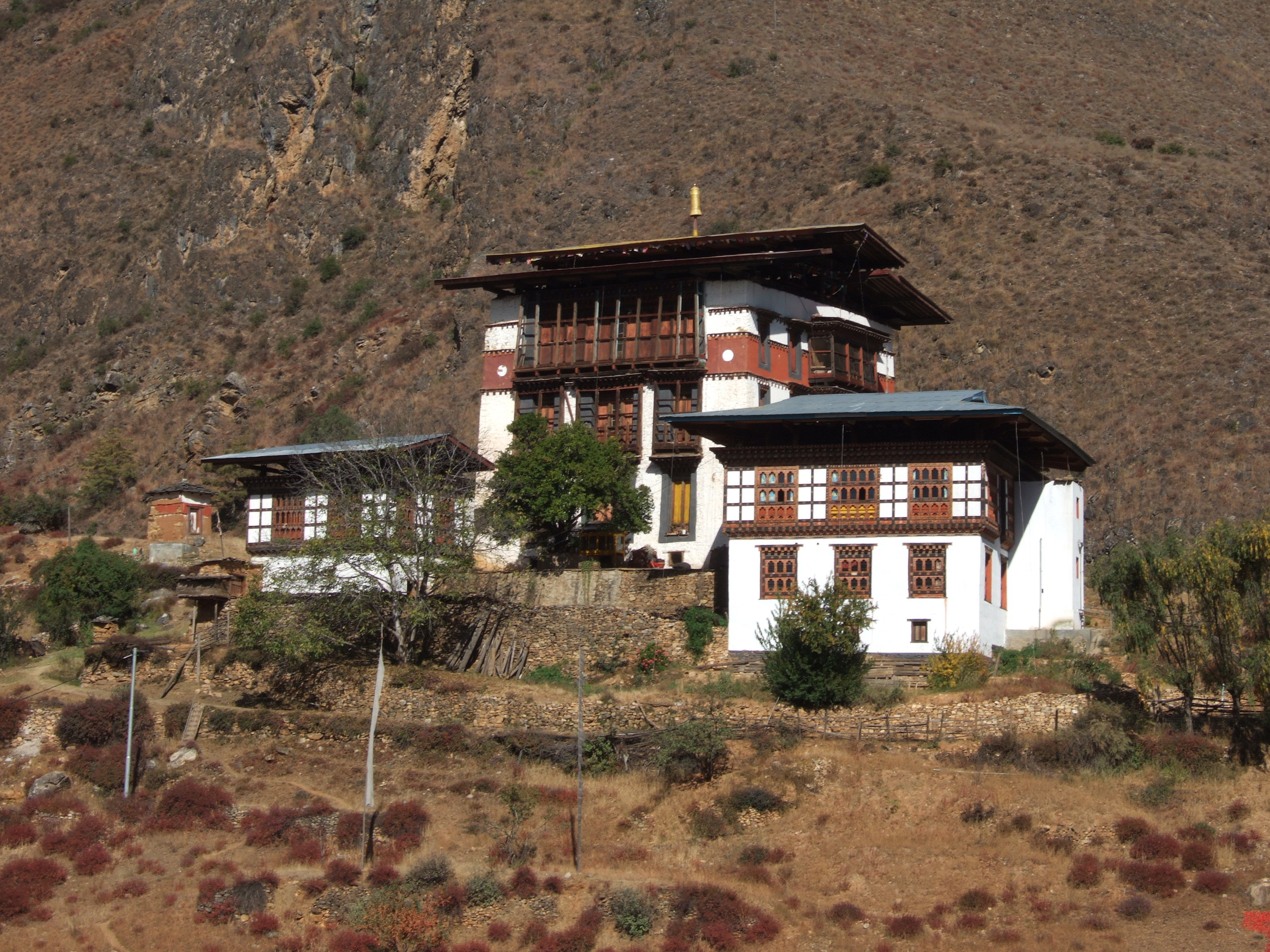
Tachog Lhakhang established by Thangtong Gyalpo

Arriving at a place called Phurdo, he saw a five-coloured rainbow upon which were seated

Buddha Amitabha, Avalokitesvara and Padmasambhava and declared that the place was as sacred as Potala mountain. At Tamchogang, at the foot of the Phurdo mountains, he established Tamchog Lhakhang temple and made sacred representations of the Buddha's body, speech and mind. This temple, which located opposite the road from Paro about 5 kilometres (3.1 mi) before Chudzom, is still maintained by the descendants of Drubtob Thang Tong Gyalpo.

From there he travelled to Drawang Tengchin where a rich man named Olag presented him three hundred and forty coins and turquoises and requested him to extract water. He did so and the water was sufficient to feed not only the people and cattle but also irrigate the fields. He then arrived at Gophog and told Lama Gyaltshen that he needed large quantities of iron to help him build links for compassionate purposes. Lama Gyaltshen answered that he would make available one hundred pieces of iron if the Drubthob could show him a proof of his attainment. The Drubthob told him to bring a boulder that was near the bridge which he split it into two just by pointing his finger. Within the stone they saw a live scorpion, the size of a thumb with innumerable of new-born scorpions. The Drubthob prayed in Samadhi and the insects instantly disappeared in the form of a rainbow and he proclaimed that he had sent them to Sukhavati

At Wundul Shari, he climbed a steep mountain cliff, impossible to climb by the ordinary humans and stayed there for a month. He said that the cliff contained caves like Tashigomang and the place resembled Shambhala in the north. However, he said, as the ordinary people could not go there, he had made a door. When the people looked up they found an opening that did not exist earlier on the face of the cliff. Then he travelled to Wundul, Gyaldung and Langsamar, and upper and lower Ha region. He converted the offerings that he received into iron and renovated the iron bridge there. Then he went back to Dromo Dorje Gur in Tibet.

From there, he travelled again to Thimphu and Thud valleys where he built an iron bridge at Bardrong. His journey then took him to Rued and Kunzangling where Lama Thuchen presented him with two hundred and fifty pieces of iron. It is said that he also built the Chiwotokha Lhakhang [in Shar district] during this visit. He took all the offerings, including the iron pieces, to Paro. Turning himself into eighteen persons, he went into different villages such as Dolpoiphu, Tsharlungnang, Dungkhar, Jiwu, Nyagbu and Lholingkha, and instructed eighteen blacksmiths to forge iron links.

After about three months, he had seven thousand iron links and many iron hammers and bars. At Kewangphug and other places, he built stupas to subdue the spirits of these areas. At Changlungkha Rawakha, Nyal Phagmodrong, Tachogang, Wundul Dronkar, Silung, Bagdrong, Binangkhachey, Daglha, Gyirling and Nyishar, he conducted a lot of religious activities by providing image, scripture, stupa, iron bridges and established meditation centres.

When he returned to Phari, the patrons and monks of the new monastery in Paro, reached one thousand four hundred loads of iron (fifteen pieces of iron making a load), and seven hundred loads of ink, paper and other goods to Phari.

The bridge can be still seen today featuring majestically on the hill beside the river of Pa-chu. The suspension bridge was very old enough during the year of 2017 thus it is closed for either renovation or for people's safety.

== Death ==
Thangtong Gyalpo is said to have "passed away bodily, in the way of a sky-farer" in his 125th year at Riwoche.

== Bibliography ==
- Diemberger, Hildegard (2014). When a Woman Becomes a Religious Dynasty: The Samding Dorje Phagmo of Tibet. Columbia University Press. ISBN 978-0-231-14321-9.
- Dudjom Jigdral Yeshe Dorje (2012). The Nyingma School of Tibetan Buddhism: Its Fundamentals and History. Simon and Schuster. ISBN 978-0-86171-734-7.
- Gerke, Barbara (2011). Long Lives and Untimely Deaths: Life-Span Concepts and Longevity Practices Among Tibetans in the Darjeeling Hills, India. Brill. ISBN 978-90-04-21703-4.
- Gerner, Manfred Chakzampa Thangtong Gyalpo - Architect, Philosopher and Iron Chain Bridge Builder. Thimphu: Center for Bhutan Studies 2007. ISBN 99936-14-39-4 - This book details Thangtong Gyalpo's bridge building activities and discusses his possible influence on European chain suspension bridges. With photographs of a number of his bridges which survive to the present.
- Gyatso, Janet: "Thang-strong rGyal-po, Father of the Tibetan Drama Tradition: The Bodhisattva as Artist" in Jamyang Norbu (1986). Zlos Gar: Performing Traditions of Tibet. Library of Tibetan Works & Archives.
- Stearns, Cyrus. The Life and Teachings of the Tibetan Saint Thang-strong rgyal-po, "King of the Empty Plain" (Univ. Washington, Master's thesis, 1980)
- Stearns, Cyrus (2015). King of the Empty Plain: The Tibetan Iron-Bridge Builder Tangtong Gyalpo. Shambhala Publications. ISBN 978-1-55939-837-4.
- Vitali, Roberto (1990). Early Temples of Central Tibet. Serindia Publications. ISBN 978-0-906026-25-0.
