= Gonchen Monastery =

Tibetan Buddhist monastery in Derge, Sichuan, China

- Tibetan transcription(s); Tibetan: སྡེ་དགེ་དགོན་ཆེན; Wylie transliteration: sde dge dgon chen Other transcriptions: Dege Gönchen; Chinese transcription(s); Traditional: 更慶寺; Simplified: 更庆寺; Pinyin: Gèngqìng Sì
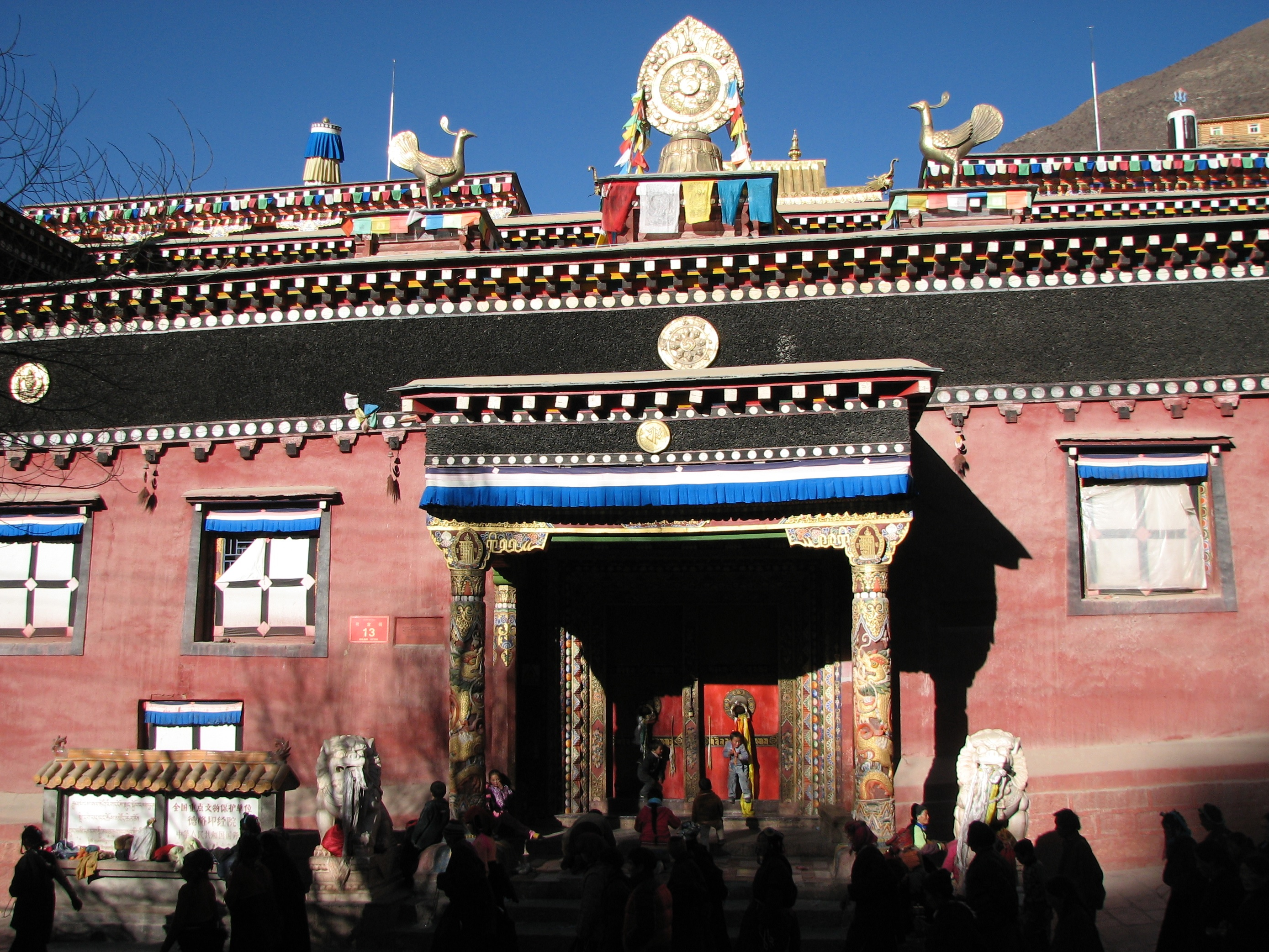

- Location within China

Religion
- Affiliation: Tibetan Buddhism
- Sect: Sakya
- Deity: Padmasambhava, Sakyamuni Buddha (Sakya Thukpa) and the future Buddha, Jampa or Maitreya

Location
- Location: Sichuan, China
- Country: China
- Interactive map of Gonchen Monastery
- Coordinates: 31.572°N 98.347°E

Architecture
- Style: The monastery has a notable design, with striped walls of white, dark red and gray, colors unique to the Sakya sect
- Founder: Thang Tong Gyalpo (or Tangton Gyelpo), 1385-1464 CE
- Established: 15th century

Gonchen Monastery (Tibetan: དགོན་ཆེན་དགོན་, Wylie: dgon chen dgon, ZWPY: Gönqên Gön), also known as Derge Monastery (Tibetan: སྡེ་དགེ་དགོན་ཆེན, Wylie: sde dge dgon chen), is a large Sakya Tibetan Buddhist monastery in the town of Derge, in Sichuan, China. Gonchen is located in the ethnic Tibetan cultural region of Kham.

== Description ==
The main chapel of the monastery is an extensive complex which resulted in it being called the "great monastery". The monastery has a notable design, with striped walls of white, dark red and gray, colors unique to the Sakya sect of Tibetan Buddhism.

Below the monastery itself is the famous Derge Parkhang (Printing House), built in 1729, where the Buddhist scriptures the Kangyur and the Tengyur and other Buddhist works are still printed from wooden blocks in traditional handwork. The printing house, run by monks of the monastery, continues to use ancient techniques and uses no electricity. The roof is used for drying the printed sheets. It houses some 217,000 engraved blocks of scriptures from all Tibetan Buddhist sects including the Bon and about 2,500 pages are hand-produced each day by monks in the traditional manner. Upstairs in the same building older printers produce prints on both cloth and paper. Workers carve new wooden printing blocks in the administrative building opposite the monastery which is protected from earthquakes and fire by the goddess Drolma, an emanation of Tara.

Tangyel Lhakhang is a secondary temple to the west of Gonchen Monastery's main temple.

== History ==
Gonchen Monastery was founded by Thang Tong Gyalpo (or Tangton Gyelpo) (1385-1464), a Buddhist yogi and polymath, physician, and treasure finder, renowned for founding of Ache Lhamo, the Tibetan opera, and the numerous iron suspension bridges he constructed throughout the Himalayan region. He is said to have made 108 of them, the most celebrated being the one over the Yarlung Tsangpo near modern Chushul. He is often shown in murals with long white hair and holding some chain links from his bridges.

The monastery was completely destroyed during the Cultural Revolution.

The monastery was restored in the 1980s and the three inner sanctums are dedicated to Guru Rinpoche (Padmasambhava), Sakyamuni Buddha (Sakya Thukpa) and the future Buddha, Jampa or Maitreya. On the way downhill to the printing press there is a small alley which leads off to the left to the Tangton Gyelpo Chapel (Tangyel Lhakhang).

=== Recent events ===
On 27 January 2009, a protest involving several Tibetan monks near the monastery was crushed by police by gunfire and detentions, according to the Tibetan Center for Human Rights and Democracy citing reports from the region. The monks were released four days later but, according to sources cited by the Voice of Tibet, 30 had been badly injured following beatings and torture.

== Gallery ==
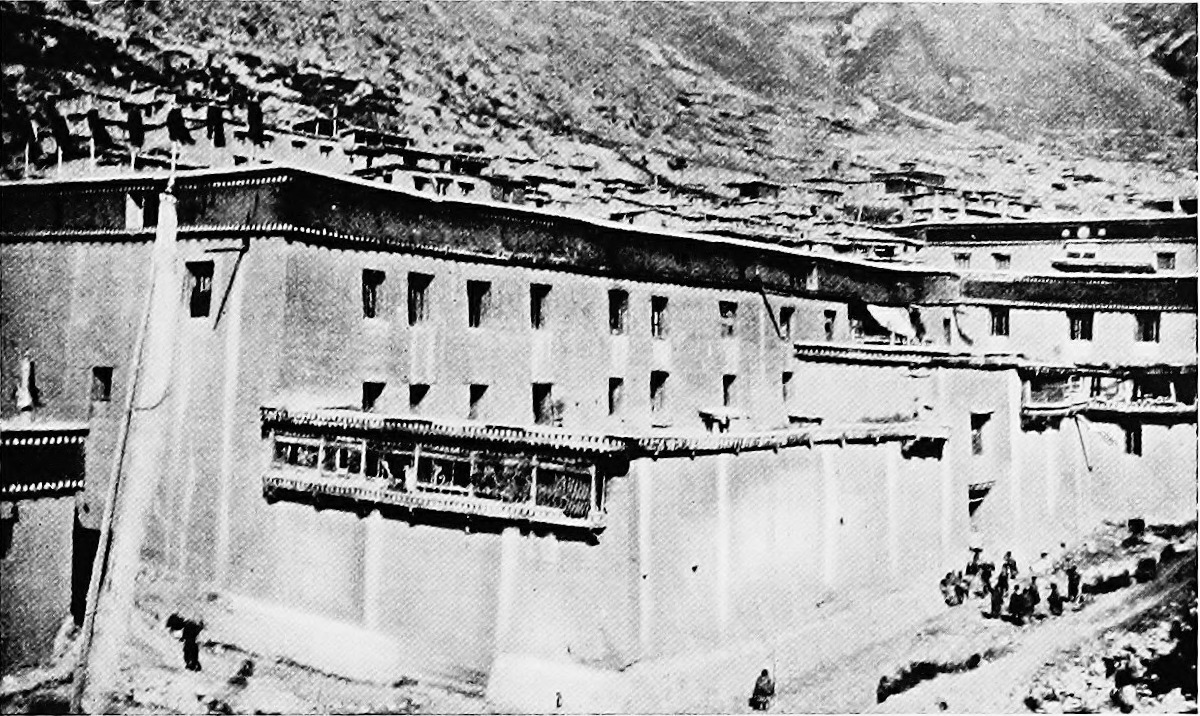
A photograph by Eric Teichman showing the palace of the Derge kings as it appeared in 1918. Located next to the monastery, the palace was demolished after 1950, and a school was built on the site.

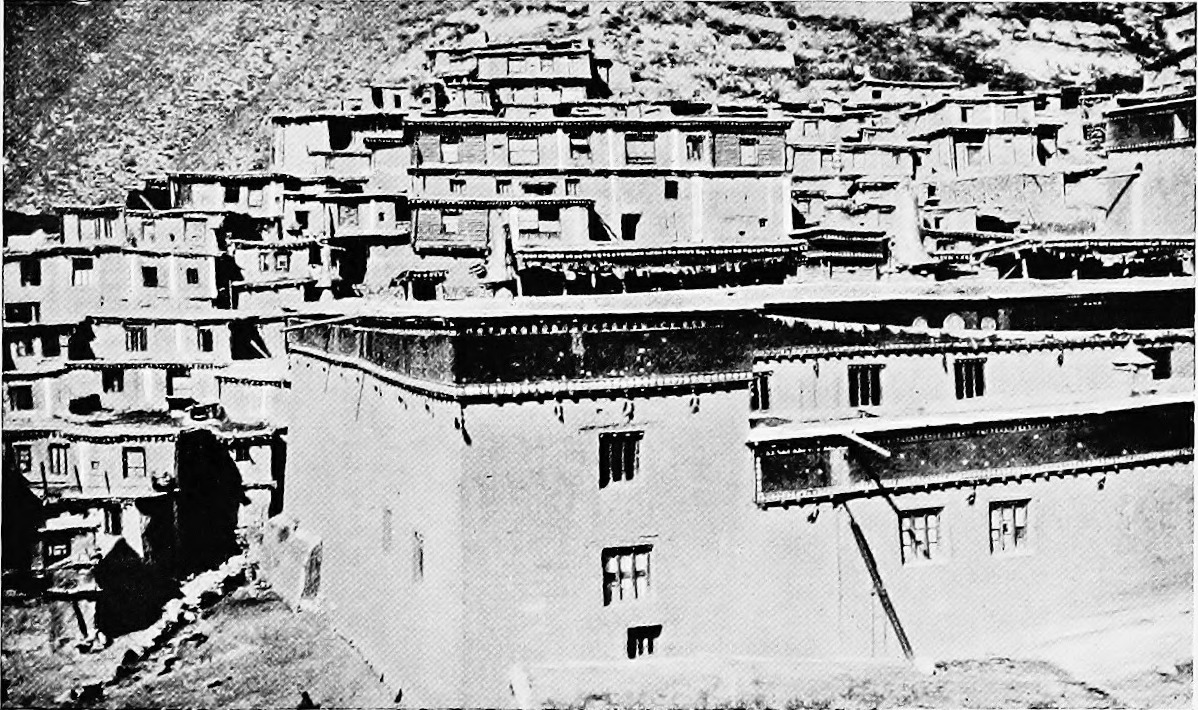
A corner of the three-storey monastic print house (Derge Parkhang) in 1918, with parts of the larger monastery visible in the background above.

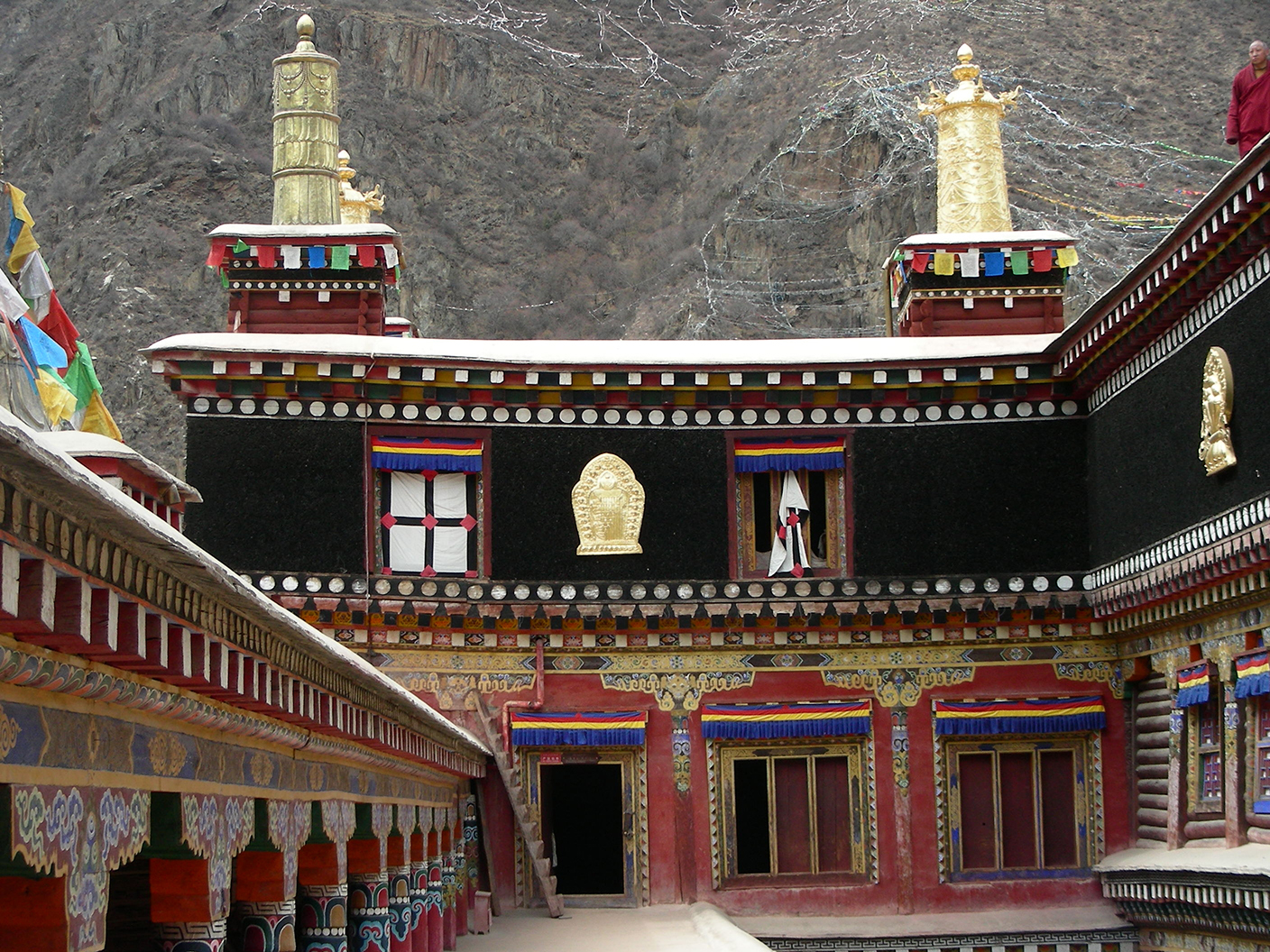
The monastic print house, photographed in 2012 following restoration work. Originally built between 1729 and 1750, the press was closed in the 1950s under Chinese rule and turned into a hospital, but it was allowed to reopen in 1979.

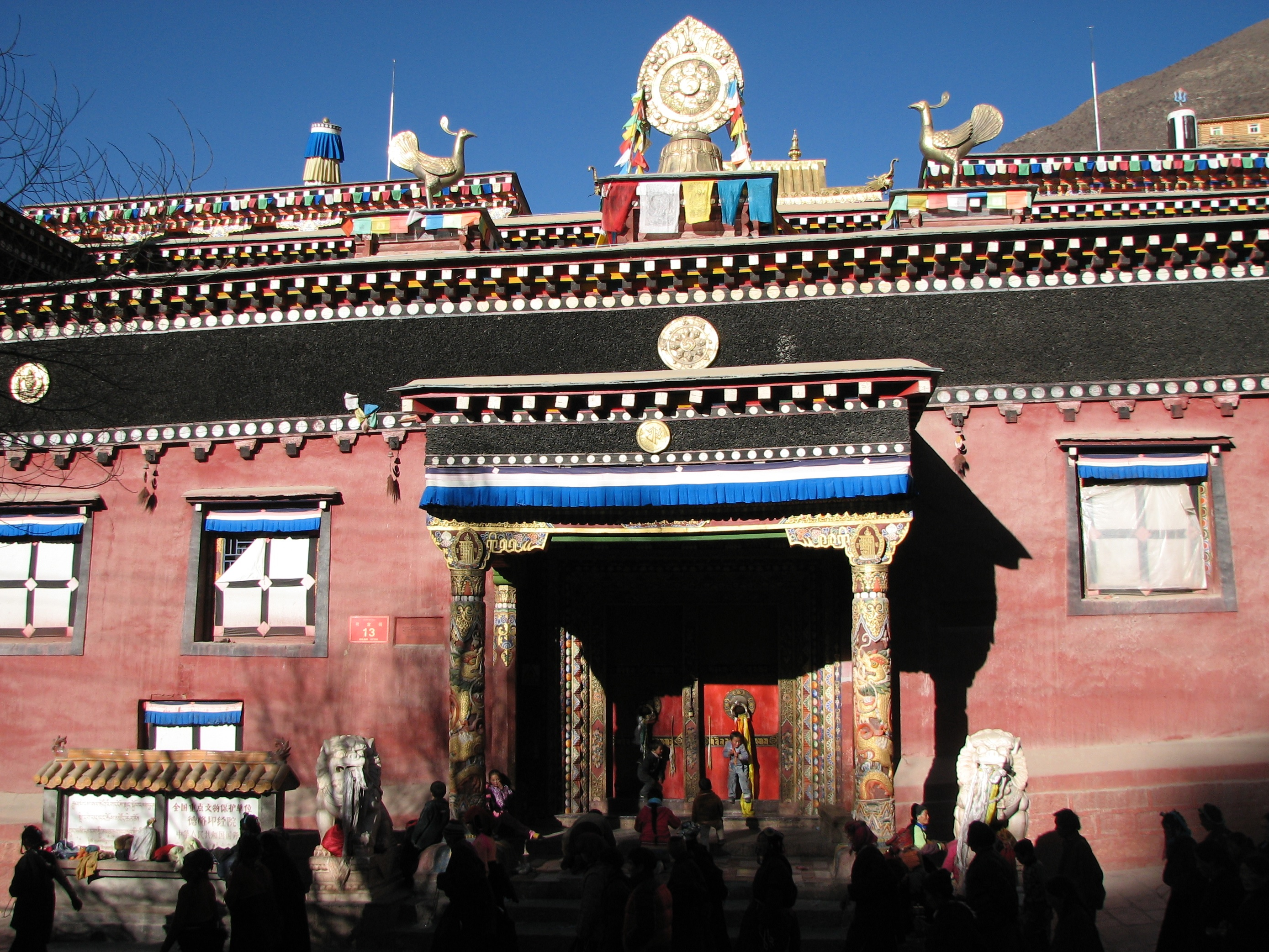
The main entrance to the Parkhang (2015). The building is considered sacred, and pilgrims traditionally visit to circumambulate it.

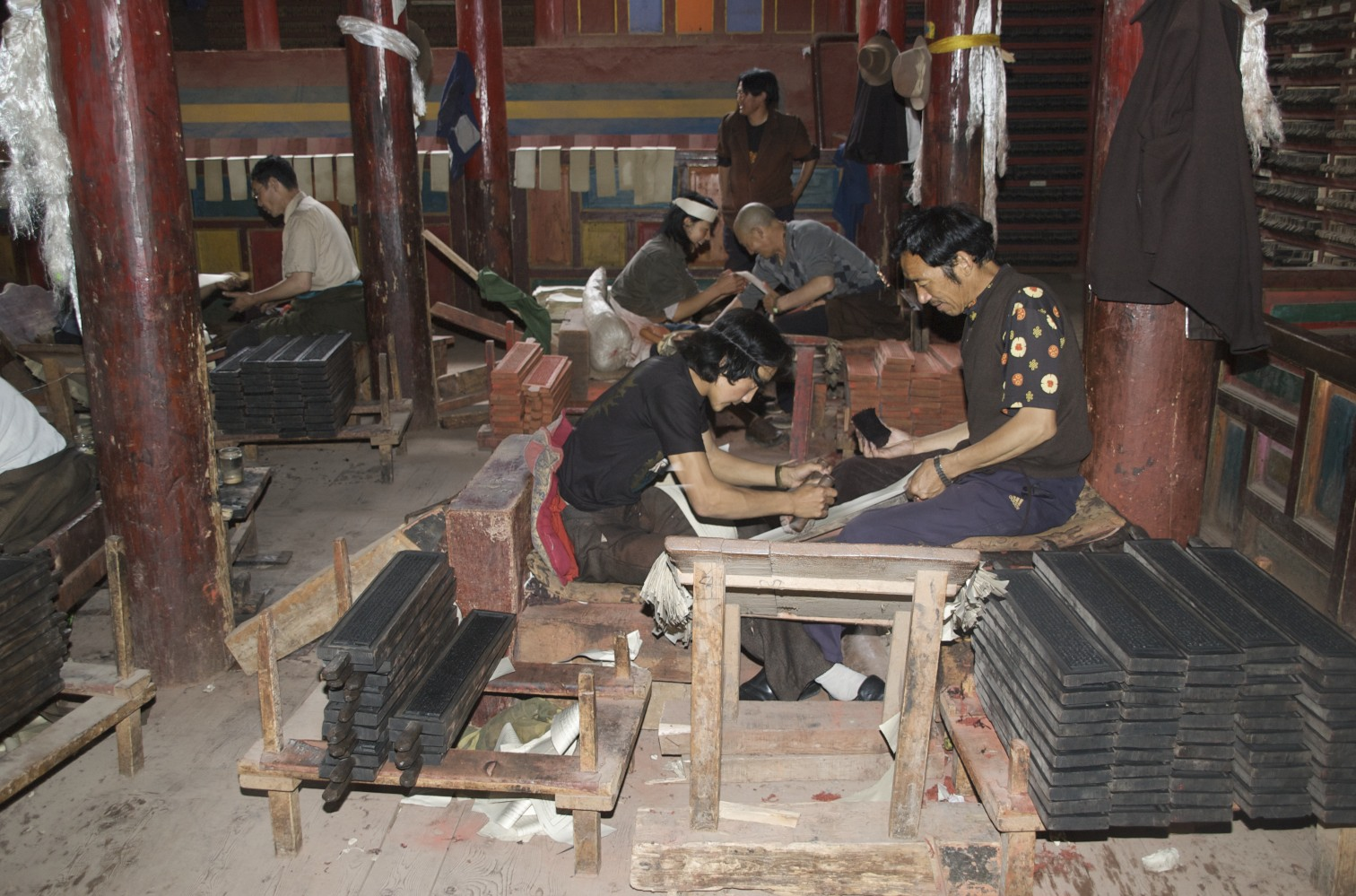
People printing books inside the monastic print house in 2009 (photograph Mario Biondi). More than a hundred workers manually print secular and religious books from hand-cut woodblocks.

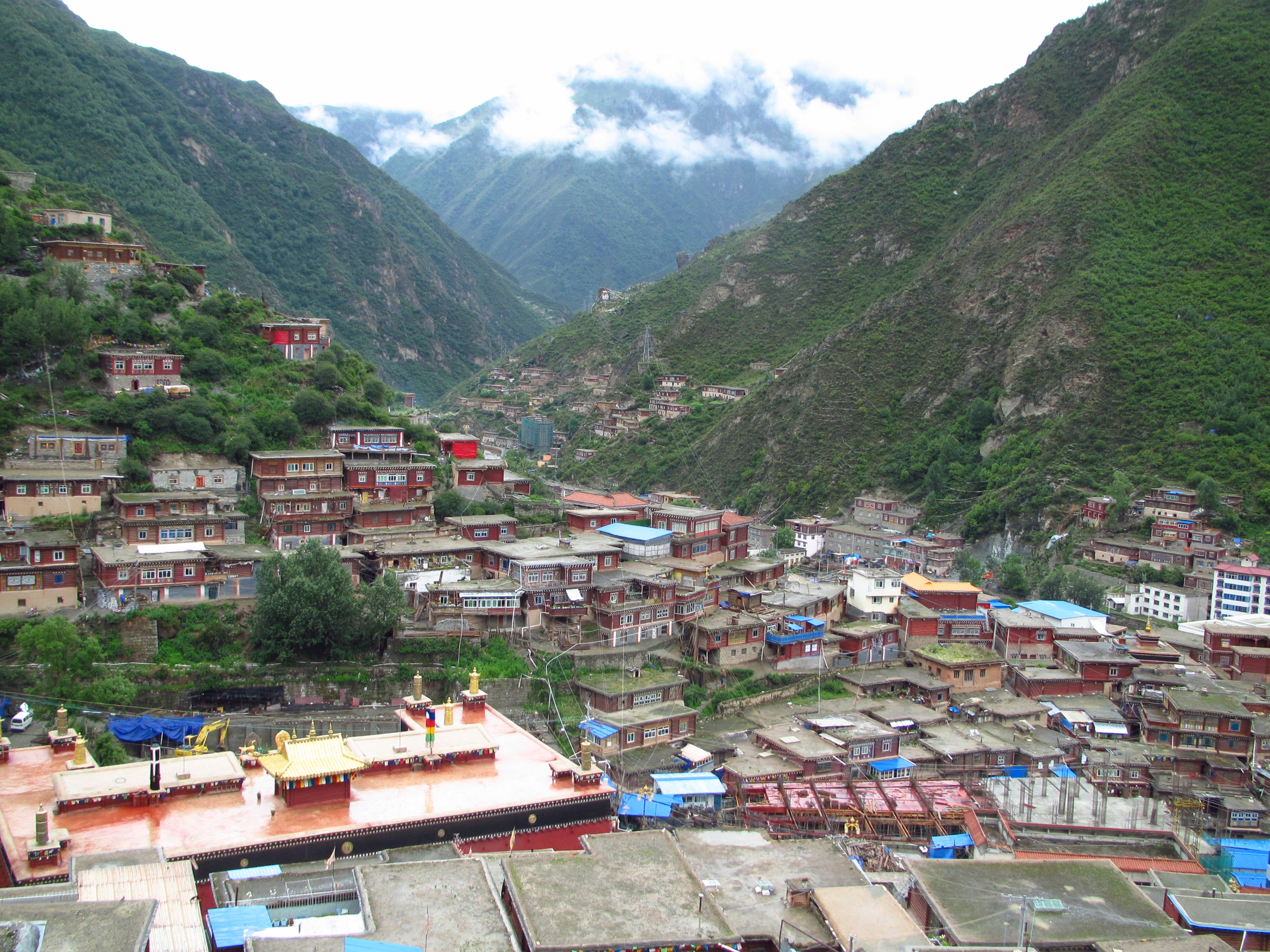
View of the town of Derge (2014), where the monastery is situated.
