= Ngamring County =

Ngamring County 昂仁县 • ངམ་རིང་རྫོང་།
- County
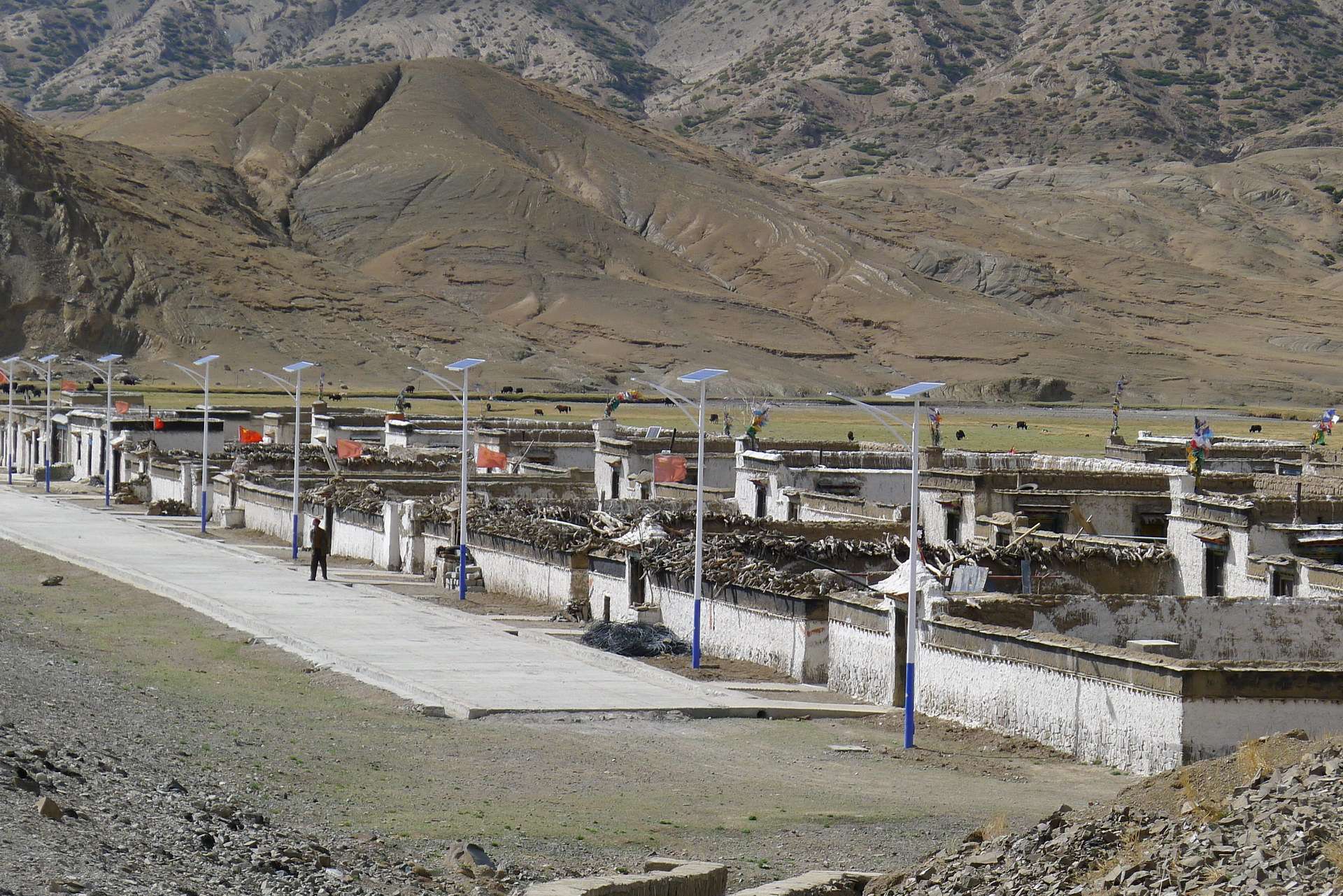
- Jucang Village along the G219 highway

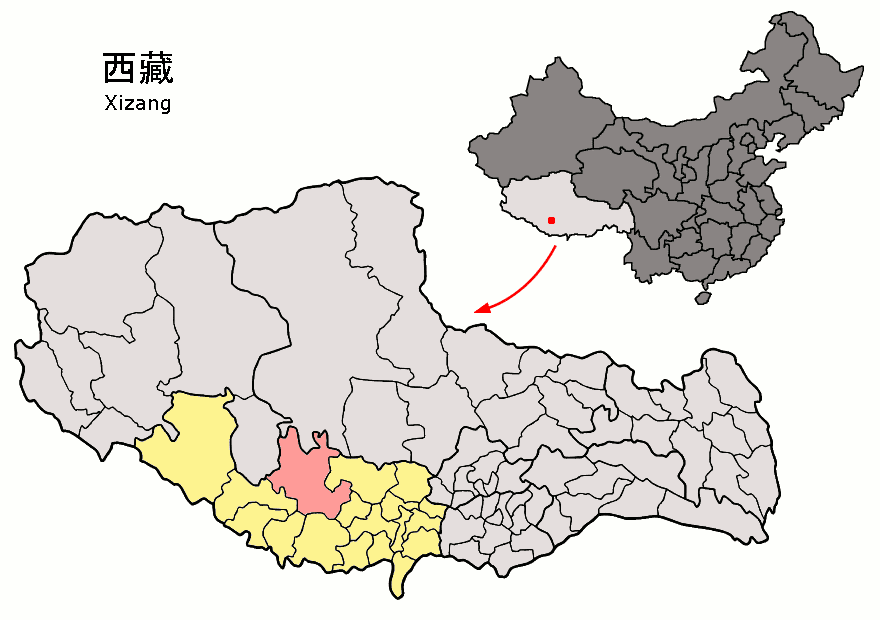
- Location of Ngamring County (red) within Xigazê City (yellow) and Tibet

- Location of the seat in Tibet Ngamring (China)
- Coordinates: 29°16′22″N 87°10′57″E
- Country: China
- Autonomous region: Tibet
- Prefecture-level city: Xigazê
- County seat: Kagar

Area
  - Total: 28,205.88 km^{2} (10,890.35 sq mi)

Population (2020)
  - Total: 55,108
  - Density: 1.9538/km^{2} (5.0603/sq mi)
- Time zone: UTC+8 (China Standard)
- Website: www.arx.gov.cn

Ngamring County

Chinese name
- Simplified Chinese: 昂仁县
- Traditional Chinese: 昂仁縣
Transcriptions
Standard Mandarin
- Hanyu Pinyin: Ángrén Xiàn

Tibetan name
- Tibetan: ངམ་རིང་རྫོང་།
Transcriptions
- Wylie: ngam ring rdzong
- Tibetan Pinyin: Ngamring Zong

Ngamring County (Tibetan: ངམ་རིང་རྫོང་།; Chinese: 昂仁县) is a county of Xigazê in the Tibet Autonomous Region, China. "Ngamring County, sometimes referred to as the gateway to Mount Kailash and Far West Tibet, is the barren area which divides the Raga Tsangpo and the Brahmaputra."

The office place of the county is located in Kagar, population 1,700, at an elevation of 4,380 m (14,370 ft).

== Administration divisions ==
Ngamring County is divided into 2 towns and 15 townships.

Name	Chinese	Hanyu Pinyin	Tibetan	Wylie
Towns
Gegang Town (Kagar, Kaika)	卡嘎镇	Kǎgā zhèn	གད་སྒང་གྲོང་རྡལ།	gad sgang grong rdal
Sangsang Town	桑桑镇	Sāngsāng zhèn	བཟང་བཟང་གྲོང་རྡལ།	bzang bzang grong rdal
Townships
Darog Township	达若乡	Dáruò xiāng	རྟ་རོག་ཤང་།	rtag rog shang
Goin'gyibug Township	贡久布乡	Gòngjiǔbù xiāng	དགོན་སྐྱིད་སྦུག་ཤང་།	dgon skyid sbug shang
Comë Township	措迈乡	Cuòmài xiāng	ཚོ་སྨད་ཤང་།	mtsho smad shang
Xungba Township	雄巴乡	Xióngbā xiāng	གཞུང་བ་ཤང་།	gzhung ba shang
Cazê Township	查孜乡	Cházī xiāng	ཚྭ་རྩེ་ཤང་།	tswa rtse shang
Amxung Township	阿木雄乡	Āmùxióng xiāng	ཨམ་གཞུང་ཤང་།	am gzhung shang
Rusar Township	如萨乡	Rúsà xiāng	རུ་གསར་ཤང་།	ru gsar shang
Kunglung Township	孔隆乡	Lǒnglóng xiāng	གུང་ལུང་ཤང་།	gung lung shang
Nyigo Township	尼果乡	Níguǒ xiāng	ཉི་སྒོ་ཤང་།	nyi sgo shang
Riwoqê Township	日吾其乡	Rìwúqí xiāng	རི་བོ་ཆེ་ཤང་།	ri bo che shang
Dobê Township	多白乡	Duōbái xiāng	མདོ་སྤེ་ཤང་།	mdo spe shang
Kairag Township	切热乡	Qiērè xiāng	གད་རགས་ཤང་།	gad rags shang
Qu'og Township	秋窝乡	Qiūwō xiāng	ཆུ་འོག་ཤང་།	chu 'og shang
Dagyu Township	达居乡	Dájū xiāng	རྟ་རྒྱུད་ཤང་།	stag rgyud shang
Yagmo Township	亚木乡	Yàmù xiāng	ཡག་མོ་ཤང་།	yag mo shang

== Landmarks and monasteries ==
The Chung Riwoche Stupa is located on the north bank of the Brahmaputra. "A narrow iron bridge spans the river here, alongside an original iron-chain footbridge attributed to Tangtong Gyelpo," the founder of Tibetan opera, who was born in Ngamring County. "Legend has it that the iron chain bridge over the Xiongqoi River ... was built with funds collected by Tongdong Gyaibo through performances."

Another point of interest is the Ralung Chutse hot spring, which has camping and a guest house.

Zangzang Lhadrak Cave in Ngamring County was where Padmasambhava hid the "Northern Treasures," which consisted of "a number of texts and various sacred objects in a maroon leather casket." These texts and objects were removed in 1366 by Vidyadhara Gödem, and became known as the Dzö Nga (mdzod lnga) or Five Treasuries. The "Northern Treasures" were taught at the Dorje Drak Monastery, and include the Künzang Gongpa Zangtha teachings, a collection of Dzogchen instructions.

Ngamring Monastery or Ngamring Chöde (Wylie: ngam ring chos sde ) produced many important scholars. It was founded in 1225 as a Sakya monastery when "the Ngamring ruler Drakpa Dar (Grags pa dar), also known as Yöntsun (Yon btsun), invited the Sakya master Shākya Sengé (Shākya seng ge) to Ngamring and founded the monastery there."

It was later expanded by the governor Tai En Namkha Tenpa (Ta'i dben Nam mkha' brtan pa, b. 1316) with the assistance of his teacher, the Omniscient Dolpopa Sherab Gyaltsen (Dol po pa Shes rab rgyal mtshan, 1292-1361).

The monastery also followed the Jonang and Bodongpa traditions. It became a Gelugpa monastery at the time of the 5th Dalai Lama. "Tangtong Gyalpo's teacher Ka Ngapa Paljor Sherab (Bka' lnga pa Dpal 'byor shes rab) was the ninth abbot."

== Transport ==
- China National Highway 219

== Notable persons ==
- Thang Tong Gyalpo (1385–1464 or 1361–1485), builder of iron bridges and father of Tibetan opera

== Gallery ==
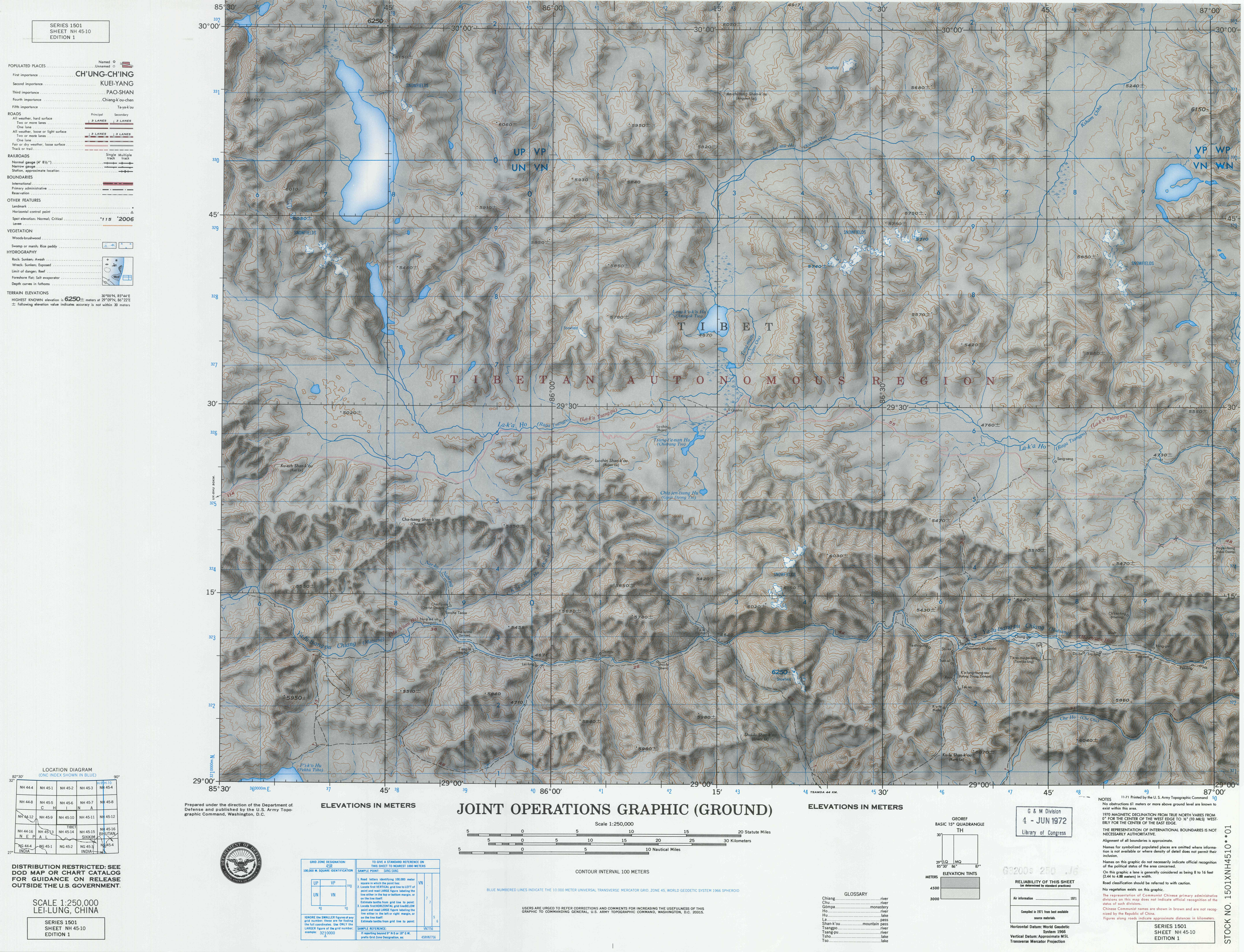
Map including part of Ngamring County (ATC, 1971)

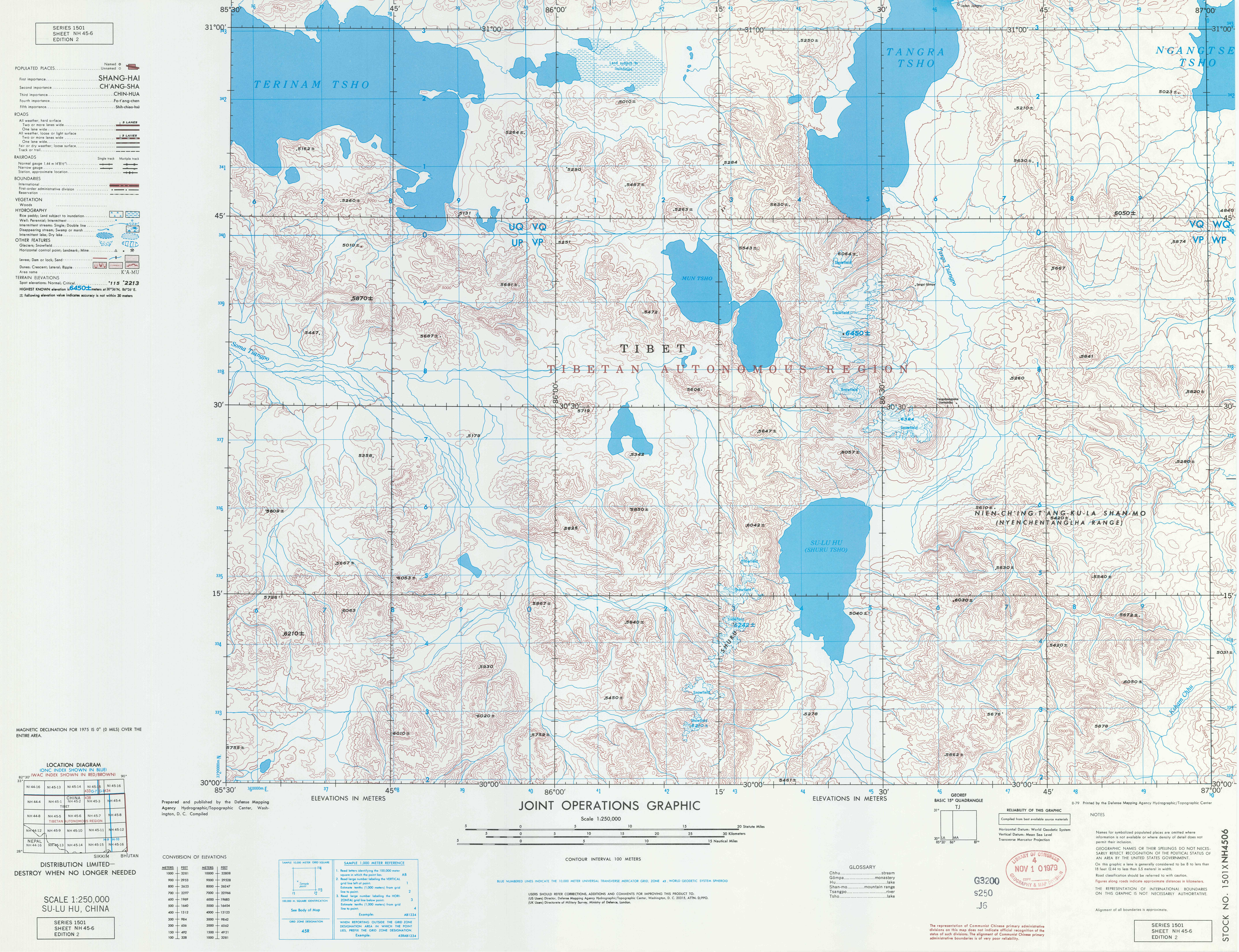
