= Goin'gyibug Township =

Goin'gyibug དགོན་སྐྱིད་སྦུག་ · 贡久布乡
- Location within Tibet
- Coordinates: 30°36′54″N 87°01′14″E
- Country: People's Republic of China
- Autonomous region: Tibet
- Prefecture-level city: Shigatse
- County: Ngamring

Population
  - Total
  - Major Nationalities: Tibetan
  - Regional dialect: Tibetan language
- Time zone: UTC+8 (CST)

Goin'gyibug (Tibetan: དགོན་སྐྱིད་སྦུག་; simplified Chinese: 贡久布乡; traditional Chinese: 貢久布鄉; pinyin: Gòngjiǔbù Xiāng) is a township in the northeast of Ngamring County, north-central Shigatse, western Tibet Autonomous Region, China. It has six villages under its administration.

== See also ==
- List of towns and villages in Tibet
