= Chushul Chakzam =

Historic bridge and river crossing near Lhasa, Tibet

Chushul Chakzam ཆུ་ཤུལ་ལྕགས་ཟམ
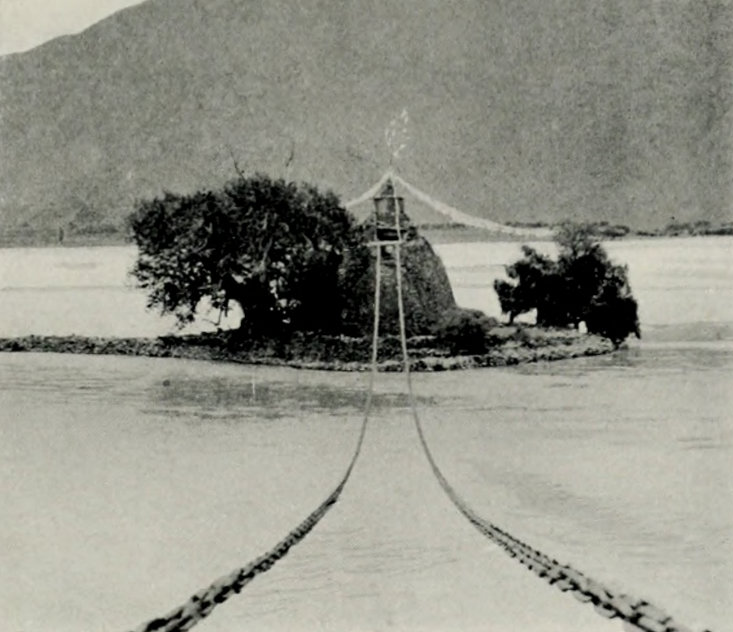
- Old Chain-Bridge at Chaksam.
- Coordinates: 29°19′38.31″N 90°41′9.56″E
- Crosses: Yarlung Tsangpo
- Locale: Qüxü County, Lhasa Prefecture, Tibet Autonomous Region

Characteristics
- Design: Suspension bridge
- Material: Iron suspension
- Trough construction: Plank footway
- Pier construction: Stone piers
- Total length: 150 yards (140 m)
- Width: 30 centimetres (12 in)
- Height: 15 feet (4.6 m)

History
- Designer: Thang Tong Gyalpo
- Opened: 1430
- Closed: 1950s
- Replaced by: Qushui Yaluzangbujiang Bridge

Location
- Interactive map of Chushul Chakzam

- Chushul Chakzam

Tibetan name
- Tibetan: ཆུ་ཤུལ་ལྕགས་ཟམ
Transcriptions
- Wylie: chu shul lcags zam
- THL: chu shül chak zam

- Chaksam Chuwori

Tibetan name
- Tibetan: ལྕགས་ཟམ་ཆུ་བོ་རི
Transcriptions
- Wylie: lcags zam chu bo ri
- THL: chak zam chuwo ri

The Chushul Chakzam (Tibetan: ཆུ་ཤུལ་ལྕགས་ཟམ), or simply Chakzam which literally means "iron bridge" in Standard Tibetan, was a suspension bridge that spanned the Yarlung Tsangpo river in modern-day Qüxü County near Lhasa, Tibet. It was built in 1430 by Thang Tong Gyalpo. The southern bridgehead was built on the mountain Chowuri, which is sacred in Tibetan Buddhism. This mountain was a site where Guru Rinpoche and Trisong Detsen had meditated during the 8th Century. When it was built, its main section was the longest unsupported span in the world, with a central span estimated at around 150 yards (140 metres).

In 1444, a monastery Chaksam Chuwori (Tibetan: ལྕགས་ཟམ་ཆུ་བོ་རི) was founded on the southern bridgehead. During its existence, the monastery served as the seat of Chakzampa school of Tibetan Buddhism. Supported by the bridge toll, the monastery at one point hosted about 100 monks. The monastery was destroyed during the Cultural Revolution.

== History ==
By the 1860s, the bridge was in such a state of disrepair that a ferry was in operation slightly upstream offering safer passage. By 1904, the river had overflown the north bank leaving the northern bridgehead on an island, thus rendering the bridge functionally ineffective. The ferryman mostly came from a nearby village of Chun or Junba, which is the only fishing village in Tibet. The ferry service continued as late as 1959.

During the Qing expedition to Tibet of 1910, the 13th Dalai Lama decided to seek refuge in India. His general Tsarong fought a skirmish against the Chinese here, holding their advances allowing the Dalai Lama to safely arrive in India.

The bridge was torn down by the Chinese government in the 1950s when they were building the concrete bridge in its place. The new concrete bridge Qushui Yaluzangbujiang Bridge opened on August 1, 1966.

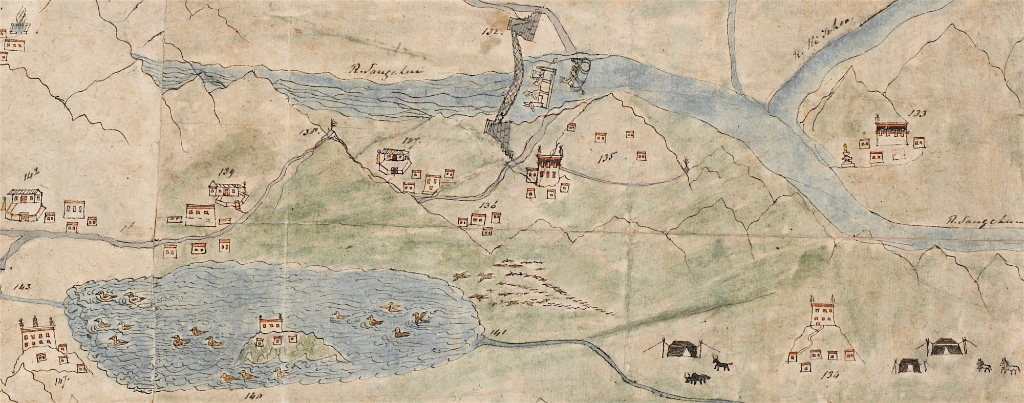
Chaksam ferry as depicted in this map from mid-1800s showing an iron chain bridge, a horse head ferry, and a yak-hide boat.

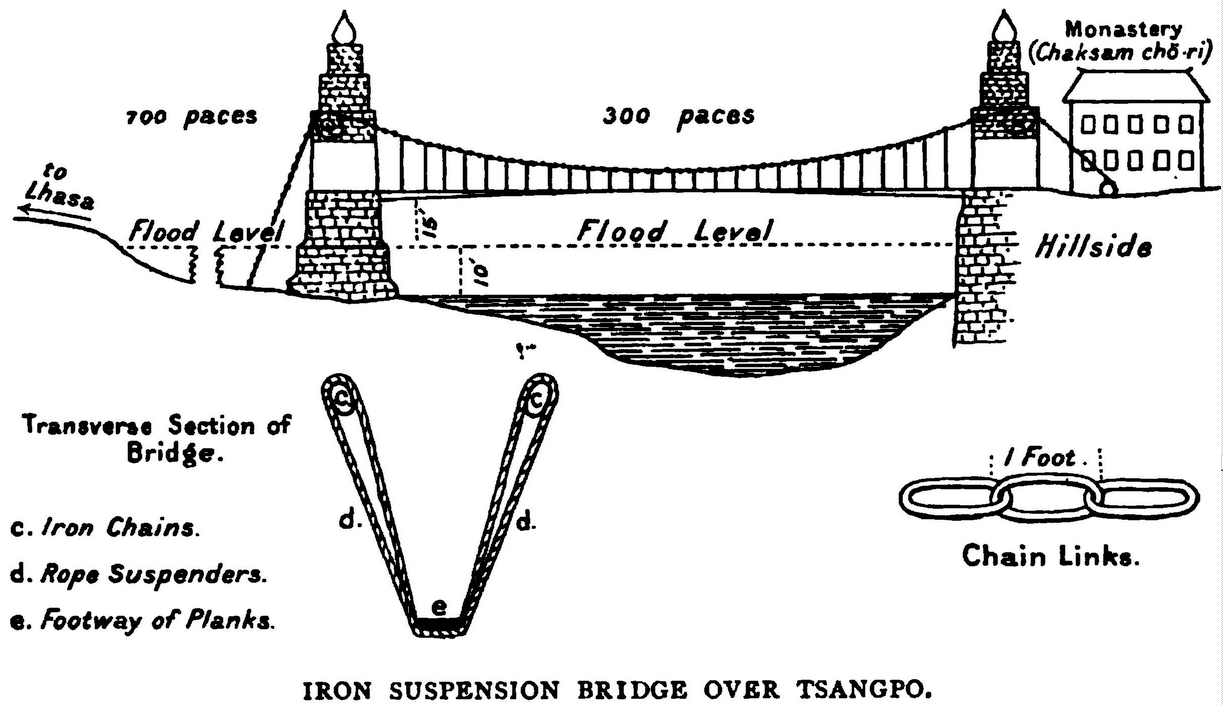
Diagram by an Indian spy working for the Survey of India in 1878

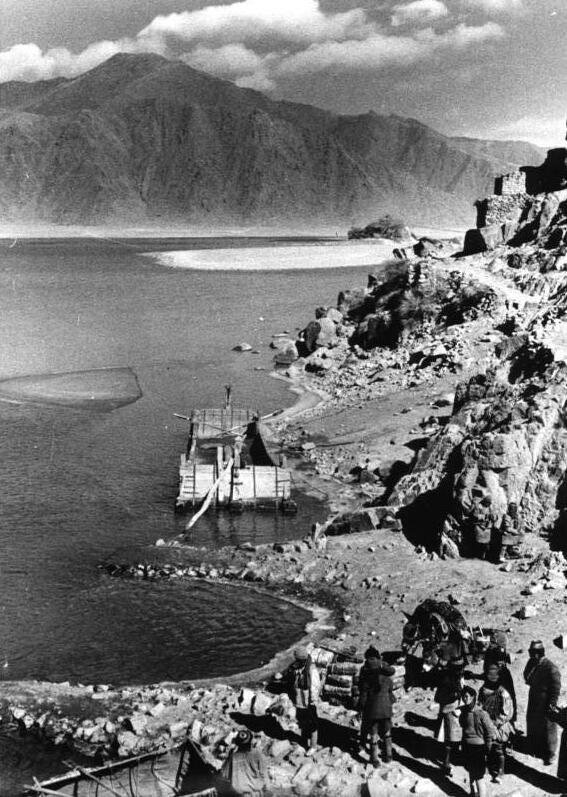
Chakzam Ferry as photoed by Ernst Schäfer in 1938

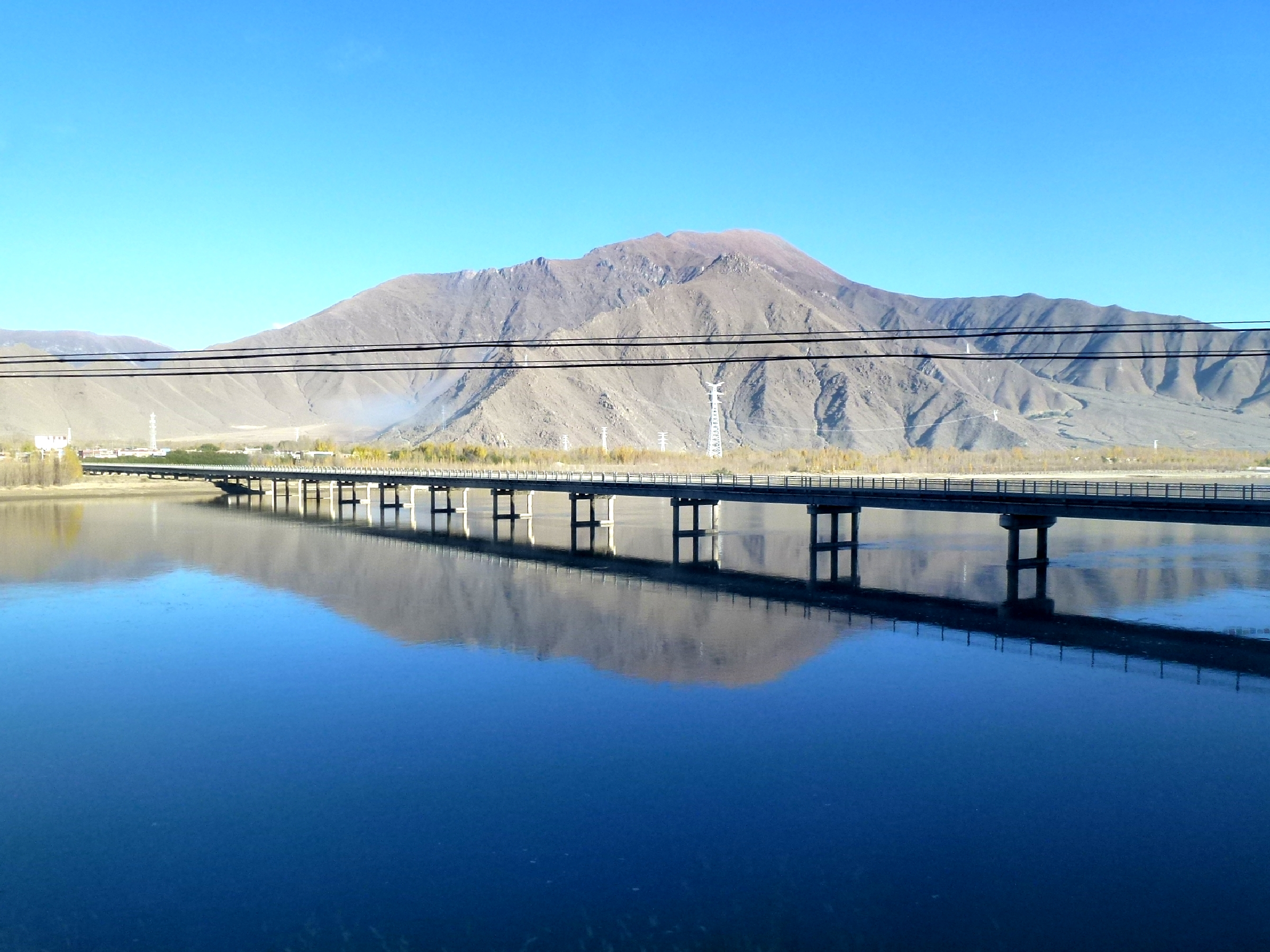
Qushui Yaluzangbujiang Bridge, the concrete bridge built by PRC replacing the Chushul Chakzam.

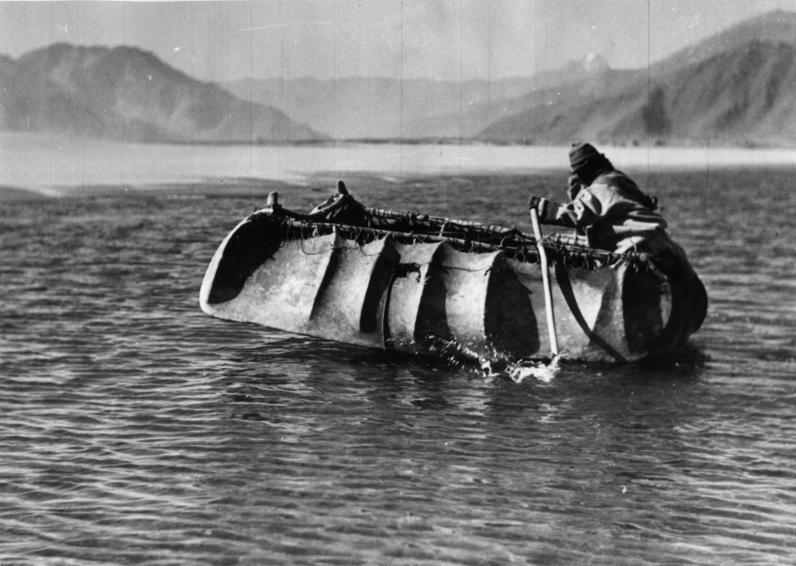
Ferry crossing in the 1930s

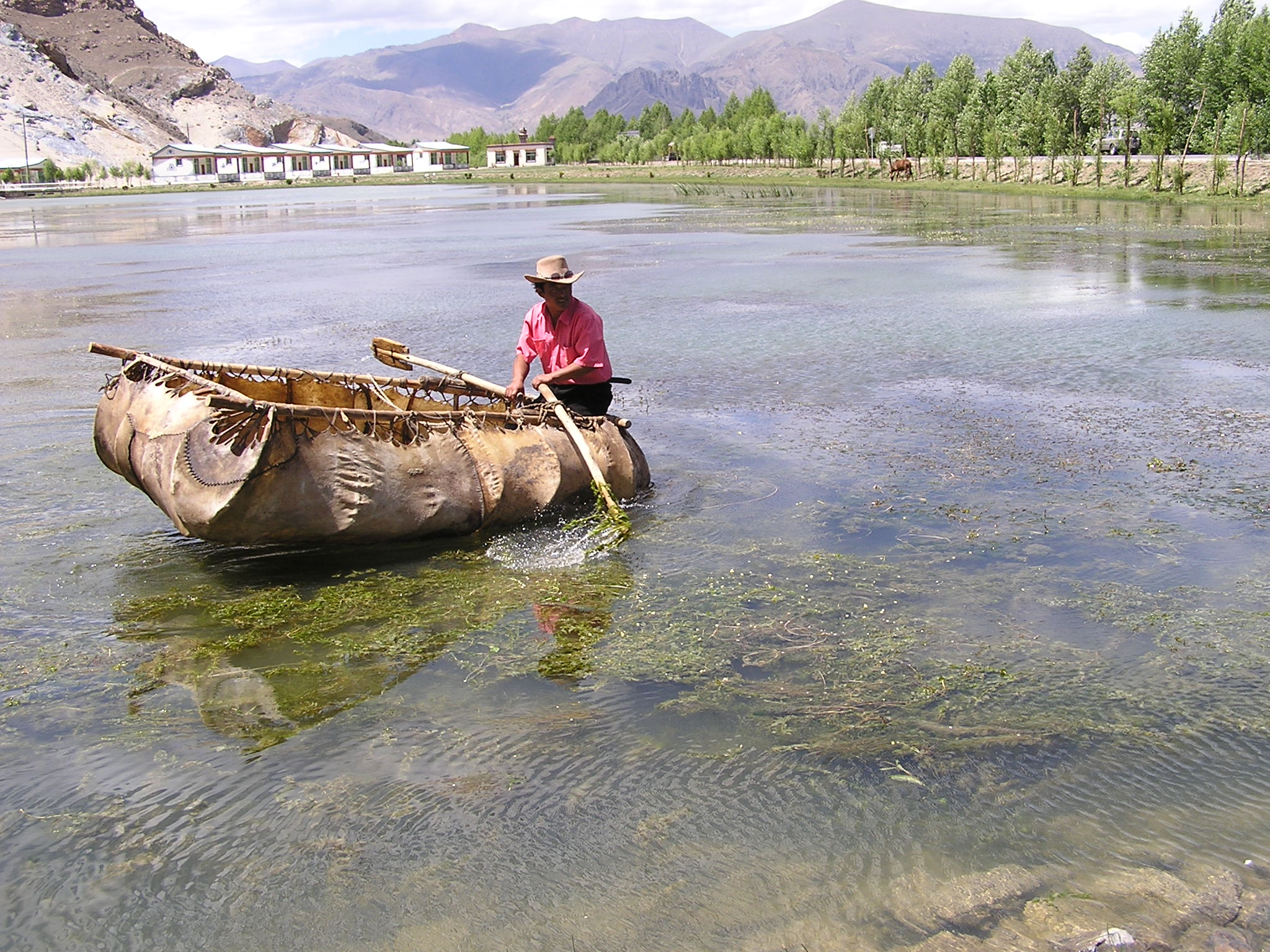
Modern recreational ferry

== See also ==
- List of bridges in China
