= Chung Riwoche =

Stupa in Ü-Tsang, Tibet

Religion
- Affiliation: Tibetan Buddhism

Location
- Location: Tibet
- Interactive map of Chung Riwoche
- Coordinates: 29°6′55.26″N 86°21′36″E

Architecture
- Founder: Thang Tong Gyalpo.
- Established: 14th century CE

Chung Riwoche (Tibetan: གཅུང་རི་བོ་ཆེ, Wylie: gcung ri-bo-che) is a large stupa of unusual design established in 1386 in the traditional Tibetan province of Ü-Tsang. It was later re-established and built by Mahasiddha Thangtong Gyalpo in 1436 Chung Riwoche is the seat of the Chakzampa (Thangtong Gyalpo) sub-lineage of the Shangpa Kagyu, and is still an active Kumbum with 9 monks as of 2014.
