= Jangtsa Dumtseg Lhakhang =

Dumtseg Lhakhang
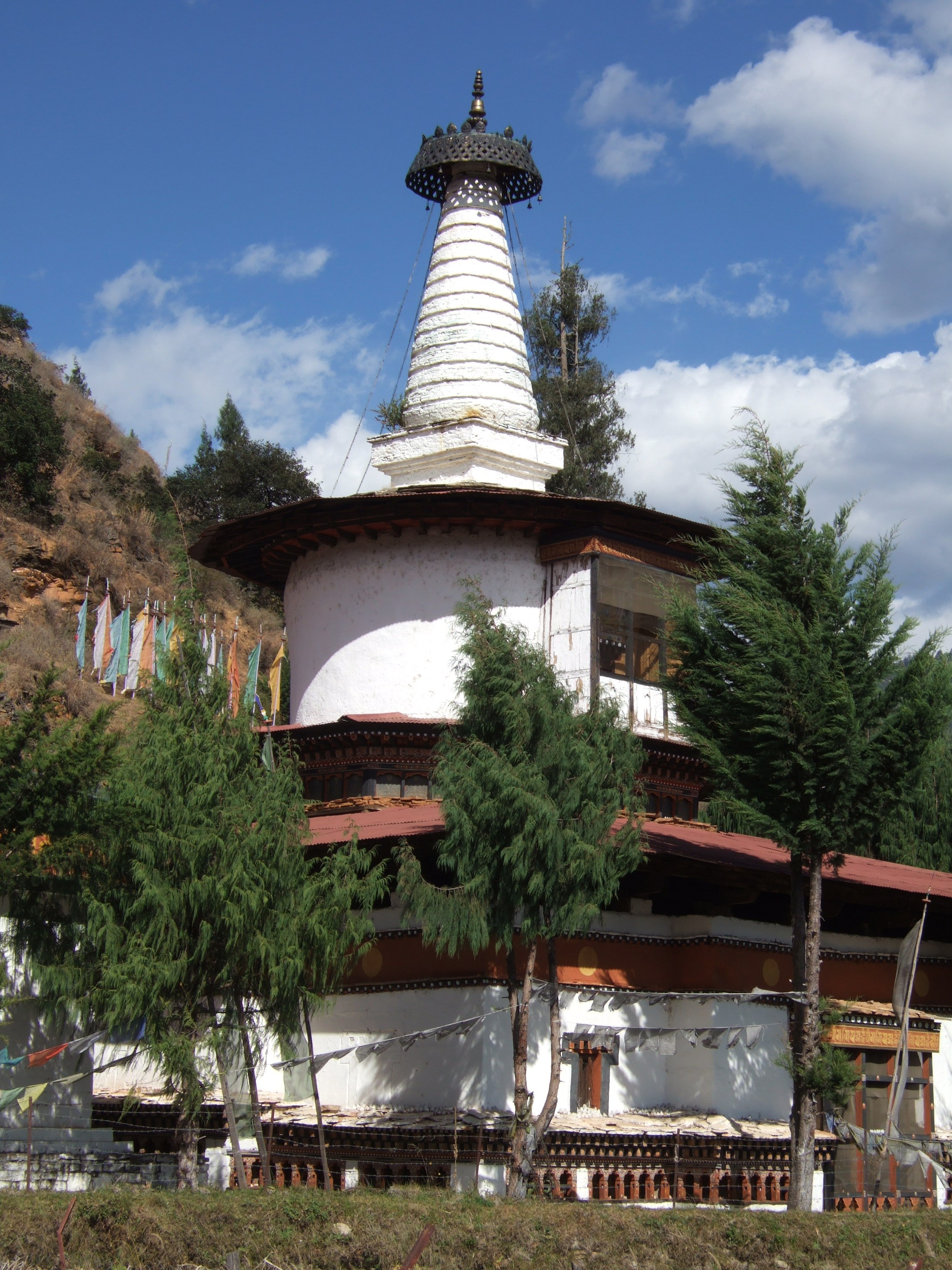
- Jangtsa Dumtseg Lhakhang

- Location within Bhutan

Religion
- Affiliation: Tibetan Buddhism

Location
- Location: Paro
- Country: Bhutan
- Interactive map of Dumtseg Lhakhang
- Coordinates: 27°26′6.45″N 89°24′49.09″E

Architecture
- Founder: Thangtong Gyalpo
- Established: 1433; 593 years ago

Jangtsa Dumtseg Lhakhang [zlum brtshegs lha khang] or Dungtse Lhakhang is a Buddhist temple in western Bhutan. The temple is notable as it is in the form of a chorten, very rare in Bhutan. It is located on the edge of a hill between the Paro valley and the Dopshari valley, across the bridge from Paro. The Buddhist iconography depicted in the Chorten is considered a unique repository of the Drukpa Kagyu school.

== Legend ==
According to a local legend, the Lhakhang was built by the saint Thangtong Gyalpo to subdue a "serpentine force" that was located at the foundation of the chorten. Another legend says that Lhakhang was built on the head of a demoness. According to a Bhutanese source it was built "on the nose of a hill that looks like a frog in order to counteract a Sadag (earth-owning spirit) and Lunyen (powerful naga spirit). It is said that the hill, by which the temple is built, is a black vicious snake moving downwards."

== Topography ==
The Lhakhang is located across the Paro Chhu River on the opposite bank of the Paro town where it forms a "geomantic promontory" between the Paro Chhu and Do rivers. It is situated on the road to National Museum of Bhutan in Paro.

== History ==
The stupa-temple was built in 1421 (other sources say 1433) by an eminent Tibetan lama named Thangtong Gyalpo (1385–1464), also known as Chagzampa, who is remembered for his building of some eight iron bridges in Bhutan. His reason for building a temple in chorten form is because it is said to immobilize demons and proclaim the victory of Buddhism.

In 1841, the 25th Je Khenpo, Sherab Gyeltsen restored the temple with the aid of local villagers, thanking the donors by carving their names on tree trunks which form the columns of the ground floor.

== Architecture ==
The Lhakhang is conceived as a mandala, with different storeys (three floors) corresponding to the different levels of initiation. The three floors are said to represent hell, earth and heaven. It is in the shape of a chorten with a white tower on top, very unusual in Bhutan. The monastery contains many steep ladders to reach the different levels. Lhakhang contains a massive collection of Buddhist paintings and iconography, said to rival those of any Tibetan Buddhist monastery. The ground floors holds the Five Buddhas of Meditation and forms of Avalokiteshvara, Guru Rinpoche and Thangton Gyelpo. On the second floor are depictions of Mahakala on the outer wall with hundred peaceful and wrathful deities and Bardo on the interior wall, the intermediary state between death and rebirth. On the third floor of Dungtse Lhakhang are Tantric deities. Depicted on the exterior wall are Guhyasamaja, Vajrabhairava, Cakrasamvara, Hevajra, Kalacakra, Vajravarahi, Hayagriva and Mahamaya. This is the five-deity mandala of the Shangpa school of Tibetan Buddhism, founded by Khyunpo Naljor. A renowned master of the Nyingma and Sakya schools, he was also a major contributor to the Shangpa Kagyu and his own line of teachings became known as the "Tong luk" or Tang Tong Gyalpo tradition of the Shangpa. On the inside wall are depictions of the 84 Indian saints and Tibetan saints such as Marpa, Milarepa (which has a majestic looking statue dedicated to him) and Gampopa.

Bhutan Postal Corporation Ltd., has issued a philatelic first day post card of the temple valued at Nu 10.

There is much older temple to the east of Jangtsa Dumtseg Lhakhang, known as the Jangtsa Palnang Lhakhang, which is said to be one of the 108 border taming [mtha' dul] temples built in the 7th century by the Tibetan Emperor Songtsen Gampo.

== Bibliography ==
- Pommaret, Francoise (2006). Bhutan Himalayan Mountains Kingdom (5th ed.). Odyssey Books and Guides.
- Thinley, Lopen Kunzang (2008). Wangdi, Pema (ed.). Seeds of Faith: A Comprehensive Guide to the Sacred Places of Bhutan. Vol. 1. Thimphu: KMT Publishers. ISBN 978-99936-22-42-0.
