= Zazê Township =

Coordinates: 30°6′N 86°25′E

Cazê (Chinese: 查孜; pinyin: Cházī) is a township in Ngamring County, Tibet Autonomous Region of China. It lies at an altitude of 4,787 metres (15,708 feet).

== See also ==
- List of towns and villages in Tibet
