= Derge Parkhang =

Chinese printing house

Coordinates: 31°48′22.60″N 98°34′51.56″E

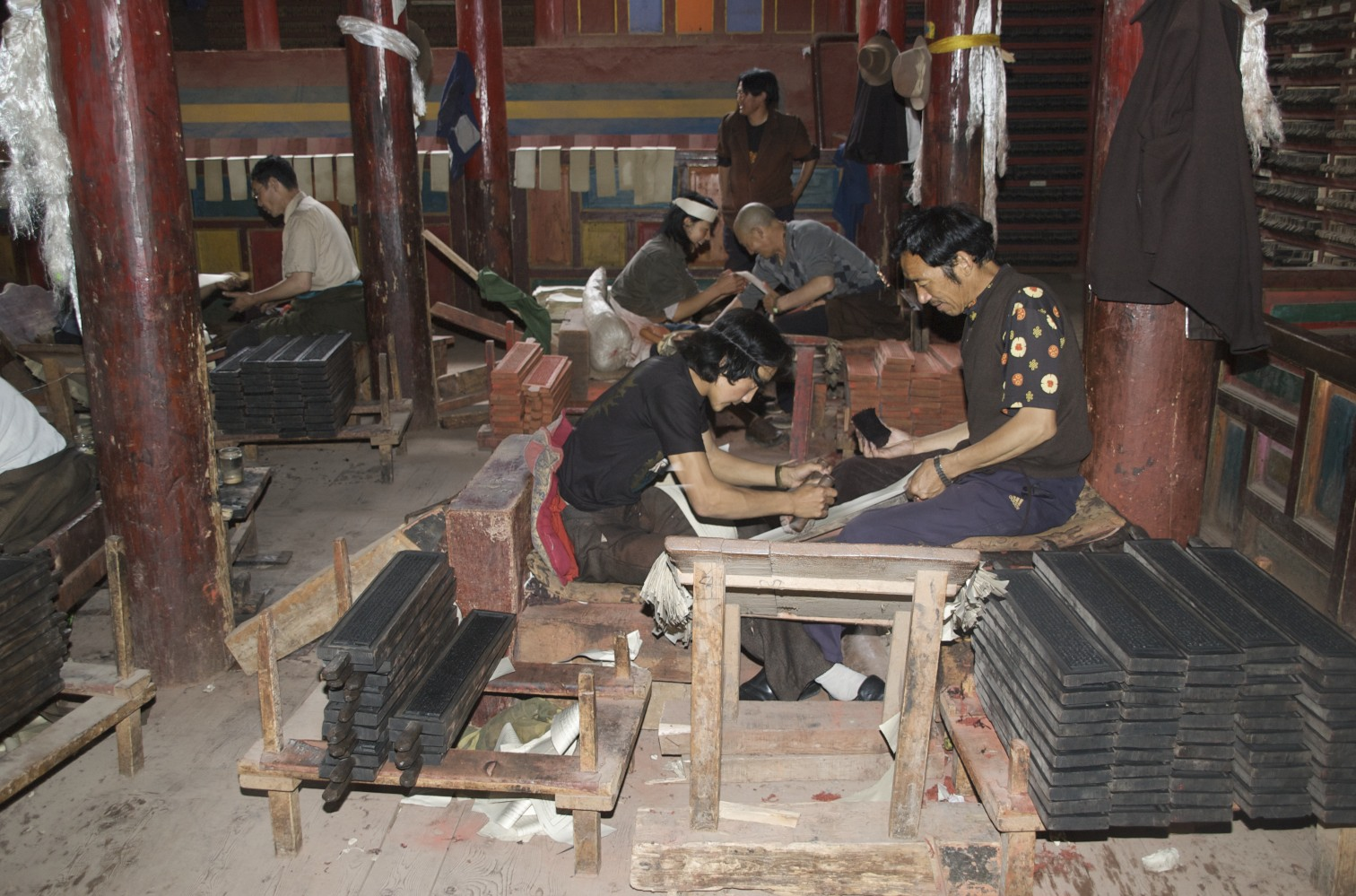
The famous printing house of Derge, Sichuan, China, photographed by Italian writer Mario Biondi in July 2009

The Dêrgê Barkang (pronunciation "Dehr-gheh", alternative names Derge Parkhang, Dege Parkhang, Derge Sutra Printing Temple, Dege Yinjing Yuan, Derge Barkhang, Dege Barkhang, Barkhang, Parkhang, Bakong Scripture Printing Press and Monastery; Tibetan: སྡེ་དགེ་པར་ཁང་, Wylie: sde dge par khang) is the barkang (printing house) associated to the Goinqên Monastery.

== Location and purpose ==
Derge is a county seat in a high valley in Kham, an eastern district of traditional Tibet which is now part of China's Sichuan Province. The Derge Parkhang is a living institution devoted to the printing and preservation of Tibetan literature, a printing temple that holds the greatest number of Tibetan woodblocks in the world.

== Cultural significance ==
The Derge Sutra Printing Temple (Parkhang in Tibetan) is one of the most important cultural, social, religious and historical institutions in Tibet; China has named it a National Protected Heritage Site. Founded in 1729 by Denba Tsering, the fortieth King of Derge (1678–1739) with the spiritual and literature assistance of the 8th Tai Situ Panchen Chokyi Jungne, the Derge Parkhang is an active center for publication of Tibetan Buddhist sutra, commentaries, and thangka as well as works of history, technology, biography, medicine and literature.

== Technique ==
Books are still being made in the same way as they have been for almost three hundred years: handprinted from hand-carved wooden blocks. Cinnabar is used to colour the text red, in which workers can print eight to fifteen pages manually a minute, 2500 in a day, from wooden blocks that have already been engraved with text. Thirty printers are in working condition where printers work in pairs, one puts ink on wooden press, later cleaned in a trough, while the other rolls a piece of paper using a roller which is imprinted red with sayings of Buddha.
