= Xungba Township, Ngamring County =

Xungba
- Township
- Location within Tibet
- Coordinates: 29°37′23″N 87°02′28″E
- Country: China
- Region: Tibet

Population
  - Total
  - Major Nationalities: Tibetan
  - Regional dialect: Tibetan language
- Time zone: +8

Xungba (Tibetan: གཞུང་བ་; Chinese: 雄巴; pinyin: Xióngbā) is a township in the Tibet Autonomous Region of China. The township falls under the jurisdiction of Ngamring County in Shigatse Prefecture.

== See also ==
- List of towns and villages in Tibet
