= Derge =

Derge 更庆镇
- Town
- Gengqing Town
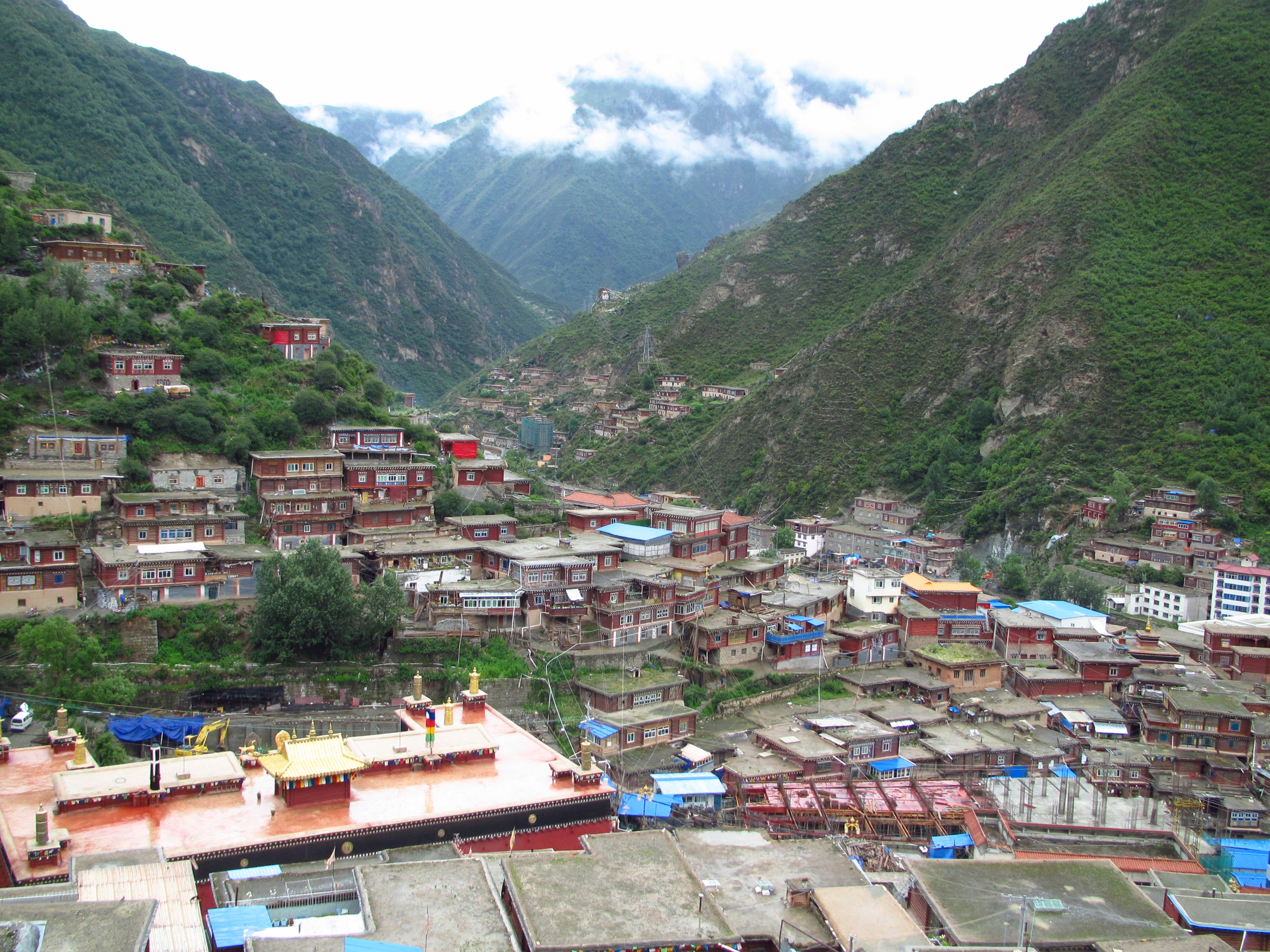
- View of Derge from above

- Location within Sichuan Location within China
- Coordinates: 31°48′29″N 98°34′43″E
- Country: China
- Province: Sichuan
- Prefecture: Garzê Tibetan Autonomous Prefecture
- County: Dêgê County

Area
  - Total: 431.6 km^{2} (166.6 sq mi)
- Elevation: 3,260 m (10,700 ft)

Population (2010)
  - Total: 10,221
- Time zone: UTC+8 (CST)

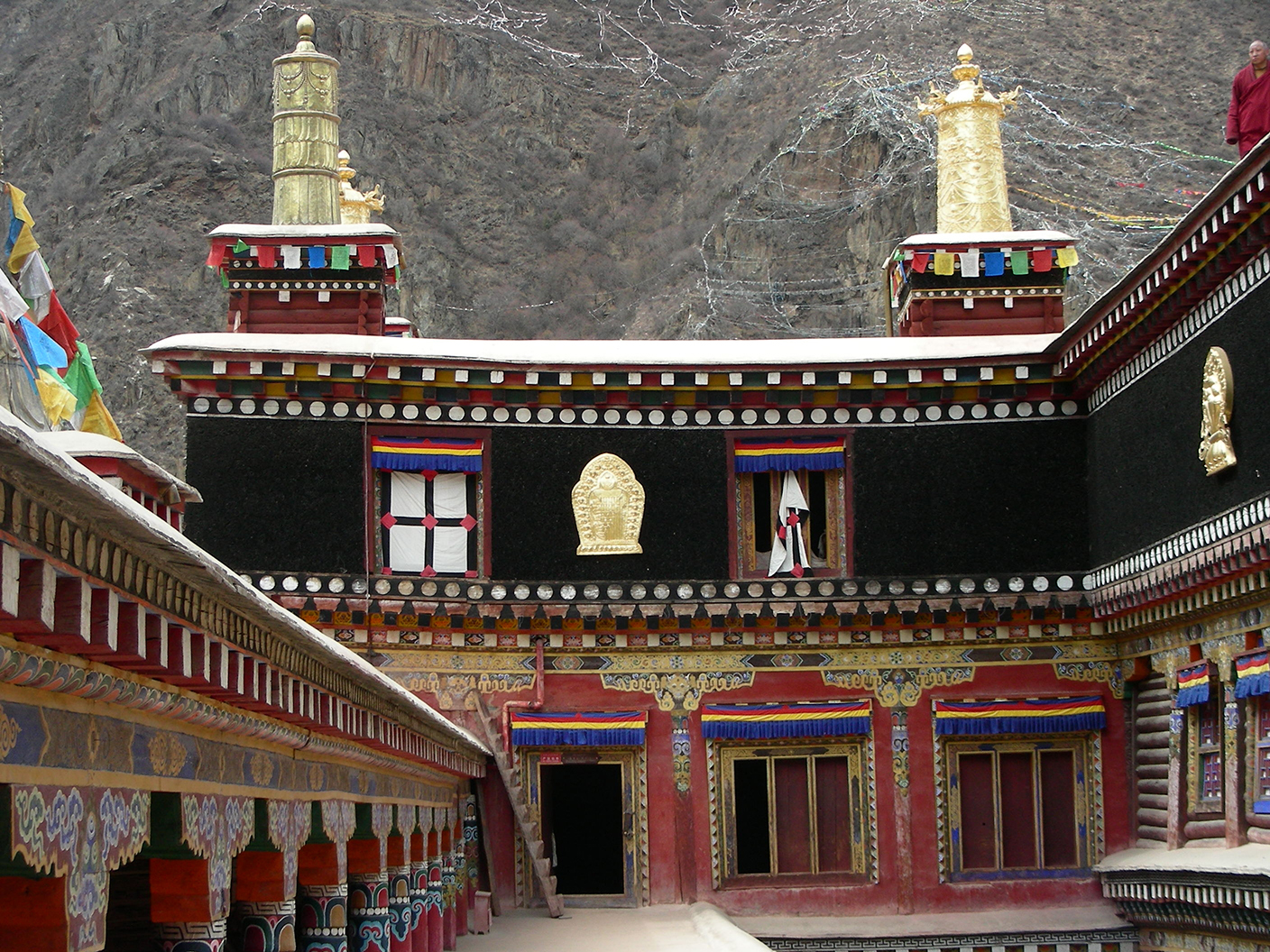
Parkhang, Derge, Kham in 2012

Derge (Tibetan: སྡེ་དགེ་, Wylie: sde dge), officially Gengqing Town (Tibetan: དགོན་ཆེན་ཀྲེན།, Wylie: dgon chen kren; Chinese: 更庆镇; pinyin: Gēngqìng Zhèn), is a town in Dêgê County in Garzê Tibetan Autonomous Prefecture in Sichuan, China. It was once the center of the Kingdom of Derge in Kham.

== History ==
Historically, Derge, which means "land of mercy", was an important centre of Tibetan culture, along with places such as Lhasa and Xiahe. Derge was formerly the seat of the kings of the kingdom of Derge, whose 1300-year lineage was broken with the death of the last male heir in the 1990s. The kingdom was an important industrial, religious and political center in Eastern Tibet. In the early 20th century, the kingdom fell into political struggle between the final heirs to the throne, Djembel Rinch'en and Doje Senkel. The latter, who had enjoyed the backing of the Chinese, yielded the kingdom to China in 1908 in exchange for the ousting of his rival. The palace of the Derge kings was torn down after 1950 and a school was later built on the site.

== Culture ==
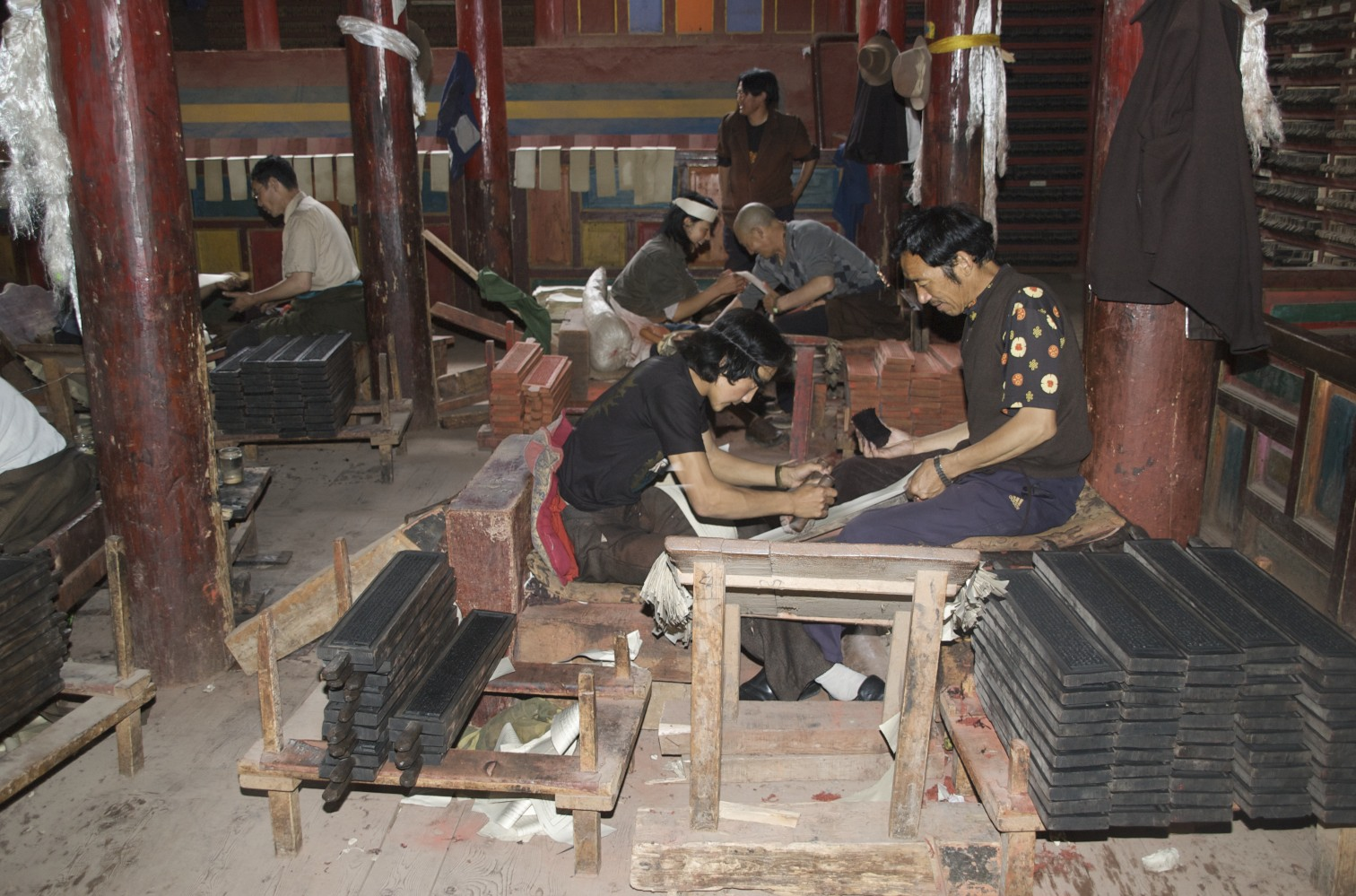
The renowned typography attached to Gonchen Monastery in Derge, Sichuan, China (photographed by Mario Biondi in July 2009)

The town of Derge is famous for its three-storey printing house, or parkhang, built in 1729, where the Kangyur, a collection of Buddhist scriptures, and the Tengyur, a collection of commentaries, are still printed from wooden blocks. It was established during the reign of Derge king Tenpa Tsering. Derge has produced artists such as the Situ Panchen, the 8th Tai Situpa who was a renowned Buddhist master who helped revive Tibetan culture and language, and aided King Tenpa Tsering in setting up the Derge Parkhang or Derge printing house. The printing house, which is administered by the Religious Affairs Bureau, continues to use its ancient techniques, and utilizes no machines in the printing process.

It has been estimated that the 217,000 blocks stored at Derge comprise 70% of the Tibetan literary heritage. The Derge editions are considered especially high quality, with few typographical errors.

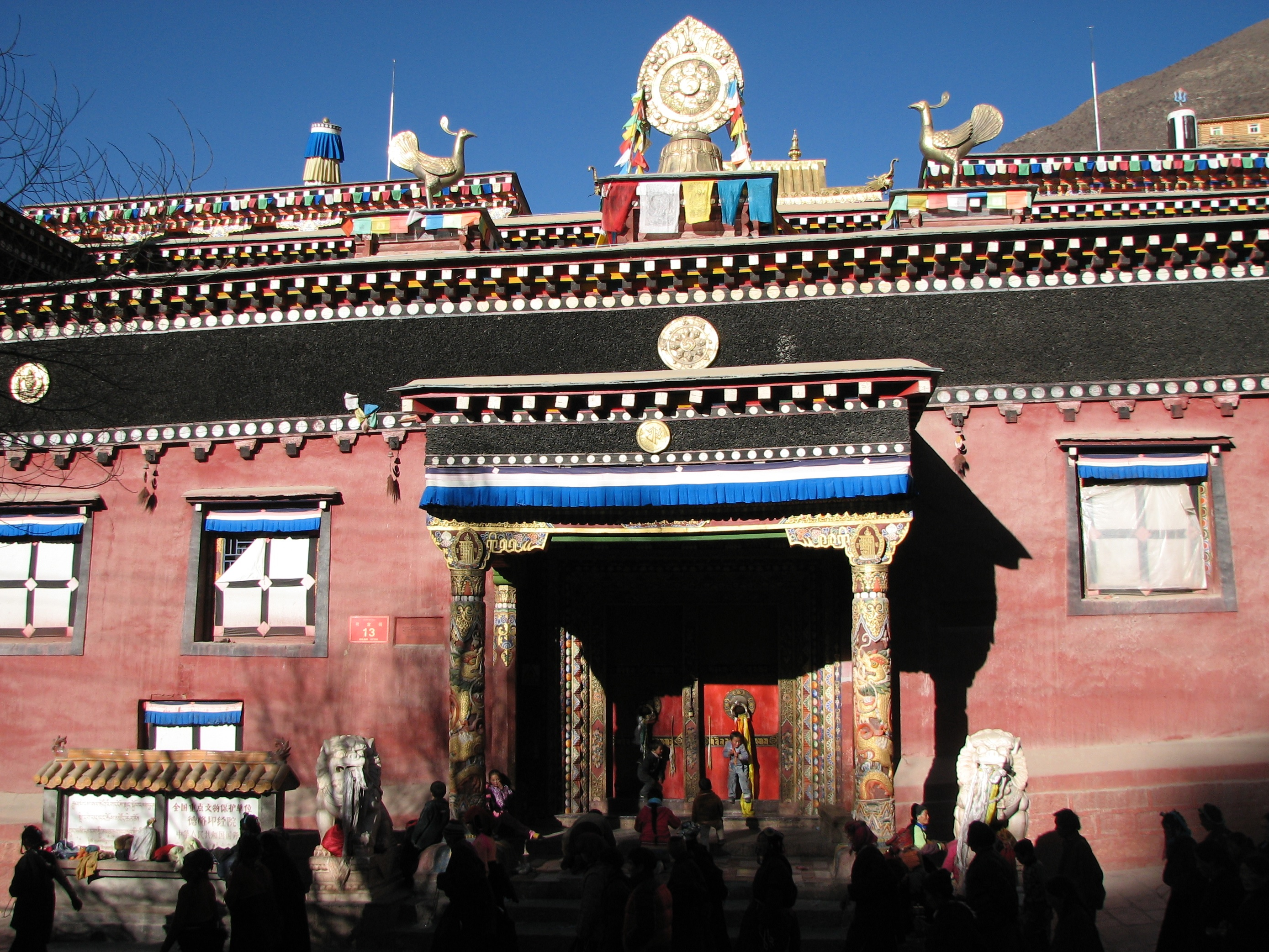
Derge printing house in 2015

Derge County contains several historic Tibetan monasteries, notably Palpung Monastery, Gongchen Monastery, Kathok Monastery, Palyul Monastery, Shechen Monastery and Dzogchen Monastery.
