= Mario Biondi (writer) =

Italian writer

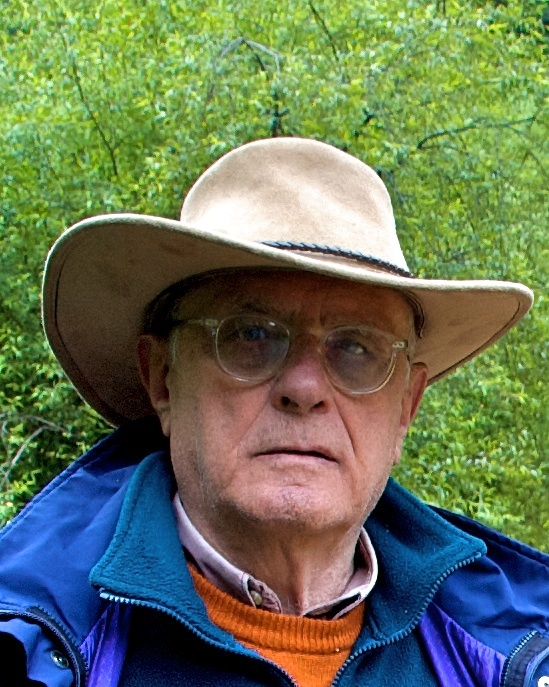
Italian writer Mario Biondi in Sichuan, China, July 2009

Mario Biondi (born 17 May 1939) is an Italian writer, poet, literary critic, journalist and translator. His reputation is mainly due to the novel Gli occhi di una donna, which earned him the important Italian award Premio Campiello in 1985. He has a keen interest in Central Asia and Tibetan history and culture, and in recent years has travelled all of the Silk Road through Turkey, Iran, Uzbekistan, Kyrgyzstan, Pakistan and many provinces of China, among which Gansu, Shaanxi, Sichuan, Qinghai and obviously Tibet.

== Biography ==
Born in Milan and grown up near Lake Como, he graduated from Bocconi University and then worked for sixteen years in publishing (Einaudi, Sansoni, Longanesi), as Chief Press Officer before becoming a freelance author. He has been constantly active in Anglo-American narrative, of which he is also a translator and reviewer for several dailies, weeklies and monthlies. He was a professional novelist for more than twenty years, and a publicist for more than thirty.

In 1973 he published a small collection of poems, Per rompere qualcosa, followed by other poems published on various literary publications or anthologies (Il Verri, Altri termini, Pianura etc.).

He has also published fourteen novels and, more recently, three books of travel memories (see detailed lists below).

Trivia: In the very first youth he also wore the Italian blue jersey of the junior and university teams of athletics, being included in the first prospective team for the Olympic Games in Rome, 1960, where he could not participate due to injury. In 1994 he was awarded the Literary Prize of CONI, Comitato Olimpico Nazionale Italiano.

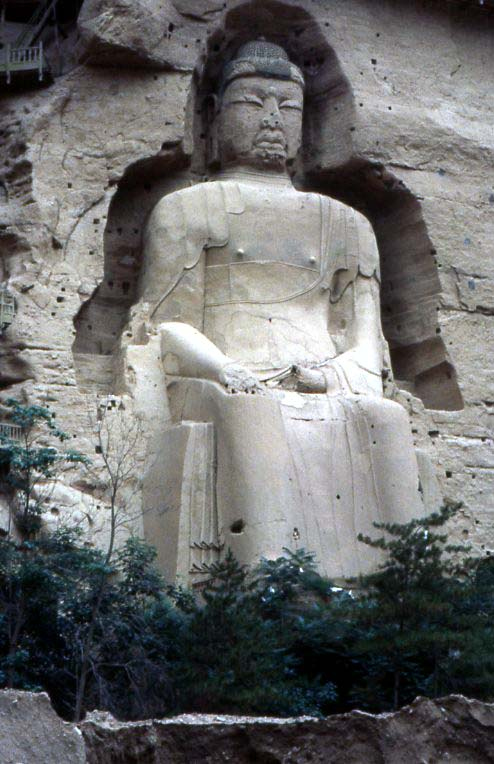
The giant Buddha (26 m) in Bingling-Si, on the Yellow River, Gansu, China

== Travels ==
Biondi has begun his travels in 1968, and in 2003 he has collected his memories in his first book of travels Güle Gule. Parti con un sorriso. 35 years of voyages from New York City to Iran, through Algeria, Albania, Syria, Jordan, Turkey, Egypt. In 2004 he realized that he had unknowingly travelled most of the Silk Road, so he completed the route crossing Turkmenistan, Uzbekistan and Kyrgyzstan, reaching China at Kashgar through the Tien Shan (Mountains of Heaven) and from there crossing the Taklamakan Desert to Turpan (Caves of the Thousand Buddhas, Bezeklik). And in 2005 he collected his new memories in his second book of travels, Strada bianca per i Monti del Cielo.

Between 2005 and 2007, Biondi has also completed "philologically" the Silk Road to its eastern end, represented by the ancient Chinese capitals Xi'an and Luoyang, proceeding from there to Beijing, Shanghai and Lhasa (with the famous Qingzang Railway from Xining, Qinghai). But above all visiting, in addition to Tibet, large areas of other Tibetan Autonomous Regions in Gansu (the monasteries of the Gelugpas (Yellow Hats) in Labrang and Langmu-Si, the famous Buddha caves of Bingling-Si on the Yellow River), in Qinghai (Gelugpa complex of Kumbum, the birthplace of Tsongkhapa, monasteries of Rebkong/Tongren etc.) and in Sichuan (Great Buddha of Leshan and Mount Emei).

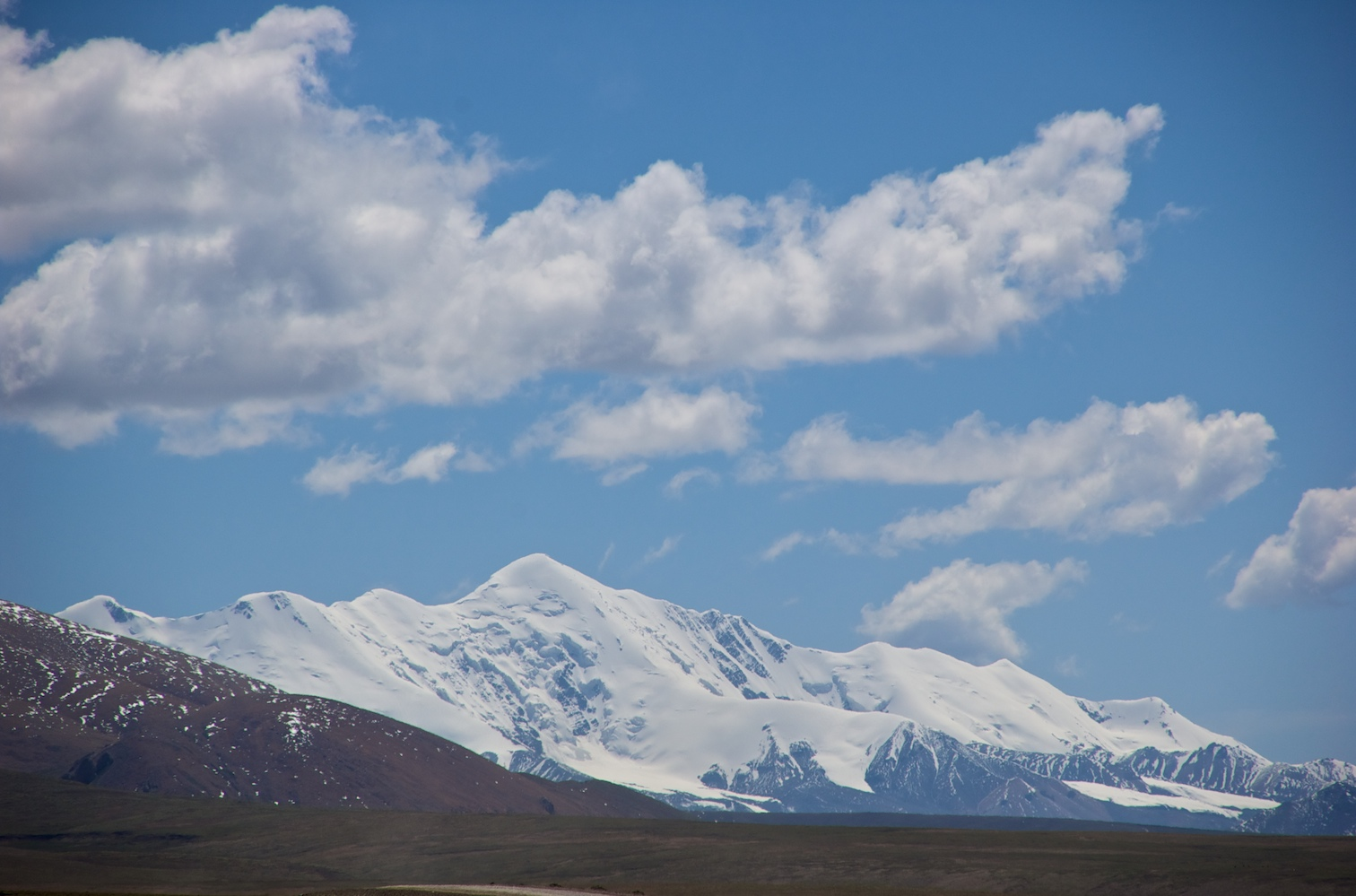
Amne Machin, the second sacred mountain for Tibetans (Maqen Gangri, 6282 m, Qinghai, China)

From these complex experiences was born in 2008 his third book of travels, Con il Buddha di Alessando Magno, long and passionate journey along the paths of the Art of Gandhara, that's to say the syncretism of the preaching of Buddha and the Hellenistic culture brought by Alexander to the Indus. A syncretism that has extended its influence to the Far East. In 2008, still in China, he has visited Ningxia, the autonomous province of the Muslim Hui, but especially, again, Qinghai, divided in the two large territories of Amdo and part of Kham (Yushu-Jyekundo), respectively inhabited by Tibetans Amdowas and Khampas. In 2009 he has continued the exploration of said territories, reaching in 2010 Mount Kailash, Lake Manasarovar and the remains of the ancient Kingdom of Guge, in Western Tibet. From there Biondi's travels continued to some Holy Festivals of Bhutan (Tsechu and Drupchhoe) and Nepal (Indra Jatra).

== Works ==
=== Poetry ===
- 1968 Conclusioni di Orfeo (In Marcatré n. 37/38/39/40)
- 1973 Per rompere qualcosa (Volume, Ant. Ed)
- 1973 Settecento Watt (In Altri Termini)
- 1974 Jazzparola Suite (In Pianura. Poesia e Prosa degli Anni Settanta. A cura di S. Vassalli. Ant. Ed)
- 1976 Dissonanza. Poesie d'amore (In Il Verri, Sesta serie, n. 2, settembre)
- 1976 Varie parole civili. Nove poesie (In Almanacco dello Specchio Mondadori n. 5)
- 1977 Nuova ballata per Newyorkville n. 200 (In North n. 5/6, marzo)
- 1980 Trittico (Translated in English on Altro Polo, Italian Poetry today. Editor R. Perrotta, Sydney)
- Poems by Mario Biondi are out of print and can be read (in Italian) only on the relevant page of his Web Site

=== Novels ===
- 1975 Il lupo bambino (Marsilio)
- 1981 La sera del giorno (Bompiani)
- 1982 Il cielo della mezzaluna (Longanesi)
- 1985 Gli occhi di una donna (id., Premio Campiello)
- 1986 La civetta sul comò (id.)
- 1988 Un amore innocente (Rizzoli)
- 1990 Crudele amore (id.)
- 1992 Il destino di un uomo (id.)
- 1993 Due bellissime signore (id.)
- 1995 Un giorno e per tutta la vita (id.)
- 1998 Una porta di luce (Longanesi)
- 1999 Codice Ombra (Longanesi)
- 2006 Destino (TEA)
- 2012 La Casa delle Mille e Una Notte (Barbera)
- 2015 Rosa d'Oriente (ebook Kindle)

=== Books of travels ===
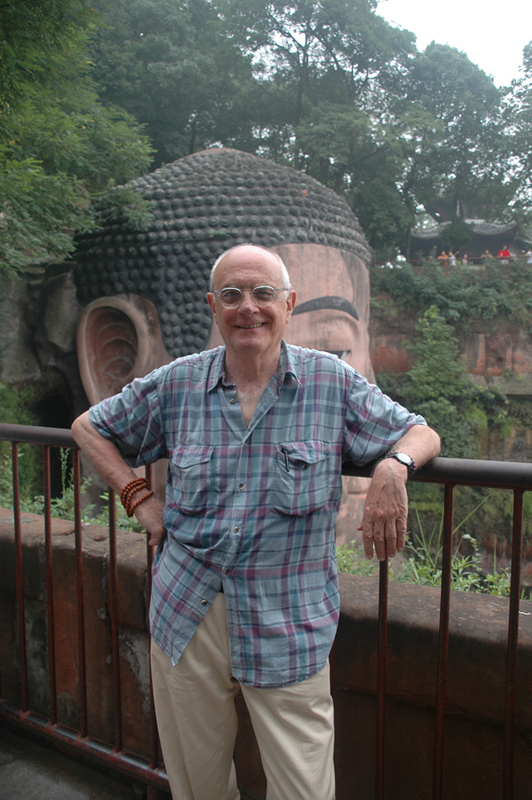
Mario Biondi at the huge 71-metre Buddha in Leshan, Sichuan, China, July 2006 (Selfportrait)

- 2003 Güle güle. Parti con un sorriso (Ponte alle Grazie)
- 2005 Strada bianca per i Monti del Cielo. Vagabondo sulla Via della Seta (id.)
- 2008 Con il Buddha di Alessandro Magno. Dall'ellenismo sull'Indo ai misteri del Tibet (id.)

=== Translations ===
He has translated 71 works mostly by American and English authors, including Bernard Malamud, John Updike, Edith Wharton, Anne Tyler, Peter Carey and Nobels Isaac Bashevis Singer, William Golding, Wole Soyinka and Orhan Pamuk (from the American edition of Kara Kitab - The Black Book as expressly requested by Pamuk to his first Italian publisher, Frassinelli).

- See the complete list of the 71 translations by M. Biondi

== Activity in Internet ==
Mario Biondi has always had a keen interest in technology and its future expectations, as evidenced by the novels Una porta di luce (1998) and Codice Ombra (1999). Logical consequence, his interest in the Internet. Connected to a network from mid-1994, in April 1995 he created his Web site, first Italian writer to do so and perhaps also in Europe (they were still very few even in the USA). A site of service, which apart from providing information about the writer and his work - including the possibility of downloading narratives and critics -, offers some databases for the analysis of text in a variety of classics: the Aeneid (in Latin), the Bible, the Divine Comedy, Jerusalem Delivered, Orlando furioso, The Betrothed (all in Italian). Using his knowledge of the world of Opera, Biondi has also created and posted on his site a powerful (and very used) Database of Opera.

== Photography ==
A semi-professional hobby, strictly connected to the passion for travel that has always animated Biondi, who has posted on the Net many more than 5000 photos taken since 1968 in Italy - Algeria - Turkey - United States - Cuba - Syria - Yugoslavia - Albania - Iran - Uzbekistan - Kyrgyzstan - Pakistan - China - Nepal - Bhutan, freely visible in the proper spaces on his Web Site.

== Opera ==
Biondi has always cultivated a deep interest in Opera, and over the years has accumulated thousands of recordings, creating a simple but very informed Database of Opera with data about more than 1700 titles of operas by some 600 composers in more than 5000 recordings. (Who has directed, who played, who has sung (and with whom), when, where, how ... The Database of Opera, searchable via a simple form, is freely accessible through the specific page of his Web Site.

== Bibliography ==
- Dizionario Bompiani degli Autori. Milan: Bompiani. 1987.
- Enciclopedia della Letteratura Garzanti. Milan: Garzanti. 2007.
- Asor Rosa, Alberto, ed. (1992). Dizionario della letteratura italiana del Novecento. Turin: Einaudi.
- Enciclopedia Rizzoli Larousse. Milan: Rizzoli.
- OMNIA - Enciclopedia Multimediale. De Agostini.
- Porta, Antonio (1976). (Introduzione alle poesie di Biondi), Almanacco dello Specchio n.5. Milan: Mondadori. p. 233.
- De Michelis, Cesare (1990). Fiori di Carta. La nuova narrativa italiana. Milan: Bompiani. p. 37.
