= Economy of Tibet =

The economy of Tibet is dominated by subsistence agriculture. Due to limited arable land, livestock raising is the primary occupation mainly on the Tibetan Plateau, among them are sheep, cattle, goats, camels, yaks, donkeys and horses. The main crops grown are barley, wheat, buckwheat, rye, potatoes, oats, rapeseeds, cotton and assorted fruits and vegetables. In recent years the economy has begun evolving into a multiple structure with agriculture and tertiary industry developing side by side.

== Context ==
Tibetologist Andrew Martin Fischer states that, according to a Chinese census of 2000, Tibetans remain predominantly rural, with an overall rural Tibetan resident rate of 87.2%, including 91.4% in Qinghai, 90.9% in Gansu, 89.5% in Sichuan, 84.8% in the Tibet Autonomous Region, and 80% in Yunnan. Due to the scarcity of arable land, livestock herding is the primary occupation on the Tibetan Plateau.

According to the Illustrated White Paper published by the central government in 2009 on the occasion of the 50th anniversary of the Democratic Reform in Tibet, a modern industry with Tibetan characteristics has developed, with mining, construction materials, handicrafts, and Tibetan medicine as its pillars, and electricity production, processing of agricultural and livestock products, and food production as auxiliary sectors. Modern commerce, tourism, catering, leisure, and other industries, unknown under the old regime, were booming and constituted the primary industries of the region. From 2001 to 2009, Beijing invested 45.4 billion dollars in the economic development of the Tibet Autonomous Region. This has had beneficial effects on economic growth, living standards, and infrastructure.

Andrew Martin Fischer states that the discourse on growth does not mention the "context of continued political disempowerment of Tibetans," where massive subsidy strategies directly serve the government or Chinese companies based outside Tibetan sectors. This situation enables the appropriation of the local economy by non-Tibetan populations, despite the significance of the subsidies. Fischer notes that the majority of construction projects are awarded to companies outside Tibet, which primarily employ Han Chinese workers. These companies reinvest their profits in their home provinces rather than in Tibet's economy. Sinologist Jean-Luc Domenach considers that "while Tibetans have partially regained control over their religious practices and customs, they have hardly strengthened their economic and social influence. Meanwhile, with economic development, Chinese settlers have arrived in increasing numbers, while the idea that Tibet is merely a charming tourist curiosity has spread in Chinese cities".

== Geography ==
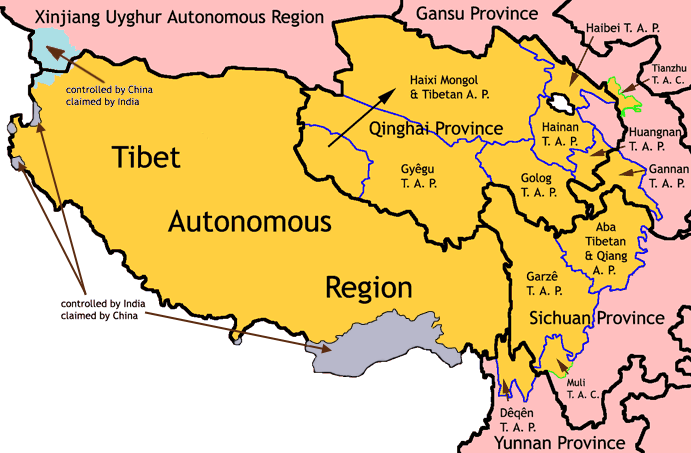
The autonomous Tibetan administrative subdivision of the People's Republic of China.

Tibet is a historic country in Asia, consisting of three Tibetan provinces: Kham, Ü-Tsang, and Amdo. Today, it mainly comprises the autonomous Tibetan administrative subdivisions of the People's Republic of China, including the Tibet Autonomous Region.

Tibet consists mainly of a high plateau, the Tibetan Plateau, surrounded on three sides by the world's highest mountain ranges: the Himalayas to the south, the Karakoram to the west, and the Kunlun Mountains to the north. Often referred to as “the Roof of the World,” Tibet has an average altitude of 5,000 meters, and its highest peak, Mount Everest, rises to 8,849 meters.

The Tibet Autonomous Region covers 1,200,000 km^{2}. The northern plateau (Changtang) comprises high-altitude regions, the central plateau around Lhasa comprises major agricultural regions, and the southeastern plateau (land of gorges) has significant forest resources, being China's second largest forest biomass zone. The majority of Tibetans live in agricultural areas, which account for 2% of the region's total area. There are approximately 500,000 nomadic herders in Tibet. The Tibet Autonomous Region is rich in minerals, some of which are rare in other parts of China. Its chromium and copper deposits are the largest in the country. Tibet has the world's largest borax and uranium deposits and half of the world's lithium reserves. In order to increase mining activities in the northeast and west of the Tibet Autonomous Region, the latter has been classified as a special economic zone. The Tibet Autonomous Region has the largest hydroelectric potential in Asia. Tibet has a rich cultural and ecological heritage, and national parks have been created, including the Changthang Wildlife Sanctuary in 1992.

== History ==
=== 17th and 18th centuries ===
==== Currency and commerce ====
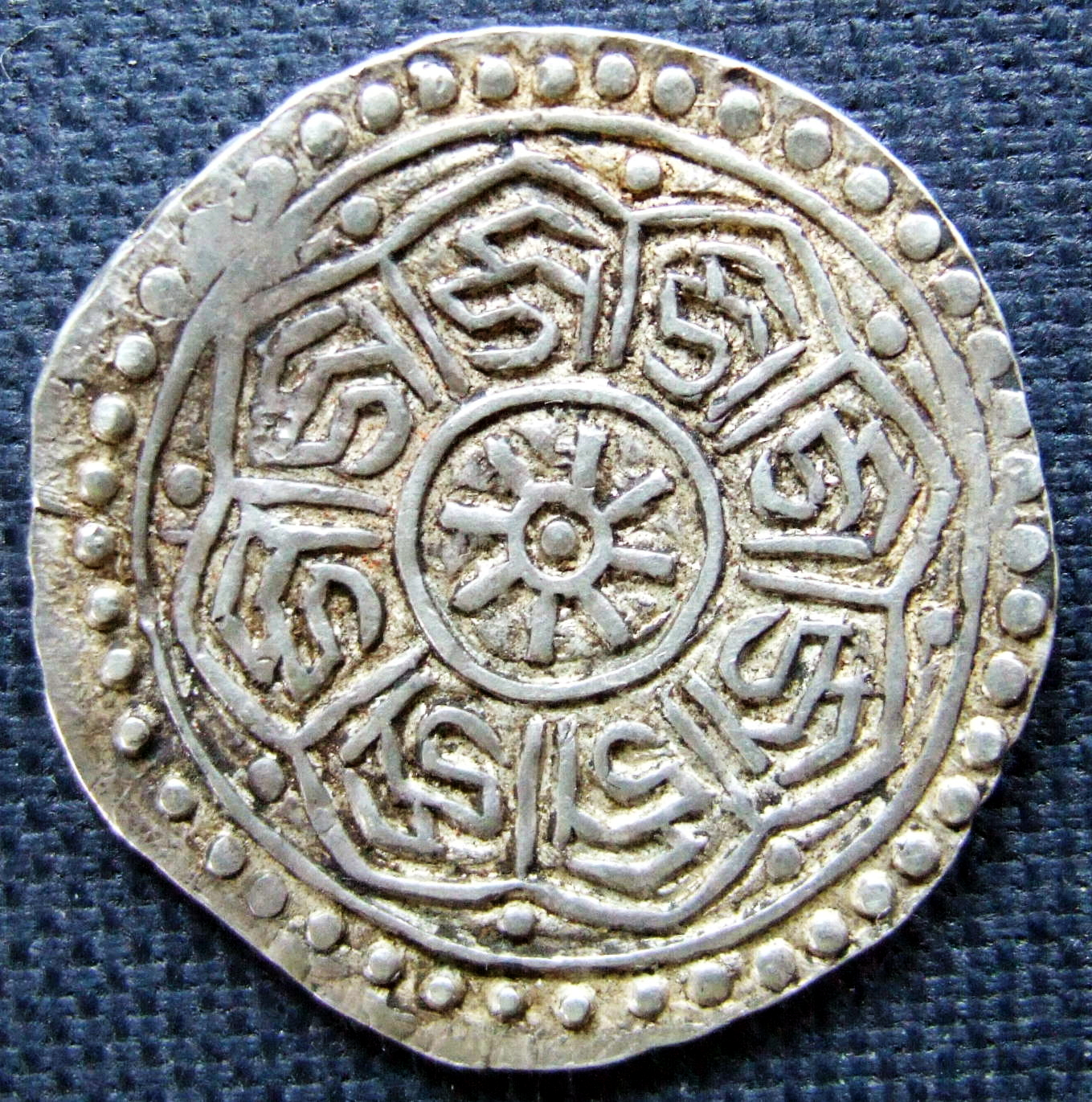
Coin from the 18th century.

Like the Nepalese and the Chinese, Tibetans did not use gold for their currency, unlike Europeans. In 1650, the 5th Dalai Lama signed a treaty with the king of Patan, Siddhi Narasimha Malla, allowing Nepal to mint currency using silver ingots supplied by the Tibetans. The Malla kings received a 12% commission. This currency was used in Tibet until 1792, when the Tibetan government began minting its own currency.

Trade was one of the main activities alongside agriculture and animal husbandry. At the time, Tibet was largely open to the outside world exporting numerous products, except during periods of turmoil. Possessing salt lakes, Tibet used to export salt to India and it sold animals, horses, gold, wool, carpets, incense, musk, salt and animal hides to China. To India and Nepal, it exported iron from the Kutti region, paper from Dakpo, and quartz from Yarlung.

The country imported large quantities of tea, musical instruments, porcelain, and grains from China. Although itself a producer of silk, Tibet also imported silk for the manufacture of clothing and khatas.

==== Agriculture and livestock farming ====
Fields were located in the valleys and on the lower slopes of the mountains. Barley, cultivated up to 4,500 meters, was the primary crop. Wheat, buckwheat, maize, turnips, radishes, beans, and also rice were grown in the valleys. Due to the climate, only one harvest per year was possible. Farmers often owned a few animals, such as the dzo. Missionaries reported that vineyards of white grapes, located in Kham, south of Lhasa, and in Batang, enabled them to produce wine for masses.

Nomadic herders raised horses, goats, yaks, sheep and dzo. They used one campsite in summer and another at higher altitude in winter. Sheep provided meat highly valued by Tibetans. Pig farming was associated with poultry farming. Animal slaughter took place in autumn when the animals were fattest. When possible, herders had animals slaughtered by someone else to avoid the demerit of killing a living being. Amdo and Kongpo were renowned for horse breeding.

Despite Buddhist precepts, Tibetans hunted for economic reasons. They hunted for the meat of wild yaks and for the fur of snow leopards, wolves, foxes, otters, and other animals. When necessary, they killed predators of their herds, which also allowed them to sell the fur, hides, or musk of these animals. In Amdo, ritual hunts targeting deer and wild sheep were organized. These hunts had no significant impact on wildlife conservation due to the vastness of the Tibetan territory, the very low population density, and the rudimentary weapons used (bows, spears, knives, etc.).

==== Mining operations ====
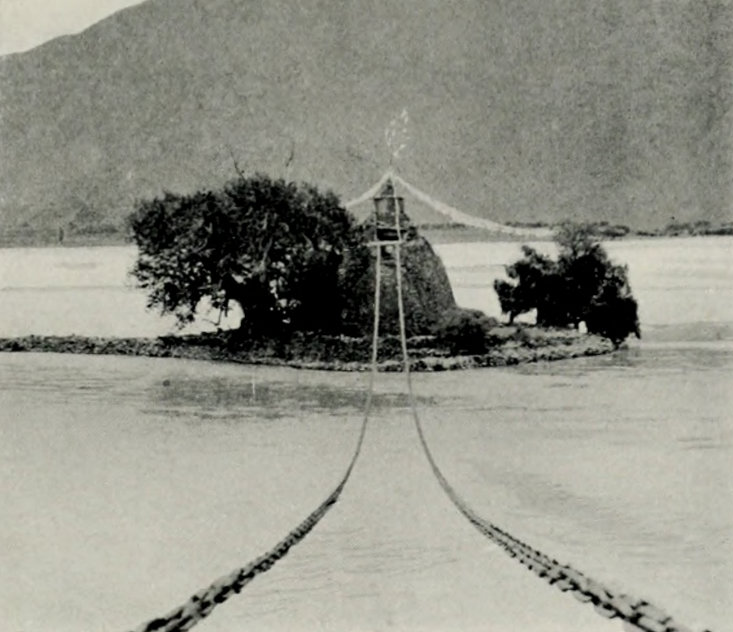
Old Chain-Bridge at Chaksam, built in 1430 by Thang Tong Gyalpo

Tibetans developed mines despite religious precepts that hindered such exploitation. Thus, in the 15th century, Thang Tong Gyalpo obtained iron from the mines of Kongpo, enabling the construction of suspension bridges with steel chains (Tibetans built chain bridges as early as the sixth century). Similarly, in 1445, Chökyi Drönma, princess of Gungthang, traveled to this region to acquire a large quantity of iron. Mines of copper, borax, sulfuric acid, rock salt, iron, and gold were reported by the missionary Francesco della Penna. These mines were located in central Tibet, Dakpo, Kham, and Kongpo. The explorer Samuel Turner mentioned mines of gold, lead, and cinnabar. Tibet was then renowned for its wealth in gold, which came from gold prospecting and mines. Furthermore, the export of gold was permitted by Tibetan authorities.

=== 19th century to the 1950s ===
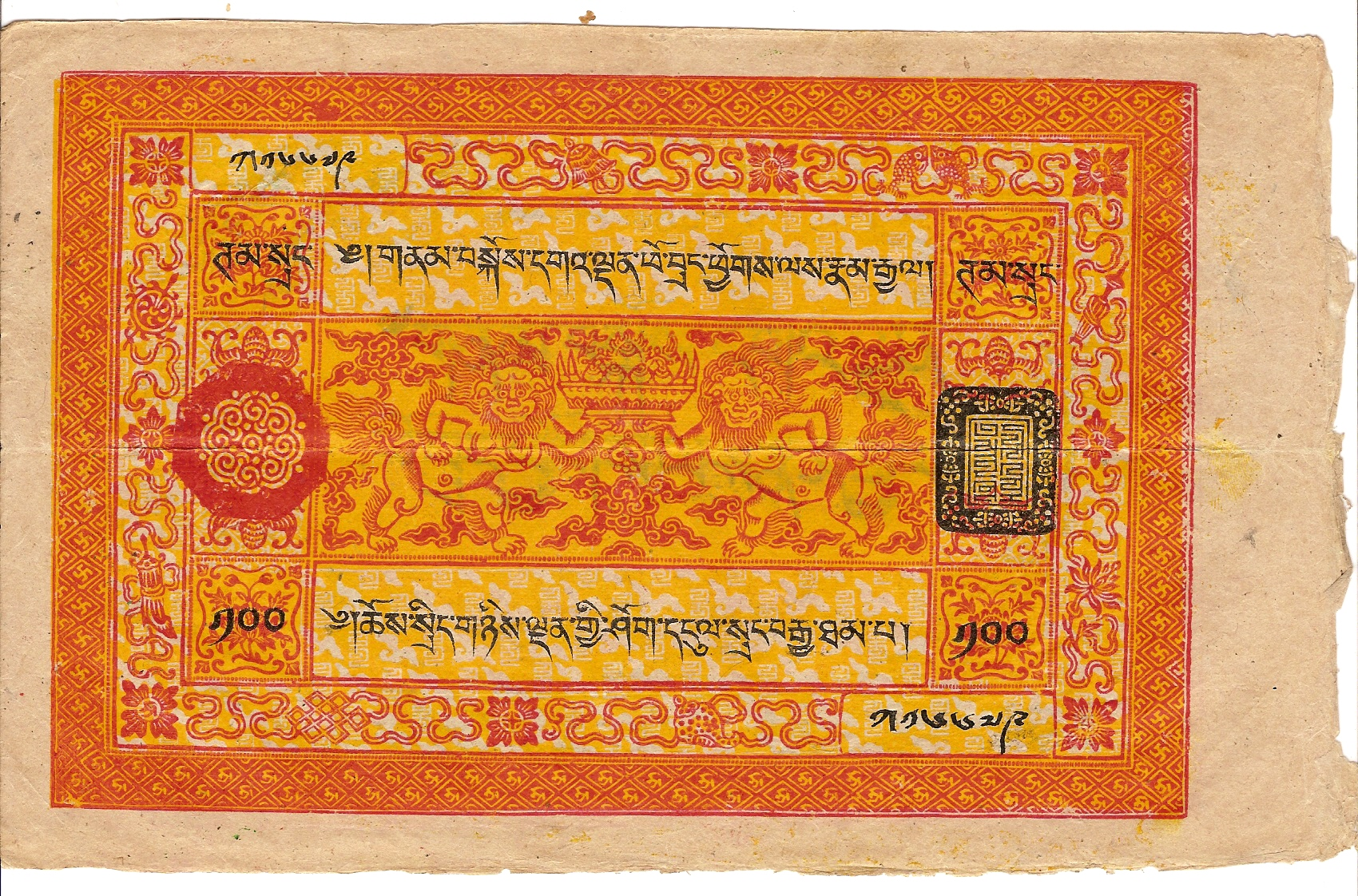
A Tibetan banknote worth 100 tam srang (front).

At the end of the 19th century, the Japanese visitor Ekai Kawaguchi noted that trade in Lhasa was active, as markets sold goods from China and India. Payments were made in gold, which was weighed in Indian rupees, or using Tibetan currency. Monks held a monopoly on the trade of tea and religious images while Chinese merchants operated numerous restaurants.

Heinrich Harrer, who resided in Lhasa from 1946 to 1951, wrote in his book Seven Years in Tibet that coins were made of gold, silver, or copper. They bore Tibetan emblems: the snow lion and mountain, also depicted on the national flag alongside the rising sun.

According to the Chinese government, apart from a 92-kilowatt power plant in Lhasa, a small armaments factory and a small mint established by the 13th Dalai Lama, there was no industry in old Tibet.

According to Li Sha from Shenyang University, there was, in Lhasa, south of the Jokhang Temple, a beggars’ village called Lu Bu Band Cang, and these beggars gathered around the Ramoche Temple. In 1951, there were between 3,000 and 4,000 beggars, representing about one-tenth of the city's population.

In 1947, the Kashag sent a Tibetan delegation led by Tsepon W. D. Shakabpa as Tibet's finance minister to the United States, among other places, for trade negotiations. He also received a visa on his passport in 1947 for trade purposes and traveled to China, India, England, the United States, Italy, Switzerland, and France. Surkhang Lhawang Topgyal participated as an interpreter in the trade delegation. The economic objective of the mission was to introduce machinery for agriculture and livestock farming in Tibet, as well as for wool processing, and to secure the relaxation of Indian control over Tibet's exports and the purchase of gold for Tibetan currency. Politically, the mission aimed to emphasize Tibet's independence abroad, as information about Tibet at the time was primarily sourced from Chinese accounts. According to Thubten Samphel, a spokesperson for the Dalai Lama and representative of the Tibetan government in exile, “This indicates that wherever Tsepon W. D. Shakabpa traveled, the passport issued by the Tibetan government was recognized.”

=== Democratic reforms (1959–1969) ===
Following the failure of the 1959 Tibetan uprising (referred to as the "armed rebellion" in Chinese historiography) and the exile of part of the population, the Chinese government declared that it was no longer obligated to delay reforms, as the 17-Point Agreement for the Peaceful Liberation of Tibet of 1951 had been breached. It decreed and implemented what it calls the "democratic reforms".

According to Jiawei Wang and Nyima Gyaincain, in May 1959, the central government approved the democratic reforms prepared by the Tibet Work Committee. These were carried out in two stages:

- The first stage focused on abolishing compulsory corvée (ulag) and slavery, as well as reducing rents and loan interest rates.
- The second stage concentrated on land distribution.

The goal was the elimination of the feudal system. Owners of large estates who did not participate in the revolt had their properties purchased by the state, while others were expropriated.

=== The cultural revolution (1966–1976) ===
During the decade ending in 1975, the organization of people's communes was gradually established in most rural areas of the Tibet Autonomous Region.

During the Cultural Revolution, industrial production and economic activity in the Tibet Autonomous Region and the rest of China experienced a decline or even came to a halt. The situation began to change following the arrest of the Gang of Four in 1976, shortly after the death of Chairman Mao.

=== The era of reforms and openness (1980s) ===
When Deng Xiaoping returned to power in 1978, China entered a new era of “reform and opening up.” Communes were dismantled, and the private initiative was legalized and even encouraged in the early 1980s. Like other groups, Tibetans benefited from the new policy.

==== Hu Yaobang in Tibet (1980): observations and measures taken ====
According to journalist Pierre-Antoine Donnet, citing a publication by Jigmé Ngapo in Emancipation Monthly, Hong Kong, December 1987, at the beginning of the economic reforms initiated by Deng Xiaoping in 1979, Hu Yaobang made an inspection tour of Tibet in May 1980. During this visit, he found that the Tibetan people and Tibet were in a state of crushing poverty and not a single modern building had been constructed in Lhasa. Tibet's once self-sufficient economy had become completely dependent on mainland China. All consumer goods, including food, had to be imported. Tibet exported only a few minerals, medicinal herbs, and wood. Hu Yaobang took measures to revive the devastated Tibet by requesting a three-year tax exemption for farmers and nomads, the departure of 85% of Chinese officials from Tibet and the strengthening of Tibet's autonomy.

=== Opening up to the interior provinces (1990s) ===
According to Andrew Martin Fischer, the economic development of the Tibet Autonomous Region, initiated in the 1990s, increased the region's dependency and marginalized the majority of Tibetans.

According to Yves Kernöac’h, in the 1990s, the opening to China led to significant price increases, unemployment, corruption, and Han immigration, paving the way for dissent.

According to Robert Barnett, the most explicit justifications for using the economy as a means of control can be found in the writings of Chen Kuiyuan, the Communist Party Secretary of the Tibet Autonomous Region from 1992 to 2000.

According to Vegard Iversen, economists from the Chinese Academy of Social Sciences advocated a two-phase, 20-year industrial development strategy involving an uneven regional development path that favored coastal provinces in the first phase. In this model, western regions, including Tibet, served as suppliers of raw materials for the coastal regions. The extraction of raw materials from western regions, including Tibet, to eastern China was a deliberate policy. Prices below global market rates represented implicit subsidies and income losses for the producing western regions. For wool, estimates suggest a modest surplus value (53% of the amount received by nomads). For cashmere, the surplus value reached 360%. These are hidden subsidies transferred from western regions to eastern China. This policy significantly diverged from a development strategy in the interest of the west. Although industrial development and resource exploitation were limited, the forestry sector was heavily exploited.

Vegard Iversen notes that while poverty estimates exist for other regions of China, no such figures are available for Tibet. However, he cites Rong Ma (1997), who revealed in a survey that 38.5% of Tibetan household heads in Lhasa had no work or unstable employment, suggesting a significant number of vulnerable families in the city.

=== Gongmeng NGO report (2008) ===
One year after the unrest in Tibet in 2008, Gongmeng (or Open Constitution Initiative), a Chinese non-governmental organization (now banned), published a document entitled "Investigation Report on the Social and Economic Causes of the March 14 Incident in Tibetan Areas." The investigation highlights the limitations of the “rapid development” policies launched in the 1990s by the Chinese government, which “laid the groundwork for increased marginalization” of Tibetans.

== Growth ==
Development of GDP
| Year | GDP in Bill. Yuan |
|---|---|
| 1995 | 5.61 |
| 2000 | 11.78 |
| 2005 | 24.88 |
| 2010 | 50.75 |
| 2015 | 102.64 |
| 2020 | 190.27 |

According to Vegard Iversen, in 1982, Tibet had the lowest literacy rate among all Chinese provinces, in both urban and rural areas. The urban-rural literacy gap was also the widest, highlighting the relative neglect of public policy toward rural populations. In the 1990s, Tibet stagnated. Thus, Tibet ranked at the bottom in China and globally in terms of literacy (citing a 1998 UNDP table). Consequently, educational reports on Tibet contradict claims by Chinese authorities asserting serious efforts to develop the region.

In 1990, as part of the United Nations Development Programme (UNDP) to assess the level of human development in countries worldwide, the Human Development Index (HDI), a composite statistical index, was established. In 1994, China was classified in the medium HDI category with significant investments, despite low per capita income. The Human Development Index showed significant regional disparities in the People's Republic of China. Shanghai (0.865) and Beijing (0.861) ranked 31st, while at the bottom of the scale were Qinghai and Tibet (0.404), ranking 110th and 131st, respectively.

From the 1951 Seventeen Point Agreement to 2003, life expectancy in Tibet increased from thirty-six years to sixty-seven years with infant mortality and absolute poverty declining steadily. Professor Lin Chun summarizes, "Roads, factories, schools, hospitals, and above all, modern conceptions of equality and citizenship, however undemocratic they might be, had transformed the land of snows where the cruelty and hardship of an ancient serfdom had been evident."

Tibet's GDP in 2008 was 39.6 billion renminbi yuan. The Chinese government says that it exempts Tibet from all taxation and provides 90% of Tibet's government expenditure. Critics say that the central government in Beijing are stripping Tibetan resources and neglecting the welfare of Tibetan people.

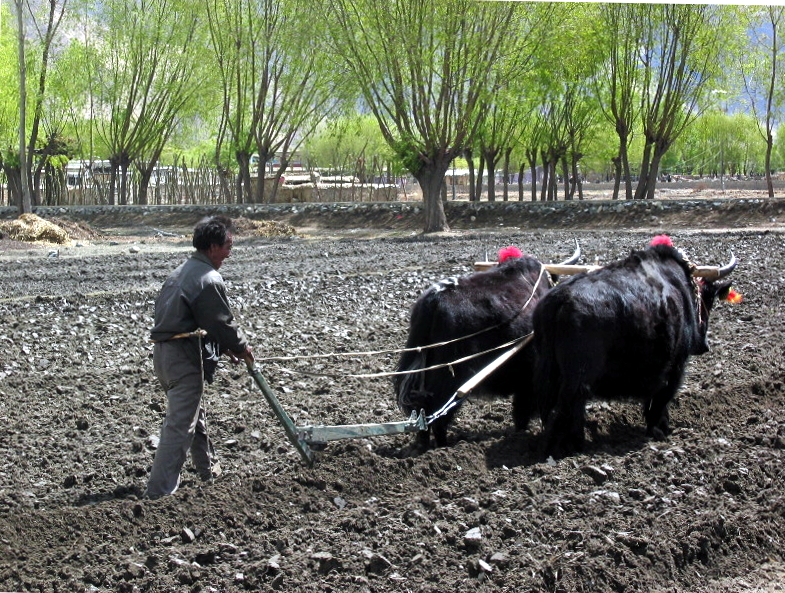
A Tibetan farmer ploughing a field; yaks still provide the best way to plow fields in Tibet

According to the Chairman of the Tibet Autonomous Region, Qiangba Puncog, Tibet's economy has grown on average 12% per year from 2000 to 2006. The per capita GDP reached 10,000 RMB in 2006 for the first time in Tibet's history.

In the first six months of 2008, economic growth in Tibet was halved after the Lhasa riots led to a slump in tourism, consumption and output. The region's economy expanded 7.4 percent in the period from 2007, down from 14.7 percent in the year-earlier period.

=== Chinese development efforts ===
In general, China's minority regions have some of the highest per capita government spending public goods and services. Providing public goods and services in these areas is part of a government effort to reduce regional inequalities, reduce the risk of separatism, and stimulate economic development. Tibet has the highest amount of funding from the central government to the local government as of at least 2019. Also as of at least 2019, Tibet has the highest total per capita government expenditure of any region in China, including the highest per capita government expenditure on health care, the highest per capita government expenditure on education, and the second highest per capita government expenditure on social security and employment.

The Chinese government allocates yearly economic and financial aid packages to the Tibet Autonomous Region, an amount that academic Lin Chun of the London School of Economics and Political Science characterizes as "enormous." China's most recent Five Year Plan includes nearly US$30 billion in Tibetan transportation infrastructure funding.

From January 18–20, 2010 a national conference on Tibet and areas inhabited by Tibetans in Sichuan, Yunnan, Gansu and Qinghai was held in China and a substantial plan to improve development of the areas was announced. The conference was attended by CPC Politburo Standing Committee members: Hu Jintao, Wu Bangguo, Wen Jiabao, Jia Qinglin, Li Changchun, Xi Jinping, Li Keqiang, He Guoqiang and Zhou Yongkang signaling the commitment of senior Chinese leaders to development of Tibet and ethnic Tibetan areas. The plan calls for improvement of rural Tibetan income to national standards by 2020 and free education for all rural Tibetan children. The Chinese government has invested 310 billion yuan (about 45.6 billion U.S. dollars) in Tibet since 2001. "Tibet's GDP was expected to reach 43.7 billion yuan in 2009, up 170 percent from that in 2000 and posting an annual growth of 12.3 percent over the past nine years." Outside observers credited increased interest in Tibet to concern over Tibetan nationalism which resulted in ethnic unrest in 2008.

Because the central government permits Tibet to have a preferentially low corporate income tax rate, many corporations have registered in Tibet.

=== Industry ===
In pre-1950 Tibet, according to the Slovenian philosopher and writer Slavoj Žižek, the ruling elite prevented industrial development out of fear of disrupting society, to the extent that all metal had to be imported from India. Nain Singh, who traveled to Tibet in 1867–1868, passed through gold mining sites, some abandoned and others active, named in Tibetan as Thok Jalung, Thok Nianmo, Thok Sarlung, Thok Ragyok, Thok Dalung, Thok-Bakung, Sarlung, and others. The map and description of these mines were published by Colonel Thomas George Montgomerie in the Journal of the Royal Geographical Society of London in 1868 and 1869. According to British observer Robert W. Ford, who resided in Chamdo in the late 1940s, Tibet was rich in minerals, including gold, but these had never been exploited. A monk named Möndro prospected and dug for minerals upon returning from training in England in late 1916 or summer 1917. The abbot of a region protested that this risked disturbing spirits and ruining crops. Möndro moved to another site and began digging, but the same issue arose. However, according to Bradley Mayhew and Michael Kohn, the 13th Dalai Lama invited British specialists to conduct geological surveys in parts of Tibet to assess mining possibilities. In a list of measures proposed to help Tibet maintain its independence, Sir Charles Bell suggested British assistance in bringing in prospectors and possibly mining engineers, while recommending that the Tibetan government retain full ownership and engage only trustworthy companies for exploitation. In 1922, Möndro continued his gold prospecting in Tibet with British geologist Sir Henry Hubert Hayden (1869–1923) when the latter's expertise was requested by the Tibetan government for mining surveys.

Many factories have been established in the Tibet Autonomous Region since 1959, but industrial development has had a long and prosperous history. The government initially tried to follow the industrial structure and development plans of other regions, while ignoring the actual situation in the TAR (scarcity of fuel, high transport costs, inexperienced local labour, etc.). There was no modern industry or infrastructure before the 1950s and people's life-styles and work habits were very different from those of industrial societies. Many plants rapidly became financially unprofitable and a drain on the government. The value of industrial output of state enterprises first rose to 141.7 million yuan in 1960, and fell to 11.2 million yuan in 1968.

With some adjustments, the value of industrial output rose again in the late 1980s. Moreover, as in the rest of China, the ownership structure of industrial enterprises in the TAR also experienced a major change. In 2007, for a “gross industrial output value” totaling 5,044 million yuan, 33,1% came from state enterprises, 5.6% from collectively-owned enterprises and 61.3% from "others" (private companies, joint ventures and foreign companies). Thus, private enterprise is now the main source of growth in industrial production.

According to the White Paper published by the central government in 2009 to mark the Fiftieth Anniversary of the "Democratic Reform in Tibet," a modern Tibetan industry has developed with mining, construction materials, handicrafts and Tibetan medicine as pillar industries, and power generation, processing of agricultural products and livestock and food production as auxiliary. The industrial added value rose by 15 million yuan in 1959 to 2,968,000,000 yuan in 2008. Modern commerce, tourism, catering, leisure and other industries that had never been heard of in old Tibet, are now booming as the primary industries in the region. Petroleum, natural gas, and rubber also play a large role in Tibet's annual exports.

=== Traditional handicrafts ===
The rapid economic development of the T.A.R. has brought about a revival of traditional handicrafts. Many Tibetans today draw a significant part of their income from selling handicraft and cultural products to tourists, or even to other Tibetans.

Founded in 1953, the state carpet-making factory in Lhasa has turned into a modern enterprise whose products are sold in Europe, North America and South Asia.

== Tourism ==
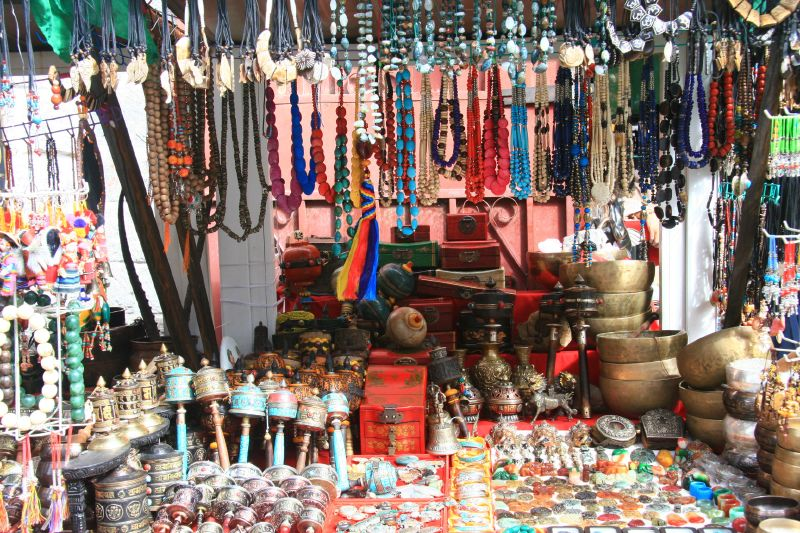
Souvenir stall in Lhasa (2007).

After opening up to foreign tourists in 1979, according to historian Pierre Chapoutot, the Tibet Autonomous Region received 300 visitors in 1980, 2,000 in 1984, and 28,000 in 1994.

In the second half of the 1980s, the development of the tourism industry, according to Vegard Iversen, was hindered by the Chinese state's presence in Tibet. While in Nepal tourism revenues accounted for more than 24% of foreign exchange earnings between 1985 and 1990, the number of foreign tourists who visited Tibet between 1985 and 1989 totaled 23,000, compared to 273,000 in Nepal in 1991, where the industry generated 73 million U.S. dollars.

In recent years Tibet's tourism has expanded rapidly, especially after the completion of Qingzang Railway in July 2006. Tibet received 2.5 million tourists in 2006, including 150,000 foreigners.

In 2007, the figure climbed to some 4 million visitors but fell to only 2,246,400 in 2008 on account of the region being closed to tourism from March till June.

Between January and July 2009, more than 2.7 million tourists visited the TAR, three times as many as for the same period in 2008, generating an income of 2.29 billion yuans.

In 2010, the region received 6.85 million tourists from home and abroad, generating revenues of 7.14 billion yuan, 14 percent of its total GDP.

Between January 1 and November 30, 2012, the T.A.R. received a record 10 million domestic and foreign tourists, as against more than 8.69 million visitors in 2011. Nearly 300,000 people are employed in the region's tourism sector, according to government figures. Pilgrimage tourism to sacred sites such as Mount Kailash also forms a significant part of Tibet's tourism industry, attracting thousands of pilgrims annually from India, Nepal, and other countries.

== Agriculture, livestock farming, and forestry ==
=== Agriculture ===
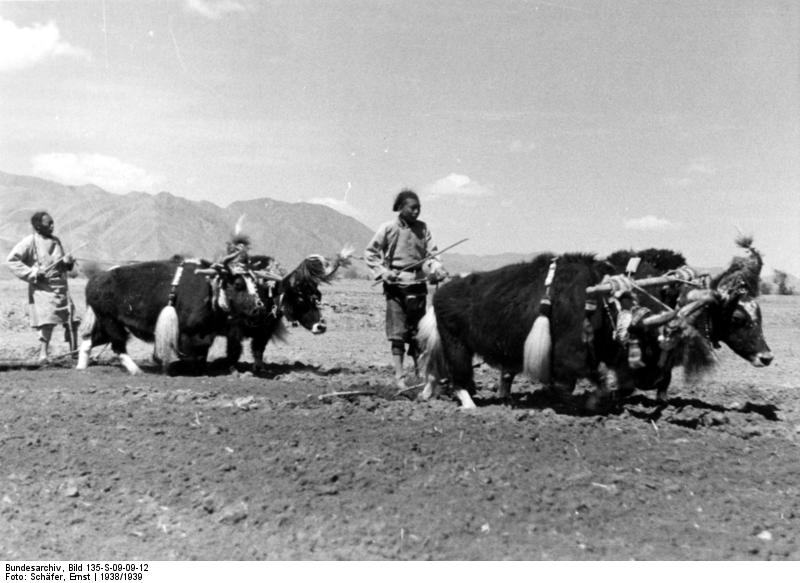
Shigatse-Taktsé, farming with yaks, 1938.

The economy of ancient Tibet was dominated by subsistence agriculture aimed at providing for one's relatives and family. According to Roland Barraux, the massive influx of consumers in the 1950s weighed heavily on the fragile food resource market, leading to inflation.

According to the Tibetan Center for Human Rights & Democracy, between 1954 and the mid-1960s, large-scale Han migration occurred in Qinghai (Amdo) to claim grasslands for agriculture, both for state farms and laogai (re-education through labor camps). Thousands of Han migrants attracted by agricultural opportunities began arriving in the 1960s, and Han cadres were sent to rural areas of the plateau for administration.

According to Chinese sources, in the fall of 1960, 200,000 peasants were granted titles to land use and free management, while nomads became owners and managers of their herds.

According to Laura S. Ziemer, in the 1960s, the authorities pressured Tibetan farmers to grow wheat instead of barley, which is the traditional crop in the Himalayan region. This resulted in two severe famines, unprecedented in Tibetan history: the first in the 1960s, followed by a second between 1968 and 1973, during the Cultural Revolution.

In 1997, Laurent Deshayes pointed out that there was a problem of “soil pollution from industrial sludge and various fertilizers and pesticides used to facilitate the growth of hybrid wheat, imposed by the authorities to the detriment of traditional crops, mainly barley.” These techniques made it possible to obtain very high yields in mountainous areas but ultimately “sterilized the soil.”

Interviewed by the Tibetan Centre for Human Rights and Democracy, Tsering Dorjee, a Tibetan native of the Qomolangma region who left his village to study and spent a year in Tibet between 2005 and 2006, reported that agricultural methods in Qomolangma had not changed since the arrival of the Chinese. Local authorities had recently introduced fertilizers and pesticides to improve productivity, forcing Tibetan farmers to purchase them or repay in grain. These farmers complained about the damage to the soil from the use of these products and the alteration in the taste of barley flour. The peasants could not repay for these products, and some became indebted.

According to Revolutionär Sozialistische Organisation, a Trotskyist organization based in Austria, in 2008, approximately 60% of the population of the Tibet Autonomous Region lived from agriculture.

==== Agricultural pests ====
Plutella xylostella is a pest almost everywhere cruciferous vegetables are grown, including the Plateau. The various weedy forms of Cannabis which have now spread worldwide originated on the northeast edge of the Plateau, in Tibet and Qinghai. Tibetan populations of Locusta migratoria show adaptations which allow them to respond better to hypoxia. Overall Tibet has been invaded by fewer agricultural insect threats, mostly because of its lack of sea access. Coastal economic expansion has allowed for invasions to occur, but as Tibet also begins to grow economically, it too may suffer the same fate.

=== Livestock farming ===
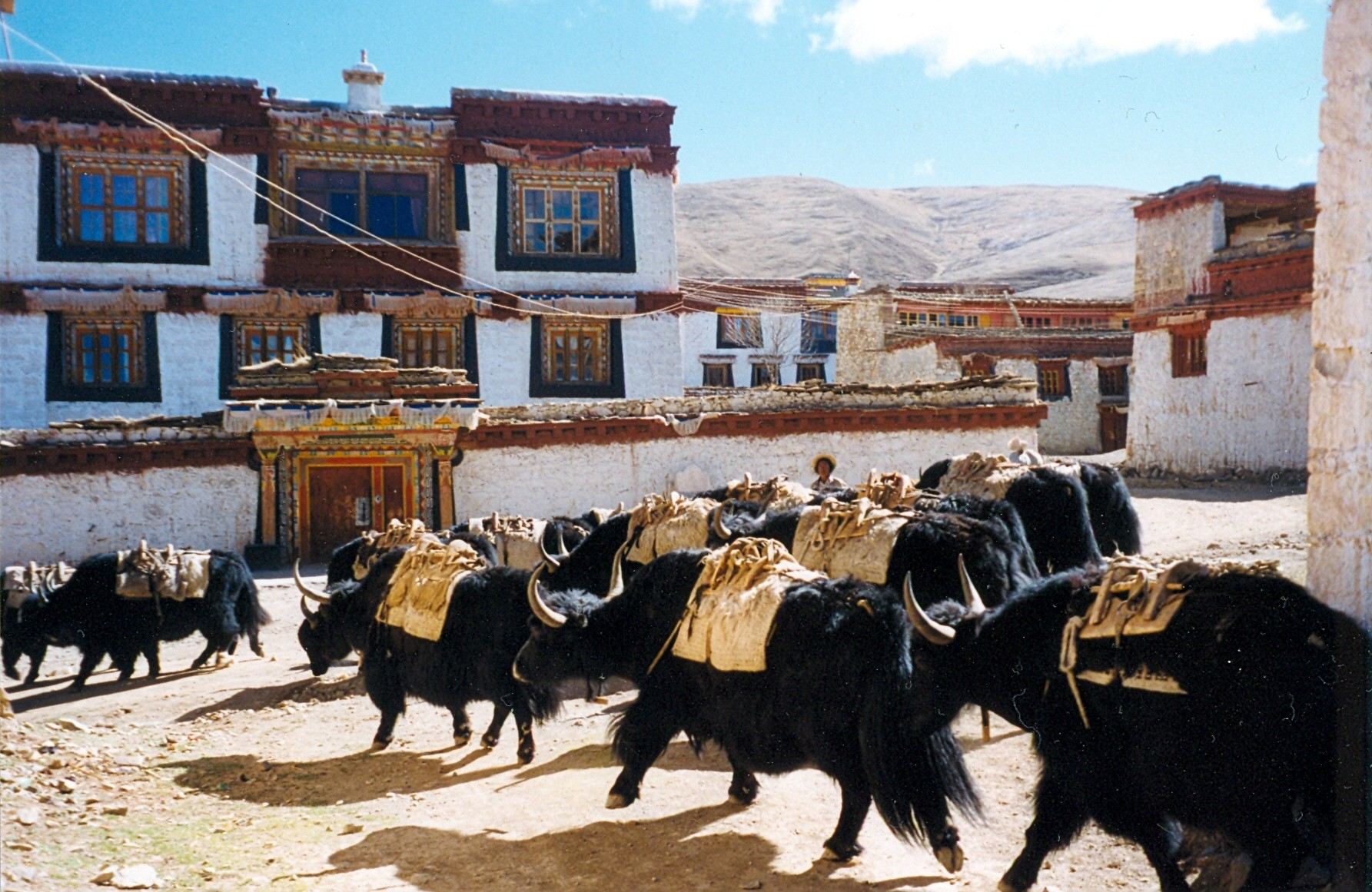
Yaks in front of Ganden Thubchen Choekhorling Monastery.

With its 80 million hectares of grasslands, Tibet is one of China's five major pastoral regions. In the early 1950s, the value of pastoral production accounted for two-thirds of the total agricultural and pastoral output. Since 1994, agricultural production has surpassed pastoral production.

The domestic yak (Bos grunniens grunniens Linnaeus, 1766) is used as a pack animal (a yak can carry approximately 130 kg) and as a mount, while also providing wool (used to make clothing and ropes), leather, meat (dried in the cold, dry air), milk (consumed fresh or fermented), and cheese. Additionally, its dried dung is widely used as fuel. In Mongolia, yaks are frequently crossbred with cattle producing hybrids which effectively replace yaks at lower altitudes. These hybrids are used as pack animals and for fieldwork.

==== Urbanization of livestock farmers and nomads ====
In 1996, a policy of sedentarization and regulation of nomads' freedoms was implemented in the Tibet Autonomous Region.

According to a 2007 report by the U.S.-based NGO Human Rights Watch, the Chinese government was forcing Tibetan herders in Gansu, Qinghai, Sichuan, and the Tibet Autonomous Region to abandon their pastoral activities and relocate to large cities. The Asia director of Human Rights Watch stated that "some Chinese authorities claim that their forced urbanization of Tibetan herders is an enlightened form of modernization." Tibetanologist Anne-Marie Blondeau noted that these populations, previously self-sufficient, were now housed in the suburbs of large cities under challenging economic conditions.

According to German anthropologist Adrian Zenz, several labor camps were established in the Tibet Autonomous Region. In a September 2020 report, he indicated that over 500,000 Tibetans had been coerced into joining these "militarized training camps." For Tibetanologist Françoise Robin, "the aim is to transform them through training that distances them from their traditional references to steer them toward a more assimilationist path. In fact, what all Tibet specialists fear is an intensification of assimilation."

Based on a description of nomads in the kingdom of Derge, a contemporary study analyzes the pre-modern Tibetan pastoral economy and social organization in the Kham region of eastern Tibet. It places anthropological and political debates on feudalism or serfdom in Tibetan societies within the context of local, historical, and socioeconomic factors.

=== Forestry ===
==== Forest resources ====
Tibet is rich in forest resources. It has 7.17 million hectares of forest, and estimated reserves amount to 2.08 billion cubic meters, the highest in China. The reserves are located in southern, eastern, and southeastern Tibet. There are alpine, temperate, subtropical, and even tropical forests.

==== Deforestation ====
According to Jean-Paul Ribes, president of the Committee in Support of the Tibetan People, in 1949, forests covered 222,000 km^{2}, nearly half the area of France. By 1989, half of the forest area had been cleared.

According to a 1998 World Watch Institute study, deforestation in the Yangtze River basin across China reached 85% and, in the year 2000, it was estimated that 80 to 90% of the forests protecting the soil on the mountains upstream of the Yangtze River basin had been destroyed.

In 1997, Laurent Deshayes stated that since 1951, industrial exploitation "had led to the loss of approximately 45% of the forested area." In mountainous regions, this deforestation increased soil erosion, contributing to the desertification of vast areas, particularly in Kham. Furthermore, as Tibet serves as "Asia's water tower, the hydrological and atmospheric consequences of these forest clearings were immense." The increasingly severe floods of the Yangtze, Upper Mekong, and northern India's waterways were partly attributed to this deforestation. Additionally, both deforestation and the conversion of pastures to cropland reduced wildlife habitats.

According to Jack Ives and Bruno Messerli, cited by Dorothy Klein, deforestation is a long-term issue, dating back not to 1950 but potentially hundreds or even a thousand years. They argued that the presence of peat bogs and surviving high-altitude trees indicates that Tibet once had more extensive forests. Moreover, society could not have supported the construction of numerous and large religious institutions if all timber had to be imported.

The damage caused by deforestation in the Chamdo region, capital of Kham, in the 1940s, was noted by radio operator Robert W. Ford: the hills were bare and eroded, with only a few groves of fir trees remaining.

China reports having imported 18 million cubic meters of logs from Tibet over a period of 40 years. During those 40 years, the Chinese estimate the timber trade for the autonomous region of Tibet alone at $54 billion.

== Commerce ==
Traditionally, Tibet exported hides, wool, and medicinal products while importing tea and silk from China and manufactured goods from India. This trade was conducted through caravans of pack animals (yaks, mules, horses).

According to Chinese sociologist Rong Ma, Han merchants played a significant role in Tibet's trade, and for centuries, the primary commercial exchanges occurred between Tibet and other parts of China. He cited an estimate by the British Consul General in Chengdu (Sichuan) from the early 20th century, which indicated that trade between Tibet and other Chinese regions was four times greater than that between Tibet and India. For decades, one of Tibet's three largest trading companies, the Retingsang company owned by Regent Reting Rinpoche, controlled, in partnership with the Heng-Sheng-Gong company, a Han enterprise based in Yunnan, the tea trade between Sichuan and Tibet, amounting to 10,000 bales of tea annually. At the end of the Qing dynasty, Lhasa had over 2,000 Han-owned trading companies and shops.

Trade between Tibet, India, and Nepal was also significant. Tibetan merchants were highly active, importing various goods from Han regions as well as from India and Nepal. Customs records from Yatung indicate that the annual tonnage of wool exported to India reached 544 tons from 1895 to 1898. Over 150 shops in Lhasa were operated by Nepalese merchants in the 1940s. Additionally, the British Indian government maintained its own trade agencies in Lhasa and Gyantse.

According to Austrian Heinrich Harrer, in the late 1940s Lhasa was home to numerous bazaars offering everything from needles to rubber boots, as well as fashion shops selling draperies and silks. There were grocery stores where, in addition to local products, one could purchase American corned beef ("monkey"), Australian butter, and English whisky. It was even possible to obtain Elizabeth Arden beauty products. Harrer noted that there was nothing one could not buy or at least order, including sewing machines, radios, and phonographs.

The salt nomads, with their long caravans trading salt for barley, became better known in the West thanks to the 1997 Swiss-German documentary La Route du sel (The Salt Road) and the multi-award-winning 1999 French-Nepalese film Himalaya: The Childhood of a Leader.

== Craftsmanship ==
In agricultural and pastoral regions, craftsmanship had always constituted a supplementary family occupation. Before the 1970s, most craft products were used for family purposes, with a few used for barter. In the 1950s, specialized artisans, concentrated in urban areas, numbered around 800 households.

According to Chinese sociologist Rong Ma, the main craft productions included Tibetan cloth, carpets, tents, wooden bowls, boots, knives, and jewelry. Apart from locally produced wool, leather, and wood, other materials (cotton fabric, silk, metals, etc.) were imported from neighboring Han provinces or from India and Nepal.

The economic growth of the Tibet Autonomous Region enabled the revival of traditional craftsmanship. According to Australian teacher and writer Mark Anthony Jones, many Tibetans now earned a significant income from selling artisanal objects and cultural products to tourists. These diverse products also gained popularity among Tibetans themselves.

Established in 1953, the state-owned Lhasa carpet factory became a modern enterprise, with its products sold in Europe, North America, and South Asia.

According to Vegard Iversen, in 1989–1990 Tibetan carpet exports from Nepal reached $74 million in Nepal, compared to only $11,000 for the Tibet Autonomous Region.

Approximately 2,000 artisans produce and sell Regong art along the Longwu River, which traverses the current Huangnan Tibetan Autonomous Prefecture.

== Infrastructures ==
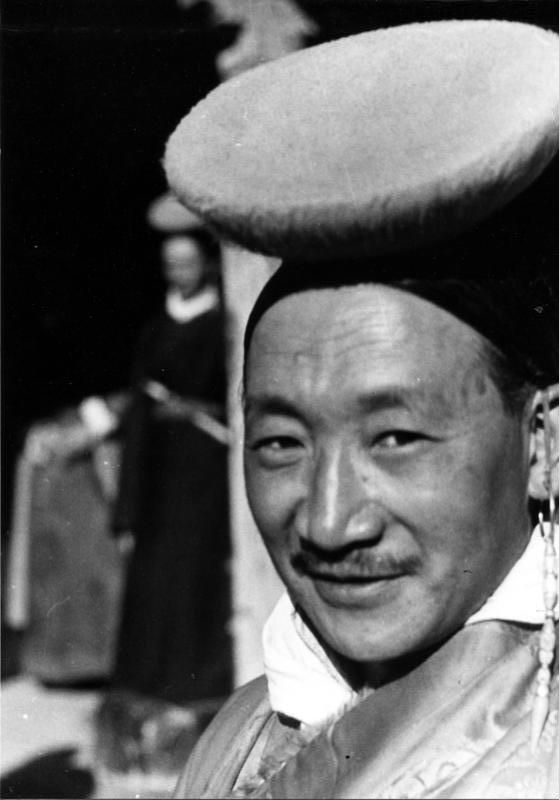
Ringang (Rinzin Dorji), 1938.

According to a report by Senator Louis de Broissia, "Ancient Tibet was almost entirely devoid of economic infrastructure. One need only read the travel accounts of French adventurer Alexandra David-Néel from the first half of the 20th century to grasp the archaic nature of communication methods in ancient Tibet, where travel times were measured in weeks." "If one traveled [to Tibet] from Qinghai or Xikang (a former province located between Sichuan and Tibet)," stated Li Youyi, "it took at least three months. The condition of the roads did not allow frail individuals to travel." In the mid-20th century, Tibet still lacked roads for motor vehicles, railway lines, and air routes.

According to Claude Levenson, the investments highlighted by the Chinese government primarily served to develop infrastructure linking Tibet to China and to fund a substantial administrative apparatus.

=== Electrical network ===
The construction of the first hydroelectric power plant dated back to 1927. It supplied the arsenal (Trabshi Lekhung) established by Ringang in Drapchi, near Lhasa, where currency was notably produced. In his book My China Eye: Memoirs of a Jew and Journalist, Israel Epstein reported that electricity distribution, often irregular, was limited to the Potala Palace and a few noble families. By 1965, he added, nine-tenths of Lhasa households had access to electric lighting. However, according to Dr. Tenzin Choedrak, in Lhasa in 1980, only the Chinese had access to electricity.

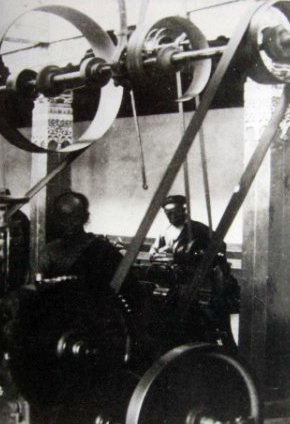
Trabshi Lekhung, 1933

The Nagchen hydroelectric power plant, located in the Lhasa region, was constructed between 1959 and 1960 by prisoners from a nearby detention camp. Affected by malnutrition and exhausted by grueling labor, several prisoners died daily, their bodies thrown into the river by guards. According to Tubten Khétsun, a worker on the construction site, the plant supplied electricity to Chinese work units, with the local population receiving only minimal lighting for about 10 days per month. In winter and spring, when water levels were lowest, the plant ceased to function.

By 1976, Tibet had several medium-sized hydroelectric plants powering cities, alongside numerous small plants in remote rural areas providing electricity to small rural communities.

In 2002, Tibetanologist Françoise Pommaret wrote that hydropower wealth accounted for 57% of China's potential, and power plants were being constructed to export electricity to the south of the country.

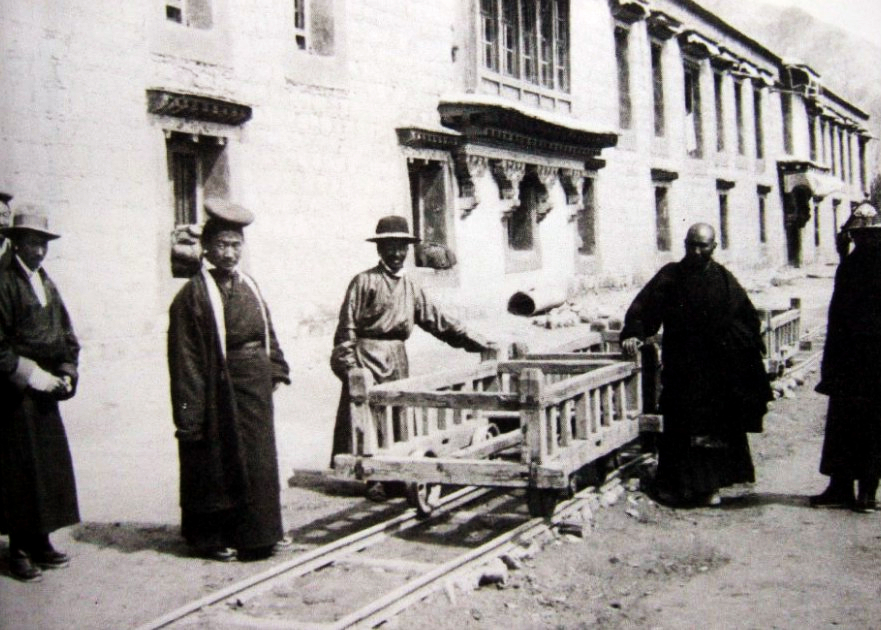
Trabshi Lekhung, 1933

Hydropower self-sufficiency was planned for no later than the end of 2010, with an installed capacity of 500 MW. Due to the dispersed settlement patterns on the high plateau, solar energy was relied upon to expand electricity access to the 1 million inhabitants not yet covered.

The largest solar power plant in the Tibet Autonomous Region began operating in July 2011. Located 3 km northwest of the city of Shigatse, in the prefecture of the same name, it was expected to produce up to 20.23 million kWh annually, helping to alleviate electricity shortages in the area and save 9,000 metric tons of coal. Funding was provided by the Linuo Power Group, a supplier of photovoltaic solar panels based in Shandong Province. In 2011, plans were made to build 10 solar power plants (including the one in Shigatse), collectively producing 100 megawatts. Solar energy was widely used by Tibetan households, with 400,000 solar stoves and 200,000 households powered by solar energy.

By the end of 2011, nearly 500,000 Tibetans in the Tibet Autonomous Region, or one-fifth of the population, lacked access to electricity. Chinese authorities planned to address this gap within the next decade.

From 2029 onward, the construction of the Medog Dam, associated with a hydroelectric power plant, is planned. This project includes the construction of four 20-kilometer-long diversion tunnels through Namcha Barwa mountain, which would redirect the flow of the Yarlung Tsangpo River. The diverted water would drive turbines connected to generators before returning to the river's course. The projected electricity output of 60 gigawatts was expected to be three times greater than that of the Three Gorges Dam, currently the world's largest dam.

=== Rail network ===
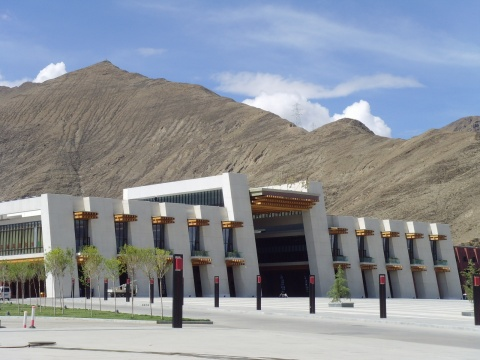
Lhasa Railway Station (circa 2009)

On July 1, 2006, Hu Jintao inaugurated the first train to Lhasa at Golmud Station in the Haixi Mongol and Tibetan Autonomous Prefecture of Qinghai Province. This new railway line connected Tibet to the rest of China, placing Beijing within a two-day train journey. It covered 4,561 km for approximately 80 euros.

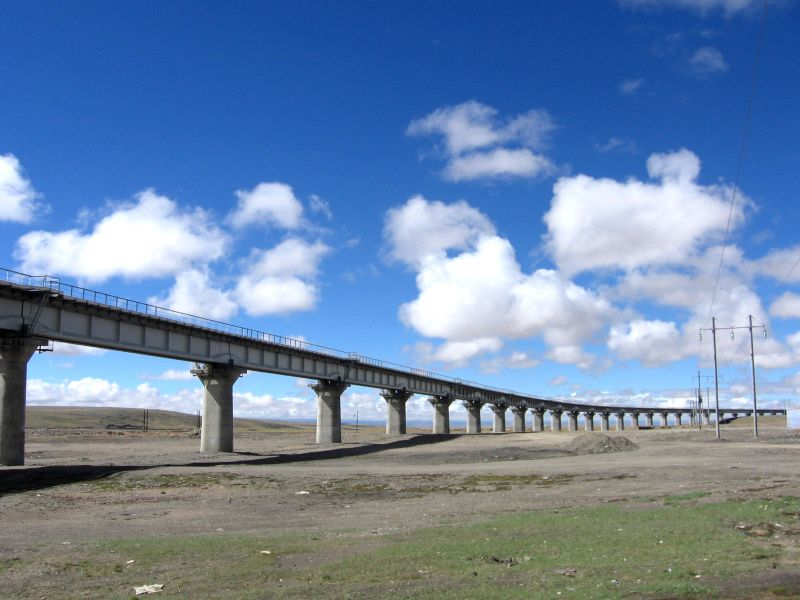
Qing-Zang Railway Line (2007)

Construction of a 253-kilometer extension of the Qinghai-Tibet Railway to Shigatse began in September 2010, crossing five counties. It was designed to transport 8.8 million tons of freight annually and allow trains to travel at a minimum speed of 120 km/h. Initially expected to be completed by 2015, according to the Regional Development and Reform Commission, the line was completed ahead of schedule in August 2014 and is fully operational. A further 435-kilometer extension from Lhasa to Nyingchi, planned in 2010 to start within five years, began construction in 2015 and was completed in June 2021, becoming the first electrified railway in the Tibet Autonomous Region.

=== Roads ===
==== Means of transportation at the end of the 19th century ====
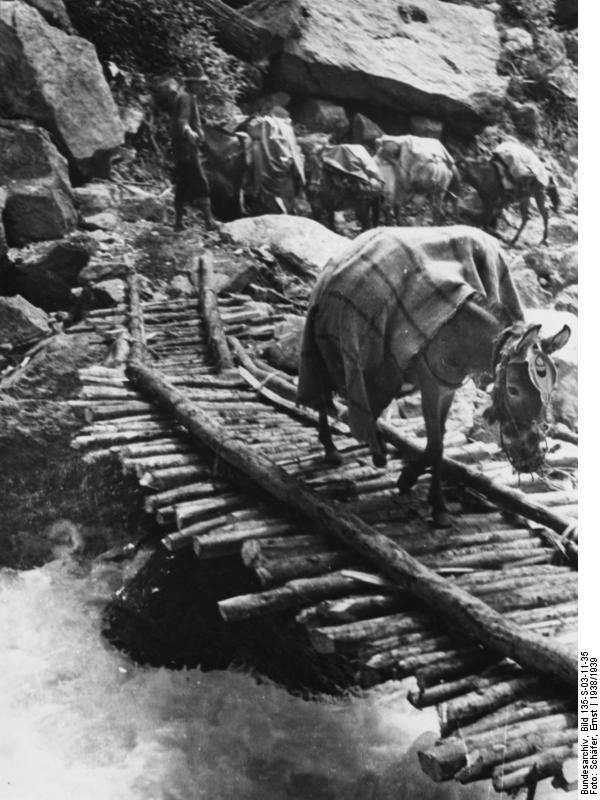
A convoy of mules crossing a wooden footbridge (1938)

In a book published in 1886, the French orientalist Léon Feer described the "means of locomotion" in Tibet at that time as follows:

The roads in Tibet are very poorly maintained; above all, they frequently present very difficult passages in the mountains and cross rivers and torrents; snowfalls often add to the obstacles. Little use is made of carriages; journeys are mainly carried out on horseback, on donkeys, and on mules; sheep and yaks carry the baggage. When snow has made the paths impassable, yaks are sent ahead to trample it and clear a trail. Precipices and rivers are crossed by means of ferries or bridges. Bridges are of several types; there are iron, wooden, and rope bridges.

— Léon Feer, Le Tibet: Le pays, le peuple, la religion

==== The absence of wheeled vehicles for transport ====
Edmund Candler, William Montgomery McGovern, Heinrich Harrer, and Robert W. Ford, who stayed in Tibet at various times during the first half of the 20th century, reported in their memoirs that the use of wheeled vehicles was unknown in transportation methods.

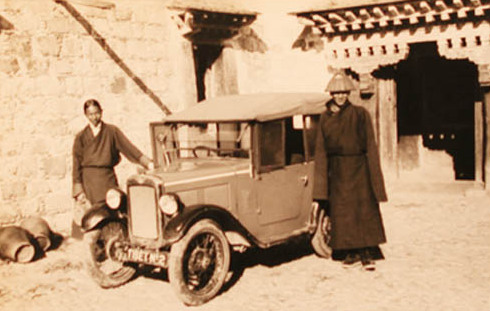
Vehicle in Tibet (1933)

According to Edmund Candler, the first vehicles to appear in Tibet were carts (ekkas) specially constructed for the British expeditionary force in 1904.

The American adventurer William Montgomery McGovern, who traveled to Tibet in 1922, reported that the use of wheeled vehicles was not only impossible for crossing mountain passes but remained unknown throughout Tibet.

The Austrian Heinrich Harrer lamented that the wheel was restricted in Tibet, despite its use in China for thousands of years. He argued that its adoption would significantly boost transport and commerce, leading to an improvement in the standard of living across the country. (Upon returning to Tibet in 1982, he observed that peasants now used carts with bicycle wheels.) Similarly, the Englishman Robert W. Ford observed that there were no wheeled vehicles, not even animal-drawn carts, nor any roads worthy of the name.

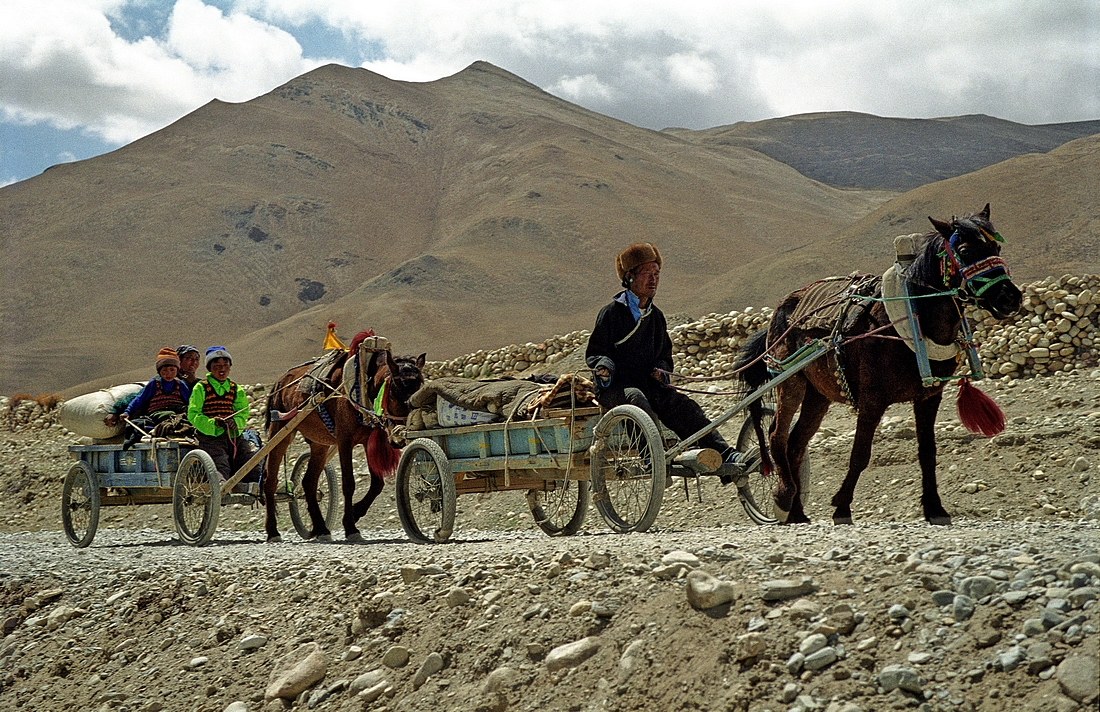
Inflatable wheeled carts (2002).

When leaving his winter residence at the Potala Palace to spend the summer at Norbulingka Park, the 14th Dalai Lama traveled in a yellow palanquin lined with silk, carried by thirty-six bearers and shaded from the sun by a monk holding a large peacock-feather parasol. This palanquin is preserved today at Norbulingka, in the new summer palace constructed between 1954 and 1956.

==== Objections to the construction of roads in 1904 ====
In his account of the negotiations leading to the 1904 Treaty of Lhasa following the British military invasion of Tibet, military journalist Edmund Candler reported the reasons given by the Tibetan National Assembly in its initial response, particularly opposing the British demand for road construction: blasting mines and disturbing the soil would offend the gods and bring trouble to the surrounding area.

==== The first cars and motorcycles ====
In 1925, the 13th Dalai Lama, who initiated a modernization campaign in Tibet, entrusted the governmental department overseeing currency, the arsenal, and electricity production to Thupten Kunphel-la, a monk from a humble peasant family. An advocate of modernity, Kunphel-la imported Tibet's first automobiles, a Dodge and two small Austins.

According to Dundul Namgyal Tsarong, the 13th Dalai Lama owned three cars and planned to build roads. Other sources specified that two cars were gifted to him, a 1927 Austin Baby and an orange Dodge, while a third, an Austin A40, belonged to Thupten Kunphel-la. After the 13th Dalai Lama's death in 1933, Reting Rinpoche, also supportive of modernization, became regent. He owned several motorcycles, and young Tibetans imported motorcycles during his regency. However, in 1943, the new regent, Taktra Rinpoche, a conservative opposed to modernization, banned the use of motorcycles and bicycles. The regent and conservative clergy believed that vehicle wheels would leave scars on the sacred surface of the earth.

=== Improving access to the region ===
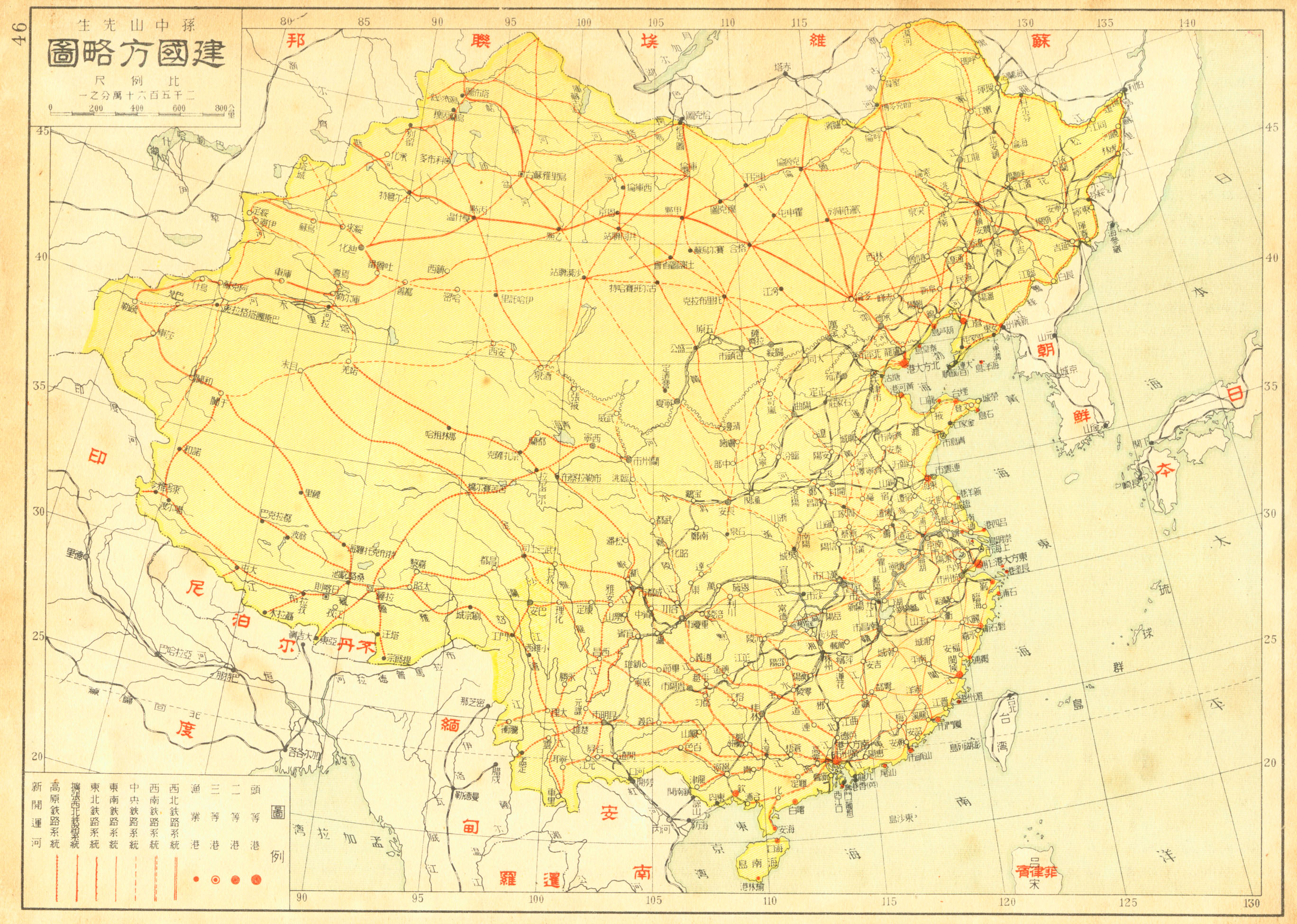
Sun Yat-sen's proposal for a railway network covering all of China, including Tibet and Mongolia (1917–1920)

According to Zhao Zongzhi and Jia Lijun, before the 1950s, under the 14th Dalai Lama, there were no proper roads except for a one-kilometer dirt road connecting the Potala Palace to the Norbulingka summer residence.

The development of Tibet's road network was undertaken by the Chinese government starting in the early 1950s. The first road, connecting Sichuan to Lhasa, was officially opened on December 24, 1954. Spanning 2,400 km, it required four years and nine months of construction. On the same day, a road linking Xining, the capital of Qinghai, to Lhasa, the capital of Tibet, was inaugurated. Approximately 2,000 km long, it was named the "Highway of Freedom." The first convoy of Chinese trucks reached Lhasa on Christmas Day 1954.

These two initial roads, constructed by the People's Liberation Army and Tibetans, marked a turning point for transportation by shortening distances between the region and the rest of the country and became known as the "golden bridges."

A third major communication route was opened in October 1957, connecting Xinjiang to Tibet via Aksai Chin and spanning 1,200 km. Thanks to these new roads, the price of Chinese tea, a daily staple for residents, decreased by two-thirds within two years. A truck could now transport in two days the same quantity of goods that sixty yaks carried in twelve days.

According to Adhe Tapontsang, some Tibetans believed that these roads would be an advantage, but most knew that they would serve far more for the rapid deployment of Chinese equipment and troops throughout Tibet. The road connecting Lhasa to Xikang, passing through Dartsedo and Karze, was built by Chinese from Chengdu and other cities in Sichuan, most of whom were forcibly enlisted, some were prisoners, former Kuomintang members. Altitude sickness and harsh working conditions led to numerous deaths, and the survivors became the first Chinese settlers living in a communist-ruled Tibet. Tibetans from Minyak or other regions between Dartsedo and Nyarong were hired to work on separate construction sites from the Chinese. Initially well-paid, they saw their salaries suddenly reduced significantly after the arrival of new People's Liberation Army units. When they refused to continue under these conditions, attempts were made to convince them to resume work, then threats of reprisals were issued, and some disappeared: they were relocated further north to Golmud.

==== The situation in the 2000s ====
By 2003, 41,302 km of roads had been built. The region had 5 national roads, 14 regional roads, and 6 intersecting roads. In addition to the 3,200 km of paved roads, there were now 32,195 km of rural roads connecting around 683 towns and 5,966 villages.

On January 15, 2009, China announced the construction of Tibet's first highway, a 37.9-kilometer stretch of road in southwestern Lhasa. The project was expected to cost 1.55 billion yuan ($227 million). Opened in July 2011, this highway connects Lhasa to Gonggar Airport in Shannan Prefecture. It has four lanes and solar-powered lighting. There were 216,478 cars in Tibet in 2011.

=== Airports ===
The first airport to be built in Tibet was Damxung Airport in 1956. As of 2011, the autonomous region had five civil airports: Lhasa Gonggar, Chamdo Bamda, Nyingchi, Shigatse, and Ngari Gunsa.

Gonggar Airport is a domestic and international airport serving the city of Lhasa. It is located about 45 km from Lhasa and at an altitude of over 3,500 m. Chamdo Bamda (or Bangda) Airport is located in Chamdo Prefecture at an altitude of 4,334 m. Nyinchi Airport is located in southeastern Tibet at an altitude of 2,949 m. Peace Airport is located in Jangdan County, Shigatse Prefecture, 45 km from Shigatse and at an altitude of 3,783 meters. Ngari Gunsa Airport is located in Ngari Prefecture, at an altitude of 4,500 meters.

==== Tibet Airlines ====
In July 2011, Tibet Airlines, based in Lhasa, took delivery of the first of three Airbus A319s it had ordered. The airline aimed to create a regional network covering all civil airports in the autonomous region. In February 2012, Tibet Airlines inaugurated three new routes connecting the city of Nyingchi in Tibet to Lhasa, Chengdu (Sichuan), and Chongqing (Sichuan), respectively.

=== Communications ===
During Tibet's independence and until 1959, Tibet had a postal system. In his memoirs, Heinrich Harrer mentions the existence of Tibetan stamps which were replaced by Chinese stamps.

The telephone only became available to the public in the late 1950s and by 1994 half of the counties in Chinese Tibet were equipped with telephone lines (28,000 in total), allowing Tibetans to call anywhere in the world.

Today, cell phones in Tibet feature Tibetan script.

=== Currency ===
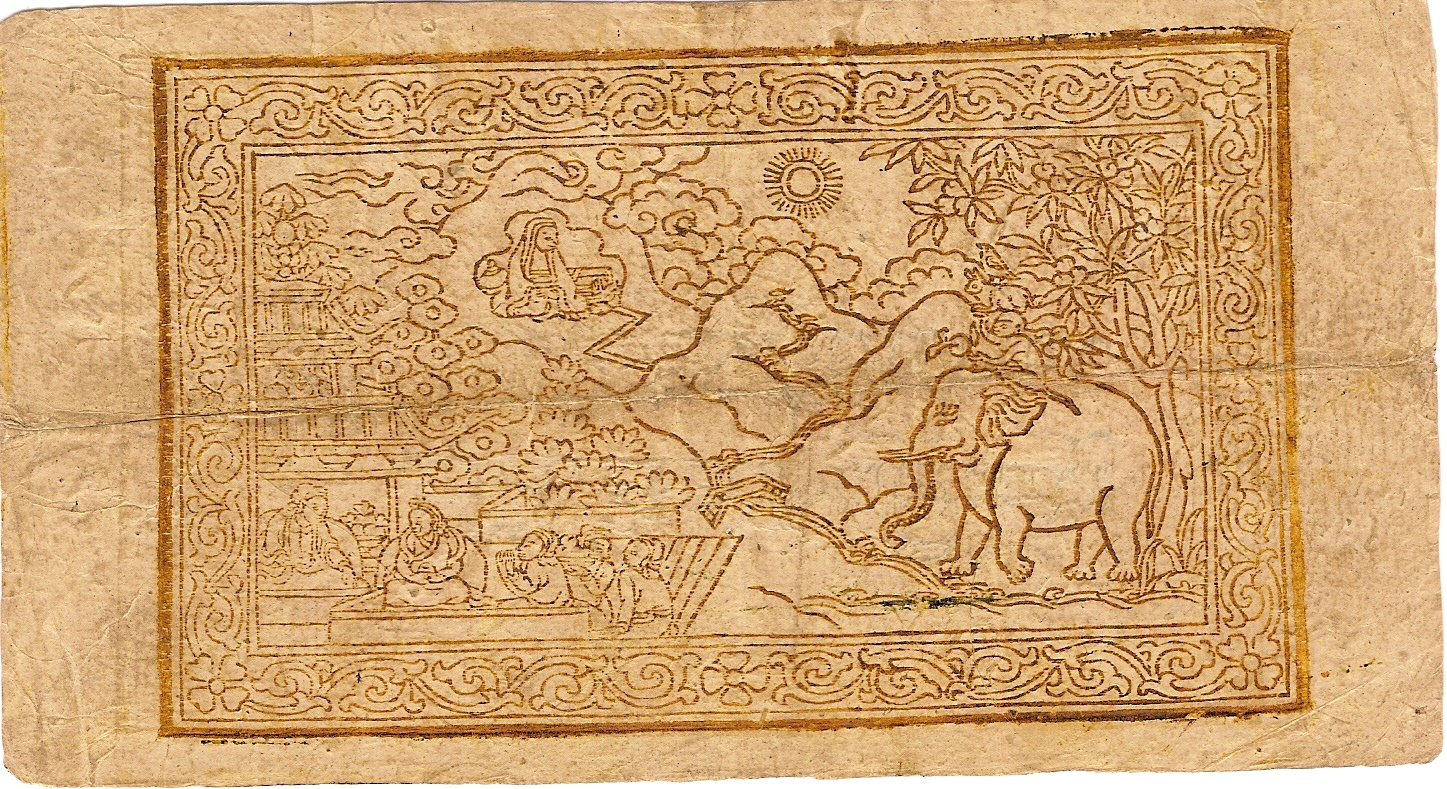
Tibetan 25 Tam banknote, dated 1659 (=AD 1913), serial number 15383 (backside)

The thangka was referred to as currency, among other things. Independent Tibet had its own currency (banknotes and coins) which was manufactured in a mint built in the 1920s and powered by electricity from a small power plant built at the same time. Later, the Tibetan currency was replaced by the Chinese currency.

== Economic boom (2000–2010) ==
=== The figures ===
Since 2001, Beijing invested 45.4 billion dollars in the economic development of the Tibet Autonomous Region. This had beneficial effects on economic growth, living standards, and infrastructure, resulting in double-digit GDP growth from 2001 to 2009. One-third of this amount was allocated to infrastructure investments, notably the Beijing-Lhasa railway, which reduced the cost of industrial and household goods for Tibetans while facilitating the sale of Tibetan products in the rest of China. Tourism surged, reaching 5.5 million visitors in 2009.

According to China's National Bureau of Statistics, Tibet's GDP in 2001 was 13.9 billion yuan. The Chinese central government exempted Tibet from all taxation and provided 90% of the Tibet government's expenditures.

According to the Chairman of the Tibet Autonomous Region, Qiangba Puncog, Tibet's economy grew at an average annual rate of 12% from 2000 to 2006. Per capita GDP reached 10,000 RMB in 2006 for the first time in Tibet's history.

=== A changing lifestyle ===
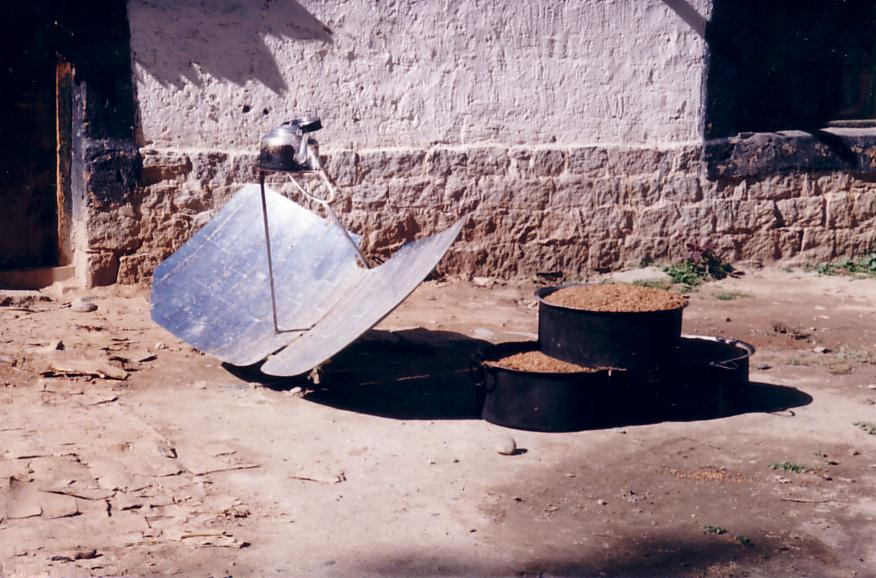
Solar kettle for tea (1993).

According to Xu Mingxu and Yuan Feng, the lives of Tibetans have transformed: electric bulbs have replaced butter lamps, cooking is done with gas instead of yak chips. People travel by bus, car, motorcycle, bicycle, and airplane, and they have access to modern amenities such as telephones, televisions, and running water. Computers and the internet have entered schools, businesses, social services, and administrative offices. Children, middle-aged people, and even the elderly enjoy watching television at home, visiting temples less frequently than in the past.

=== The shade on the picture ===
One perspective among Tibetan exiles is that "the state-funded exploitation of Tibetan resources primarily aims to support Chinese industry, rather than fostering sustainable development in Tibet." Additionally, urban incomes are five times higher than rural incomes, which are the lowest in the People's Republic of China, affecting 85% of the Tibetan population. Tibetan culture, through the tourism industry, is expected to become "a commodity tailored to the needs of the socialist market economy."

According to Claude B. Levenson, a recent and new phenomenon has emerged in cities with child begging, a clear indicator of Tibet's economic situation.

According to Kent Ewing, a journalist for Asia Times Online, Tibet's current economic development is criticized for "de facto favoring Chinese residents" and for its detrimental impact on the region's agriculture and ecology.

== Bibliography ==
- Buffetrille, Katia (2019). L'âge d'or du Tibet: XVIIe & XVIIIe siècles [The Golden Age of Tibet: 17th & 18th Centuries]. Guide Belles lettres des civilisations. Paris: les Belles lettres. ISBN 978-2-251-44974-6.
- Blondeau, Anne-Marie; Buffetrille, Katia (2002). Le Tibet est-il chinois ? réponses à cent questions chinoises. Sciences des religions. Paris: A. Michel. ISBN 978-2-226-13426-4.
- Harrer, Heinrich; Graves, Richard; Fleming, Peter; Harrer, Heinrich (1996). Seven years in Tibet. New York: Penguin Putnam Inc. ISBN 978-0-87477-888-5.
- Ma, Rong (2010). Population and society in contemporary Tibet. Hong Kong: Hong Kong University Press. ISBN 978-962-209-202-0.
