= Hu Yaobang's inspection tour of the Tibet Autonomous Region =

Inspection tour of Tibet by Hu Yaobang in 1980

From 22 to 31 May 1980, Hu Yaobang, General Secretary of the Chinese Communist Party, conducted an inspection tour of Tibet. Following the visit, Hu Yaobang publicly acknowledged shortcomings in Chinese policy toward Tibet, calling for greater autonomy for the region and affirming respect for freedom of religion.

== Political context ==
=== National context ===
According to Liu Xiaobo, during the 1980s an "enlightened reformist faction" emerged within the Chinese Communist Party (CCP). Holding decision-making authority, it advocated implementing political and economic reforms at the same pace. The two "enlightened" general secretaries, Hu Yaobang and Zhao Ziyang, promoted the beginning of political democratization.

Moderates within the Chinese Communist Party paved the way for increased use of the Tibetan language, the reconstruction of religious buildings (resulting in some regions having more temples than before 1951), and the promotion of Tibetan culture. However, Liu Xiaobo argues that this democratic movement was not sufficiently developed and lacked the determination and political skill necessary to succeed. The hardline faction of the Communist Party, represented by Deng Xiaoping, removed members of the reformist faction, whom it regarded as traitors.

In 1979, Deng Xiaoping invited Gyalo Thondup, the 14th Dalai Lama's elder brother, to Beijing. Deng told him that, aside from the issue of Tibetan independence, all other matters could be discussed and all problems could be resolved. He proposed that the Dalai Lama send fact-finding delegations to Tibet to observe the living conditions of the Tibetan people. The Chinese authorities believed that the delegations would be impressed by the progress made in Tibet and by the solidarity of Tibetans with the Chinese nation.

=== Local context: fact-finding missions by the Dalai Lama's representatives ===
Ren Rong, the Han Chinese First Secretary of the Chinese Communist Party in Tibet, reported to Beijing that political conditions in Tibet were excellent. According to him, Tibetans were ideologically aligned with the Chinese Communist Party and the Chinese nation. However, when one of the fact-finding delegations, which included another of the Dalai Lama's brothers, visited Tibetan areas in Qinghai, it received an enthusiastic welcome from the local population. Embarrassed by this public display of support for the Dalai Lama, Beijing asked Ren Rong what would happen if the delegation continued to Lhasa as planned. Ren replied that the people of Lhasa were more politically developed than the ordinary farmers and herders of Amdo and therefore supported the ideals of the Chinese Communist Party.

== Inspection tour ==
=== Preparation for the tour and composition of the working group ===
On 14 March 1980, the First Tibet Work Forum, organized by the Secretariat of the Central Committee of the Chinese Communist Party, was held. Hu Yaobang chaired the meetings, and two months later led an inspection tour of Tibet.

The working group consisted primarily of five senior officials: Hu Yaobang; Wan Li, a member of the Central Committee; Ngapoi Ngawang Jigme, Chairman of the Nationalities Affairs Committee of the National People's Congress; Yang Jingren, a member of the Central Committee and head of the State Nationalities Affairs Commission; and Zhao Zhengqing, Vice Minister of the Chinese Communist Party.

=== Measures proposed by Hu Yaobang ===
On 29 May 1980, at a meeting attended by 5,000 officials in Lhasa, Hu Yaobang proposed six measures to address the Tibetan issue.

1. Tibet should enjoy genuine autonomy and, to achieve this, Tibetan officials should have the courage to defend the interests of their own people.
2. Tibetan farmers and herders should be exempted from agricultural levies and purchase taxes.
3. Ideologically driven economic policies should be replaced with pragmatic policies adapted to local conditions.
4. Financial subsidies from the central government should be increased.
5. The status of Tibetan culture should be strengthened.
6. Han Chinese officials should be replaced by Tibetan officials.

=== Measures observed on the ground ===
According to journalist Pierre-Antoine Donnet,, citing an article by Ngapoi Ngawang Jigme published in the Hong Kong magazine Emancipation Monthly in December 1987, Hu Yaobang concluded during the early stage of the economic reforms initiated by Deng Xiaoping in 1979 that both the Tibetan people and Tibet itself were living in extreme poverty. Not a single modern building had been constructed in Lhasa. The formerly self-sufficient Tibetan economy had become entirely dependent on mainland China. Virtually all consumer goods, including food, had to be imported, while Tibet exported only small quantities of minerals, medicinal herbs and timber.

According to Donnet, Hu Yaobang declared: "This is colonialism in its purest form." Hu also became aware of the hardships endured by Tibetans and of the strained relations between Tibetans and the Han. He criticized Han officials while praising Tibetan history, culture, civilization, diligence and intelligence. He subsequently called for measures to revive Tibet, including:

- exempting farmers and nomads from taxation for three years;
- withdrawing 85% of Chinese officials from Tibet;
- strengthening Tibet's autonomy.

Hu Yaobang also advocated a pragmatic policy for Tibet, believing that Tibetans should be given responsibility for administering their own affairs and calling for genuine autonomy.

== Aftermath ==
According to Jean Dif, Hu Yaobang "officially acknowledged that mistakes had been made", and the regional Communist Party committee was subsequently purged. Journalist Pierre-Antoine Donnet states that, following the inspection tour, the Chinese Communist Party Secretary in Tibet, Ren Rong, was dismissed and replaced by Yin Fatang, a military official who had served in Tibet since 1950.

Following the inspection tour, thousands of Tibetan prisoners were released. The Chinese government also entered into negotiations with the 14th Dalai Lama, who was invited to send fact-finding delegations to Tibet in 1979, 1980, 1982 and 1985. Tibet, which had previously been closed to foreigners, was opened to international tourism. However, according to Jean Dif, China continued to pursue "a policy of colonization and systematic immigration" in Tibet.

According to Vegard Iversen, citing studies by Jean Drèze and collaborators, in 1982 Tibet had the lowest literacy rate of all the provinces of China, both in urban and rural areas. The gap between urban and rural populations was also the largest, highlighting the relative lack of public policy attention to rural areas. Since the 1980s followed Hu Yaobang's visit to Tibet, which led the Chinese Communist Party to reconsider its policy toward Tibet, the 1990 census can be used to assess the effects of this shift on literacy. Although literacy levels improved in many Chinese provinces, Tibet stagnated during the 1990s. It ranked at the bottom not only in China but also worldwide in terms of literacy (Iversen refers to a table published by the United Nations Development Programme). Reports on education in Tibet contradict statements by the Chinese authorities claiming to be making serious efforts to promote development in Tibet.

In 1986, taking advantage of the liberal religious policy adopted by Wu Jinghua, the new First Secretary of the Party in Tibet, Tibetans began publicly displaying photographs of the Dalai Lama for the first time. Wu Jinghua was subsequently dismissed in 1988 for "rightist deviationism".

== Analysis ==
Laurent Deshayes and Frédéric Lenoir argue that Hu Yaobang's analysis echoed the criticisms expressed by the 10th Panchen Lama, Choekyi Gyaltsen, in his 70,000 Character Petition, as well as those of the Tibetan Government-in-Exile: "Chinese policy in Tibet resembled colonialism; Tibetans were underrepresented in the regional administration; their standard of living had declined since the 'liberation' of 1951–59; and Tibetan culture was threatened with disappearance because of the lack of education in the Tibetan language and religion."

According to the International Campaign for Tibet, Tibetans remember Hu Yaobang as the only Chinese leader to have issued an official apology to them for the Chinese Communist Party's actions in Tibet.
