= The Dragon in the Land of Snows =

1999 book by Tsering Shakya

The Dragon in the Land of Snows: A History of Modern Tibet Since 1947
- Author: Tsering Shakya
- Language: English
- Subject: Geopolitics
- Genre: non-fiction
- Published: September 1999
- Publisher: Columbia University Press
- Publication place: United States
- Media type: Hardcover
- Pages: 606
- ISBN: 978-0-231-11814-9

The Dragon in the Land of Snows: A History of Modern Tibet Since 1947 is a non-fiction book authored by Tsering Shakya, a historian and scholar on Tibetan literature and modern Tibet.

== Overview ==
The book provides the first detailed account of the behind-the-scenes political developments in Tibet and Tibetan society during the beginning of Chinese occupation of Tibet, the involvement of the United States through the Central Intelligence Agency, the role of the Indian government, the mass uprising against the Chinese, the negotiations between the Panchen Lama and the Chinese government during the late 1970s and early 1980s, and so on.

== Reception ==
Writing for The New York Times, Seth Faison says, "[The author] has written a deeply insightful and thorough account that exposes the foibles of almost every major player involved."

A. Tom Grunfeld wrote a review for this book at China Review International and called this book "an important, judicious, and earnest attempt to overcome the politicization of Tibet (the virtual, the imaginary, and the real Tibet) and truly understand the history of this tumultuous time."
