= Cultural Revolution in Tibet =

Extension of the Chinese Cultural Revolution into Tibet

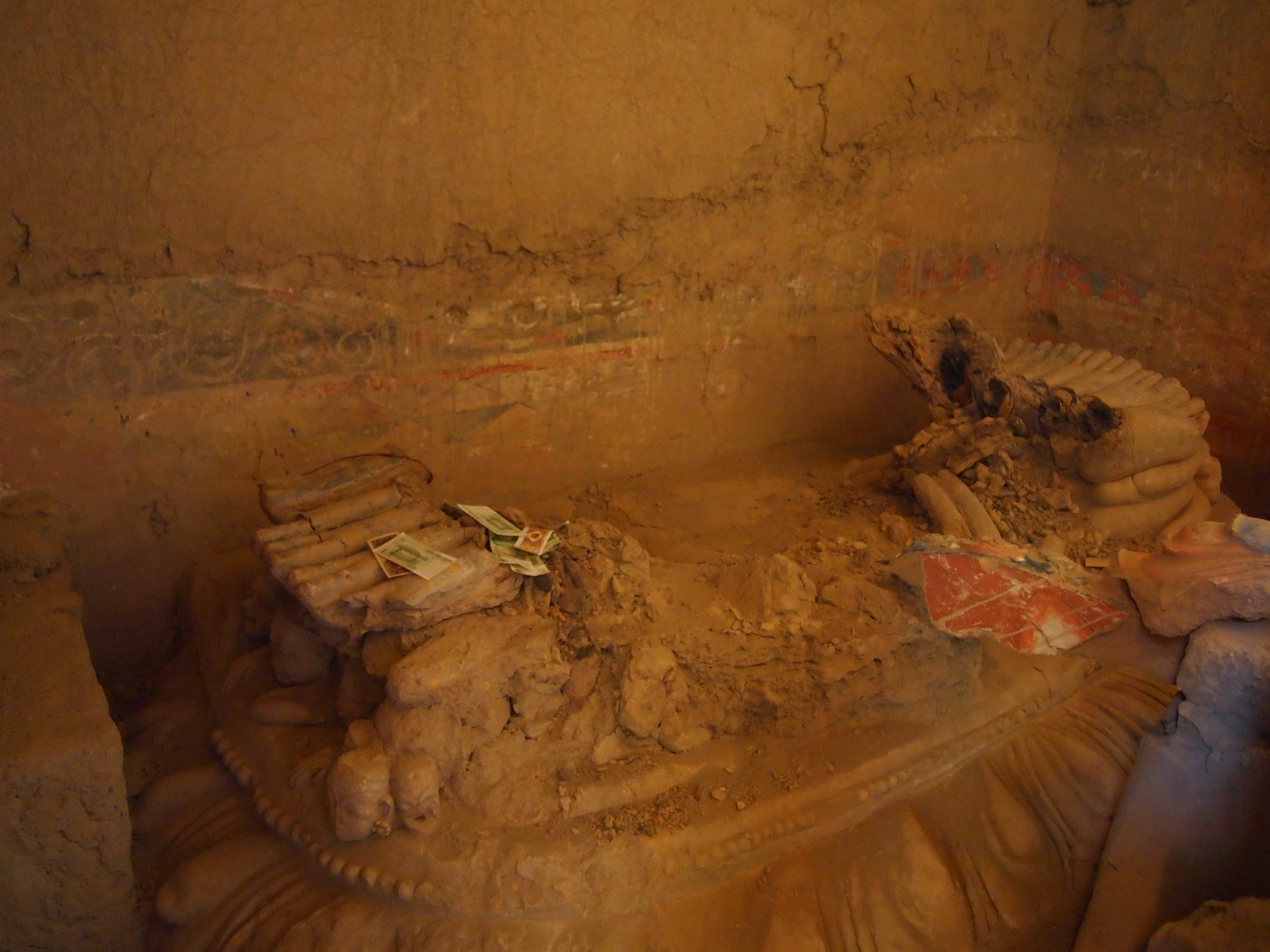
Buddhist statue destroyed during the Cultural Revolution at Tholing Monastery, Guge Kingdom.

The Cultural Revolution in Tibet was the extension into Tibet of the Chinese Cultural Revolution.

In 1966, the Cultural Revolution broke out in China. In June 1966, an extraordinary session of the Communist Party committee of the Tibet Autonomous Region decided to extend the Cultural Revolution to Tibet.

In November 1966, the Red Guards—mainly Tibetans from certain universities in Beijing—arrived in Tibet. Often combining their revolutionary work with visits to their families, they spread the Cultural Revolution to villages and pastures across the Tibetan Plateau.

According to Pierre-Antoine Donnet, from 1966 onward the Red Guards systematically, methodically, deliberately, and comprehensively destroyed Tibetan civilization. According to the Chinese writer Wang Lixiong, the authorities in Tibet often attempted to restrain radical actions; for example, the People's Liberation Army consistently supported the more conservative factions against the rebels. Temples and monasteries survived best in non-peripheral areas and cities where the authorities were still able to exercise some degree of control. In his response to Wang Lixiong, the Tibetan historian Tsering Shakya points out that he places the blame on the victims, whereas this mass movement spared no one in Tibet or in China.

== History ==
In the eyes of the ideologues of Maoism, Tibet was far from being completely "liberated". In her book Mémoire interdite. Témoignages sur la Révolution culturelle au Tibet, the writer Woeser reports the address by Premier Zhou Enlai on 15 October 1966 at the Central Institute for Nationalities: "The Tibetan region has been liberated three times. The first time in 1951, when the Liberation Army intervened so that Tibet could rejoin the great family that is our nation; the second time in 1959, when, following the uprisings, serfdom was abolished as part of economic reforms; the third time during the Cultural Revolution, when the lamas were able to emancipate themselves.

The Cultural Revolution markedly began in Tibet with the banning of the Monlam festival in February 1966. Led by Wang Qimei, the Cultural Revolution Committee was established in May in Lhasa.

=== Split among the Red Guards: the "Alliance" versus the "Rebels" ===
According to Melvyn C. Goldstein, as cited by Daniel Berounsky, in Lhasa in 1968, supporters of Mao and his slogans split into two antagonistic factions. One faction, the "Alliance" (Nyamdre), brought together supporters of the local authorities of the time because the situation in Tibet required special treatment. The second faction, the "Rebels" (Gyenlo), created at the instigation of itinerant Red Guards from inland China, felt the need to struggle against certain officials, in line with Mao's statement that "the bourgeoisie had infiltrated the party, the government, the army and cultural circles." A third force, the People's Liberation Army, remained outside this factional struggle.

According to the Tibetan writer Woeser, author of Mémoire interdite. Témoignages sur la Révolution culturelle au Tibet, the "Rebels" faction was led by Tao Changsong, a Han Chinese from Yangzhou who had been assigned to a secondary school in Lhasa in 1960. From September 1968 to October 1976, he served as vice-chairman of the Revolutionary Committee of the Tibet Autonomous Region. Melvyn C. Goldstein indicates that at the beginning of 1968, more than 300 cadres, including leaders such as Tao Changsong of the Gyenlo faction, Liu Shaoming of the Nyamdre faction, and Ren Rong, the military commander, went to study sessions in Beijing.

For Kim Yeshi, there were no real ideological differences between the two factions. They reflected the "power struggles raging in China" and grievances accumulated at the local level. The conditions for a "civil war" existed in Tibet.

Jokhang Temple was one of the two bases of the Tibetan Red Guards belonging to the Gyenlo faction. In June 1968, the People's Liberation Army came out of its reserve and attacked this stronghold, resulting in the deaths of 12 Gyenlo militants and two soldiers.

In 1969, armed uprisings broke out in several parts of Tibet. According to Wang Lixiong, Tibetans were fighting to defend their land and herds, which were to be transferred to the people's communes.

Melvyn Goldstein reports, regarding the Nyemo incident, the various types of slogans used: in addition to shouting "no more grain sales," "no communes," "freedom for trade," and "all power to the gods," more political slogans also appeared, such as "Tibet is independent". For the Tibetan historian Tsering Shakya, this was a nationalist uprising aimed at ridding Tibet of the "oppressor".

==== The "Nyemo Incident" and the "Buddhist Red Guards" (Melvyn Goldstein) ====
According to Melvyn C. Goldstein, Ben Jiao, and Tanzen Lhundrup, after their expulsion from Lhasa, Gyenlo activists shifted to the region of Nyemo, located between Lhasa and Shigatse, where they found support by exploiting peasant discontent over grain production taxes and by advocating the dismantling of the people's communes, all framed in the communist terminology of struggle against the reactionary capitalist line.

According to Melvyn Goldstein, in Nyemo, a former nun, Trinley Chödrön, joined the Gyenlo faction. She declared herself to be possessed by the goddess Ani Gongmey Gyemo, the tutor of the hero in the Epic of King Gesar, after undergoing the ritual of "opening the gates of the veins," while also describing herself as the "right arm of Chairman Mao." While she was motivated by a desire to restore monasteries, for the leaders of the Gyenlo faction she was primarily a means of attracting more supporters. The Gyenlo forces in Nyemo adopted the unofficial name "Army of the Gods of Gyenlo," and the official name "Headquarters of Peasants and Herders." Soon surrounded by around thirty "hero-warriors" claiming to be possessed by figures from the epic of King Gesar, Trinley Chödrön came to be regarded as the goddess Ani Gongmey Gyemo herself.

In June 1969, over the course of three weeks, around thirty people were mutilated (by having their hands or legs cut off) or killed by these "hero-warriors" following Chödrön's instructions: individuals who doubted her supernatural powers, opponents of the Gyenlo order, and people who had harmed the monastic community. These events were followed by the killing of a group of unarmed soldiers and cadres in Bagor district during the anniversary of the "Jokhang massacre." This success encouraged the "Army of the Gods of Gyenlo" to attack a military detachment in the county. However, despite the khatas believed to protect them from bullets, several attackers were killed, while the others retreated in disillusionment. From that point, the movement collapsed: some rebels fled into the mountains to avoid capture by the People's Liberation Army, which had surrounded their headquarters. The nun, who had taken refuge in a cave, was captured. Thirty-four rebels were executed, 28 imprisoned, and 48 placed under public surveillance. Thus ended what Melvyn Goldstein et al. call the "Nyemo Incident".

==== The "Nyemo uprising" (Kim Yeshi) ====
According to Kim Yeshi, in opposition to the establishment of the people's communes, Tibetan uprisings broke out, including in Nyemo. The nun Trinley Chödrön and her followers attacked the People's Liberation Army and killed fourteen cadres and soldiers. Chinese authorities observed that Trinley Chödrön's demands targeted "enemies of the faith" rather than the "agents of capitalism," the designated targets of the Cultural Revolution. The rebellion, described as one of "extreme violence," rallied hundreds of supporters and spread to eighteen counties. It was both a reaction to the Cultural Revolution and an expression of Tibetan resistance "to the attacks carried out over a decade against their identity and culture." The Chinese suppressed the revolt; Trinley Chödrön and fifteen of her followers were executed.

==== "Tibetan nationalist uprising" ====
According to Ann Riquier, during a wave of Tibetan nationalist uprisings, Trinley Chödrön, who acknowledged leading a rebellion from eastern to western Tibet that gathered 30,000 people, was publicly executed in 1969.

According to a Tibetan who witnessed her execution, the nun Trinley Chödrön, originally from the village of Pusum in Nyemo, was considered an emanation of Labja Gongmo, a sacred bird from the Epic of King Gesar.

==== "Dismantling of feudal strongholds" ====
According to the journal Revolutionary Worker, published by the Revolutionary Communist Party, USA, the "feudal strongholds" constituted by the thousands of monasteries were emptied and dismantled during a vast mass movement. According to available accounts, this dismantling was carried out almost exclusively by Tibetan serfs themselves, led by revolutionary activists. Religious objects, except for those of significant historical value, were publicly destroyed in order to break centuries-old superstitions. Building materials were redistributed to the population for the construction of homes and roads, and revolutionary armed forces often destroyed the remaining structures. This, according to the journal, was the verdict of the Cultural Revolution regarding monasteries and their class nature: they would no longer live off the suffering of the masses. From this perspective, the dismantling was not "mindless destruction" or "cultural genocide," but rather a conscious political act aimed at the liberation of the people.

==== Mao, a Religious Icon ====
According to Wang Lixiong, there is an issue that both the Chinese authorities and Tibetan nationalists strive to conceal: at the height of the Cultural Revolution, hundreds of thousands of Tibetans attacked the temples they had venerated for centuries and tore them apart, rejecting their religion and becoming devotees of Mao Zedong, the leader of the Han occupiers. This episode has since been disavowed by the Chinese Communist Party. For the Tibetans who took part, it is explained by the pressures exerted on them by the Han. As for foreign critics, they refuse to admit that this episode ever took place, unable to imagine that Tibetans could have deliberately done such a thing.

Jean Dif reports a Golok testimony from Amdo: "Tibetans must each morning list the tasks they intend to accomplish during the day before a portrait of Mao. In the evening, they return to report before the portrait on what they have done. Mao has become a religious icon!".

The nun Trinley Chödrön in Nyemo saw in Chairman Mao—of whom she claimed to be the "right arm"—the incarnation of the bodhisattva of wisdom Mañjuśrī.

In 1978, according to Robert Barnett, the policy of liberalization and opening launched by Deng Xiaoping brought an end to the Maoist era: traditional clothing reappeared, monasteries were rebuilt, pilgrimages resumed, and the Tibetan language regained its place. This is what some anthropologists call a "revitalization," or others a "renaissance of Tibetan culture".

In 1980, Hu Yaobang carried out an inspection tour in Tibet. Moderates within the Chinese Communist Party paved the way for increased use of the Tibetan language, the reconstruction of religious buildings (resulting in some regions having more temples today than before 1951), and the encouragement of Tibetan culture.

According to Laurent Deshayes and Frédéric Lenoir, Hu Yaobang's political ousting and subsequent death in 1989 "brought this tentative reform momentum to an end".

According to the journalist Dorothy Stein, while there is evidence showing that a large part of the destruction suffered by religious institutions during the Cultural Revolution was in fact carried out by Red Guards of Tibetan ethnicity, the blame has since been placed on the Chinese, while reinforcing a tendency among Tibetans and their pro-nationalist sympathizers to view events solely in terms of ethnic opposition.

For the Nepalese anthropologist Dor Bahadur Bista, who was in Lhasa toward the end of the Cultural Revolution, the destruction was not the work of Chinese but of Tibetans who were part of the Red Guards: former lamas, former monks, and former disciples of various monasteries, who carried out the destruction under the label of the Red Guard.

Tenzin Choedrak, who served as the personal physician to the 14th Dalai Lama and was imprisoned during the Cultural Revolution, states that "from September 1966 onward, in Lhasa as in other camps in Tibet, the Red Guards were all Tibetans. They spoke Chinese perfectly, but all understood our language. Every afternoon, they forced us to read propaganda newspapers".

The journalist Gilles Van Grasdorff highlights the role played by displaced Tibetan children during the events of the Cultural Revolution in Tibet: "The children taken between 1951 and 1955 were educated in Maoist communism. Some were among the million Red Guards in Tiananmen Square on August 18, 1966. It was these young Tibetans who would move into Lhasa a few weeks later."

According to the Chinese intellectual and writer [ Wang Lixiong, the majority of the Red Guards who reached the Tibet Autonomous Region were Tibetan students returning from Chinese universities. Due to weak transportation and the vast distances involved, in practice only a small number of Han Red Guards reached Tibet. The fact that they often kept the original name of their organization (for example, the "Capital Red Guards") is one reason they were confused with Han Red Guards. With the gradual return of these Tibetan Red Guards—who often combined their revolutionary activities with visits to their families—the sparks of the Cultural Revolution spread to villages and pastures across the Tibetan plateau, leaving behind a trail of destruction.

The historian Tsering Shakya notes that the Red Guards "felt that Tibet and the Tibetans had to be 'revolutionized,' and saw themselves as advanced revolutionaries coming to help backward students in an underdeveloped region," and that they had a devastating effect on Tibetan culture.

According to Kunsang Paljor (cited by Dawa Norbu), who worked at the Tibet Daily News during the Cultural Revolution, at least 8,130 Chinese Red Guards from 12 educational institutions in mainland China came to Lhasa, and only three Tibetan schools in Lhasa were involved at the beginning of the Cultural Revolution.

== Red Guards in Tibet ==
The Red Guards were a student mass paramilitary social movement that were first mobilized between 25 May and 2 June 1966 in China. Soon after meetings were held in order to facilitate the expansion of the Cultural Revolution in Tibet and in August 1966 students began to form the Tibetan branch of the Red Guards.

On August 8, 1966, the decision was issued to start the Cultural Revolution by the Central Committee of the Chinese Communist Party (CCP). The Red Guards were dispersed throughout China, at this time Tibet formed their own Red Guard in Lhasa. This began the Cultural Revolution's destruction of Tibetan prayer flags, religious art, and sacred texts. In September 1966, Red Guards from Xianyang and Beijing began to arrive in Lhasa. These guards came from the Tibetan Nationality Institute and joined with local Red Guards to intensify the campaign against the "four olds" and class enemies. Public "struggle sessions" were held by the Red Guards against "reactionaries" or "capitalists", in which people were beaten, and publicly shamed. Zhang Guohua and the Regional Party Committee wanted to minimize the Red Guards' access and criticism of the party leaders. On September 19, 1966, The Red Guards created and distributed big character posters that openly advocated the bombardment of the Regional Party Committee to many counties in Tibet. In November 1966 there was a citywide debate hosted by ten revolutionary organizations; this was to decide whether the Regional Party Committee had been "implementing a bourgeois reactionary line". This in turn divided Lhasa into two factions, both who claimed to be true followers of Mao Zedong, Gyenlo and Nyamdre. The State Council in Beijing once again gave instructions that banned the exchange of revolutionary experiences in Tibet, this was ignored. On December 4, 1966, the State Council announced regulations requiring the Red Guards, who were still in Lhasa, to leave Tibet and return to their own localities by December 20. Beijing Red Guards in Lhasa were given permission to stay by the Central Cultural Revolution Group, headed by, Jiang Qing. Red Guards ousted party leaders and took over their positions. In 1968, Mao sent People's Liberation Army troops into Tibet to gain control. This resulted in a series of public executions. In 1969, the People's Liberation Army disarmed the Red Guards all across China.

=== Birth of the Tibetan Red Guards ===
From June 15 to July 5, 1966, the Regional Party Committee under the leadership of Zhang Guohua held meetings to decide how to implement the Cultural Revolution in Tibet. This meeting was used to figure out how the Regional Party Committee, not the local Red Guards or other revolutionary workers and cadres, could control the events to come. The solution to this was for the committee to decide among themselves who was to be sacrificed as a "capitalist roader" or reactionary. Those that were chosen were to be singled out and criticized by the masses. In August 1966 students and teachers at the Lhasa Middle School and the Tibetan Teacher's College began to organize their own Red Guard organization.

=== Beijing Red Guards ===
In September 1966 Red Guards from the Tibetan Nationality Institute in Xianyang and Beijing began to arrive in Lhasa. Red Guards were encouraged to travel all over China to spread Mao's thinking and to ensure the "four olds" were being eradicated everywhere. With the arrival of the new Red Guards, the campaign against all thing capitalistic intensified. This began the power struggle between the Regional Party Committee and the Red Guards. Zhang Guohua was granted an order by Zhou Enlai to keep more Han Red Guards from Beijing and other areas from coming to Tibet. This order was ignored and in November 1966 three groups of metropolitan Red Guards arrived in Tibet. With the arrival of the new Red Guards the focus was directly on the party leaders.

=== Destroying the Four Olds ===
Many temples in Tibet were destroyed prior to the Cultural Revolution. The temples and monasteries that were left became targets for the Red Guards. In September 1966, Jokhang Temple was destroyed. Red Guards used dynamite and artillery on many of these temples and monasteries, therefore reducing them to rubble. Libraries were also looted, and rare books, Buddhist scripture, and paintings were burned. This was done in private homes as well as the temples and monasteries. Monks could no longer wear their traditional robes but were made to wear blue Mao suits instead.

=== Gyenlo and Nyamdre ===
Two factions were formed by the Red Guards in Tibet. These two factions each felt they were the true followers of Mao Zedong. The differences in these two factions stemmed from whether the Regional Party Committee had been "implementing a bourgeois reactionary line" or the "proletarian revolutionary line". The Gyenlo faction published leaflets and publications that spelled out their commitment to rebel against the party leadership. On December 28, in response of Gyenlo, mass organizations that were supportive of the Regional Party Committee joined together to establish the headquarters of Defending Mao Zedong's Thoughts or "Headquarters of Defending" for short. In February 1967, this became the Nyamdre. From May until December 1967 the disagreements between the two factions, Gyenlo and Nyamdre, escalated. The two factions fought armed battles in the streets of Lhasa.

== Abuses by Neighborhood Committees and the Red Guards ==
Based on photographs taken in Tibet during the Cultural Revolution by her father, then an officer in the Chinese army, Tsering Woeser interviewed 70 of the people depicted. She retained 23 testimonies for a book, Forbidden Memory: Testimonies on the Cultural Revolution in Tibet, which is unavailable in China and was published in Taiwan. She seeks to understand why temples such as the Jokhang Temple were ransacked by young Red Guards, including Han Chinese but also a majority of Tibetans, coming from Beijing or from high schools in Lhasa. Woeser explains: "The youngest often truly believed in Mao's propaganda. It was effective—and indeed, people all over the world believed in it. But we also realize how many had no choice: they took part because they were afraid, because it was the only way to survive." A Tibetan woman describes how the neighborhood committee gathered the population to go and destroy Buddhist statues, and threatened to remove those who refused from the civil registry or deprive them of ration coupons.

According to Mobo Gao, most of the witnesses interviewed by the writer Tsering Woeser (Wei Se) for her book Forbidden Memory: Testimonies on the Cultural Revolution in Tibet state that it was Tibetan activists from neighborhood committees—not the Red Guards—who caused the greatest damage to religious heritage. These activists were largely from very poor social backgrounds, and some were regarded by certain witnesses as ruffians, thieves, or bandits.

For the Tibetologist Robert Barnett, the involvement of ordinary Tibetans in the sacking of monasteries at the beginning of the Cultural Revolution, as indicated by some press articles, is neither a revelation nor the result of investigative journalism.

According to Thomas Laird, the Chinese government encouraged Tibetans to attack the traditional social and religious system of Tibet and to destroy monasteries. Unlike the situation in mainland China—where the Cultural Revolution aimed to root out rightists within the Party who threatened its authority—in Tibet, the Chinese Communist Party prevented the population from turning against it and instead became an instrument of cultural ethnocide.

Laurent Deshayes notes that, in the name of the struggle against the "Four Olds" (old ideas, culture, customs, and habits), a "wave of religious repression" began. The Chinese sociologist Rong Ma adds that conflicts between various revolutionary organizations and their escalation in dismantling the Four Olds in the Tibet Autonomous Region caused significant damage to monasteries and traditional cultural heritage.

According to Kunsang Paljor, who worked at the Tibet Daily during the Cultural Revolution, Chinese Red Guards did not come only with an ideological mission but also to promote the sinicization of Tibetans in the name of Mao Zedong Thought. The Cultural Revolution in Tibet led to a systematic destruction of indigenous cultures and attempts to forcibly impose Han culture on Tibetans. Kunsang Paljor explains that when the Red Guards attacked temples and monasteries in Lhasa, young Chinese participants knew what they wanted to destroy and what they wanted to preserve. All valuable objects from Tsuglak Khang, Ramoche, Norbulingka, Tengyeling, Dzong Kyap Lukhang, and others were carefully packed and prepared for removal. Only then did the Red Guards allow destruction to proceed.

According to Gilles Van Grasdorff, the abuses committed during the Cultural Revolution by the Red Guards against the religious community led to persecution and humiliation, notably through thamzings (public struggle sessions).

According to Pierre-Antoine Donnet, acts of torture included the rape of Tibetan women and even children. Victims were also mutilated—their hands, ears, noses, and tongues cut off—and were sometimes forced to dig their own graves before being executed.

During the Cultural Revolution in Tibetan regions, the tombs of certain great Buddhist masters were desecrated. Thus, the tomb of Tsongkhapa at Ganden Monastery was destroyed by the Red Guards, who forced a Tibetan lama, Bomi Rinpoché, to throw Tsongkhapa's mummy into the fire. Likewise, the remains of previous Panchen Lamas were desecrated by the Red Guards.

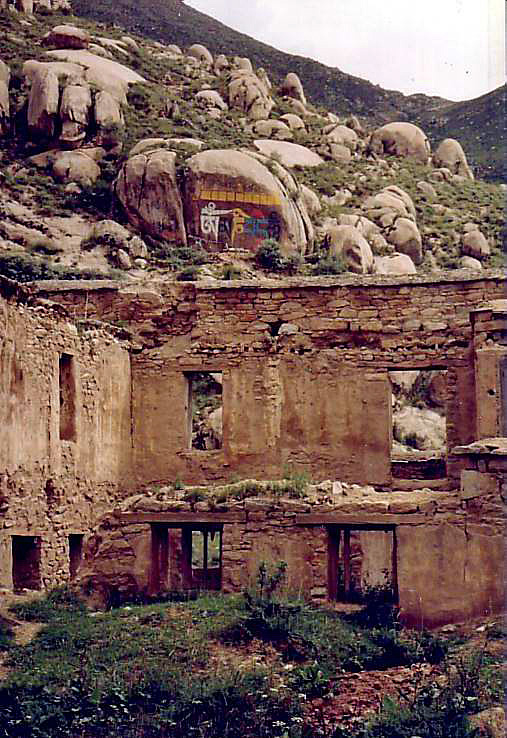
Photograph from 1993 of a damaged section of the Drepung Monastery.

According to the Tibetan government-in-exile, of the 6,259 monasteries and nunneries that existed across all Tibetan regions, only about eight remained in 1976. According to the International Campaign for Tibet, they were partially or totally destroyed during the 1960s and 1970s. Thomas Laird believes that while some monasteries had been destroyed by bombardments during the 1949–1951 invasion and the 1958–1959 rebellion, most were dismantled during the Cultural Revolution.

At the beginning of the 1980s, the American journalist Fox Butterfield reported that Chinese officials had informed him that before 1959 there were 2,464 monasteries in Tibet, and that after the Cultural Revolution only ten remained. They notably mentioned that one of them, Ganden Monastery—the third largest, which housed 10,000 monks—had simply disappeared. For its part, the Tibet Mapping Institute states that "If it is said that more than 2,000 monasteries and sacred sites were destroyed by the Red Guards (...), no one can provide a list or locate them on a map. We are still waiting for a Tibetologist to compile a list and description of Tibet's sacred sites".

The Tibetologist Fabienne Jagou disputes these figures and dates, arguing that the number of monasteries still standing in 1966 had already dropped to about a quarter of their 1959 number (i.e., 2,176 to 2,500), and that most of the destruction occurred not during the Cultural Revolution but between 1959 and 1966. She also notes that the figure of 6,254 put forward by Michael van Walt van Praag in 1987 is "now contested".

=== Examples ===
According to Pierre-Antoine Donnet, the Jokhang Temple and Ramoche Temple in central Lhasa were among the first targets of the Red Guards. The sacking of the Jokhang began on August 6, 1966. After these two sites, they turned to the Norbulingka, where all the palaces were meticulously looted. The movement spread throughout Lhasa; only the Potala Palace and 13 other religious sites in Tibet were off-limits to the Red Guards, reportedly by order of Prime Minister Zhou Enlai, according to later claims by the Chinese government and some Western historians.

Dawa Norbu describes the case of the town of Sakya, where there were 108 monasteries and temples. By 1968, only one remained. The Cultural Revolution there was carried out systematically: first, a few Red Guards arrived and held a meeting with Chinese administrative staff and local progressives (yar-thonpa). Then they toured the town announcing the Great Proletarian Cultural Revolution and rhetorically asked, "Who will volunteer to destroy the centers of superstition?" When most villagers hesitated, a large crowd from another village—Dongka, in this case—came and destroyed most of the famous monasteries. The Chinese authorities also appealed to Tibetans' interest in the wood from monastery structures, which they were allowed to take. Gold, silver, and precious ornaments from statues had been carefully collected by the Cultural Relics Commission before the Red Guards arrived; most informants say they were sent to China.

According to the Tibet Bureau in New York, the famous statue of Jowo Mikyoe Dorjee—venerated since its arrival in Tibet in the 7th century and located in the Ramoche Temple—was dismantled and sent to China during the Cultural Revolution. Its restoration in 1985 was due to Ribur Rinpoché and the 10th Panchen Lama. A 16-meter-high statue of the Buddha, built by the Karma Pakshi in a temple at Tsurphu Monastery in the 13th century—made of bronze and gold and housing relics of Gautama Buddha and some of his disciples—was dynamited by the Red Guards in the 1960s.

As the old Tibet was dismantled, wood and building materials from destroyed monasteries were reused to construct barracks for the People's Liberation Army or housing for Chinese officials in Lhasa. The Chinese Communist Party allowed some temples to be preserved as grain warehouses or headquarters. The clay Buddha statues they contained were smashed or melted in the rain after roofs were torn off. Copper statues were broken and left in heaps, while those made of gold, silver, and bronze were removed and transported to China by truck. In a foundry near Beijing, more than 600 tons of these statues were processed. Most of the cultural heritage disappeared. Tibetan children were even forced to dismantle temples.

According to the Chinese writer Mobo Gao, authorities in Tibet often tried to restrain radical actions; thus, the People's Liberation Army systematically supported the more conservative factions against the rebels. Temples and monasteries survived best in non-peripheral areas and cities where authorities were still more or less able to maintain order. By contrast, Ganden Monastery, located about 60 km from Lhasa and one of the main centers of the Gelug (Yellow Hat) school of Tibetan Buddhism, was reduced to ruins. In response to Wang Lixiong, the Tibetan historian Tsering Shakya points out that he places the blame on the victim, whereas this mass movement spared no one in Tibet any more than in China.

For the 10th Panchen Lama, it is inaccurate to say that the destructive forces of the Cultural Revolution were directed solely against Tibet or the Tibetan nationality (ethnic group): indeed, the wave of destruction and gratuitous vandalism that affected Tibet and Tibetan-populated areas also affected the entire country and all regions of China's 56 nationalities, including the Han. It is therefore wrong to describe this episode as the total destruction of Tibetan culture by the Chinese.

=== Attacks on Individuals ===
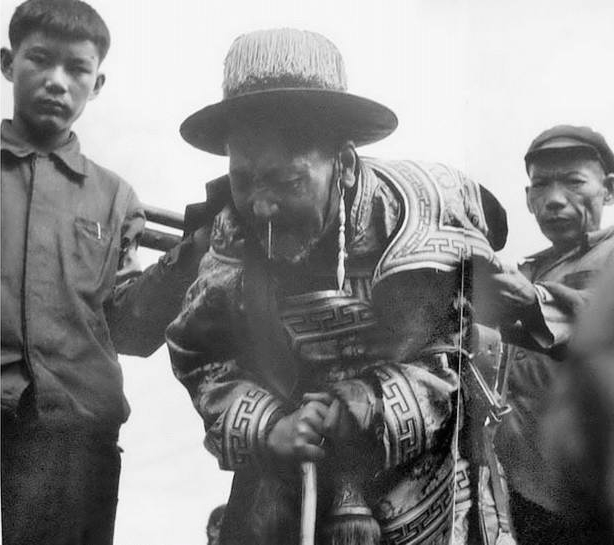
Struggle session of Sampho Tsewang Rigzin in Tibet.

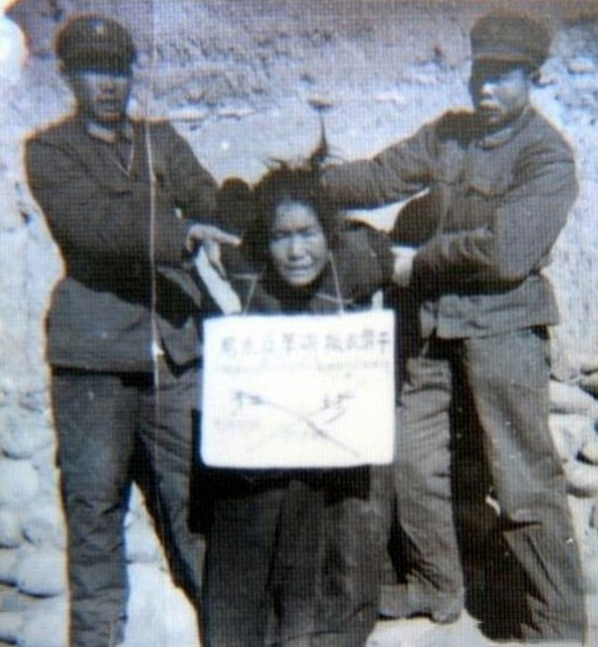
Tibetan woman named Rindron, executed for participating in the counter-revolutionary Nyemo uprising during the Cultural Revolution (1969).

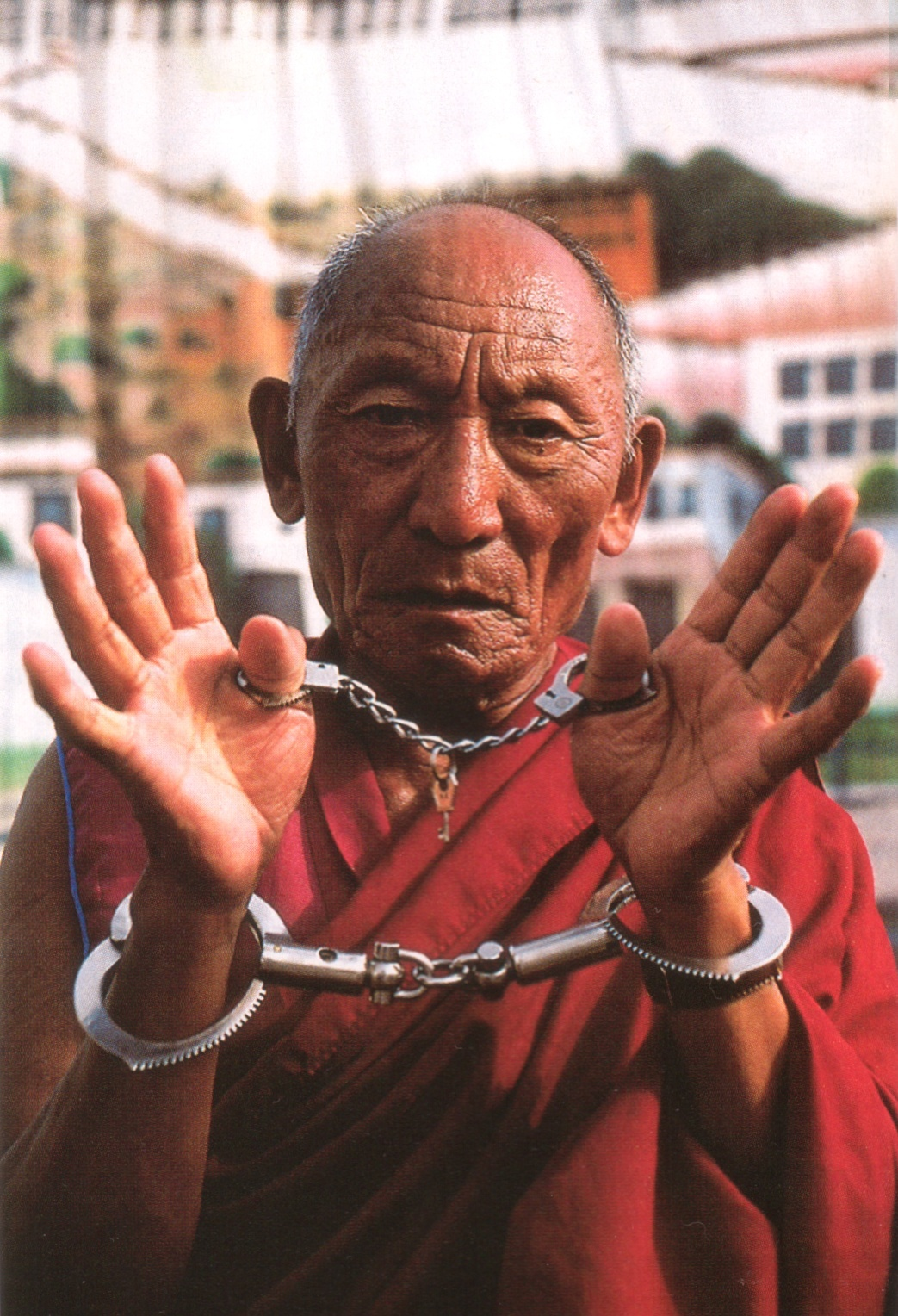
Palden Gyatso, July 2000, in France.

The destruction also affected private homes. Prayer flags that adorned the roofs and altars of most Tibetan dwellings were destroyed. Houses were often ransacked, and if "old" Tibetan items were found hidden there—not only religious ones, but also things such as old Tibetan banknotes or traditional clothing—the head of the household was punished.

According to the authors of The Black Book of Communism, the Cultural Revolution is believed to have caused between 400,000 and 1 million deaths across China. According to the Central Tibetan Administration, in Tibet (Ü-Tsang, Amdo, Kham), out of a total of 592,000 monks and nuns, more than 110,000 were reportedly tortured and killed, and 250,000 were forcibly defrocked.

According to Thomas Laird, members of the Tibetan elite who had been used by the Chinese authorities during the 1950s and 1960s were stigmatized by the Red Guards during thamzing (struggle sessions or self-criticism sessions), where they were beaten and tortured; those who did not die were imprisoned. The Tibetan government-in-exile estimates that 92,000 Tibetans died during these sessions.

During the Cultural Revolution, Ribur Rinpoché was subjected to 35 "struggle sessions" before crowds of 30 to 400 people. Usually in the evening, between 8 p.m. and 11 p.m. after work, he had to wear a long pointed hat and his monk's robe to signify his "bad class status." Various badges and religious objects were attached to him to ridicule him, and he was paraded through the market of Lhasa, accompanied by trumpets, gongs, and the jeers of the Red Guards. His accuser, a Chinese official named Guo Xianzhi, head of the Lhasa district, accused him of secret contacts with the Dalai Lama, with "foreign reactionaries," and of wanting to create a movement for Tibetan independence. He had to appear before the public with his hands on the ground and head bowed, and was then beaten and criticized. On one occasion, he was struck on the right ear with a rifle butt and has had impaired hearing ever since.

In his 1990 book Tibet: Dead or Alive, Pierre-Antoine Donnet writes: "In the absence of verifiable figures, it seems evident to a foreign observer that hundreds of thousands of Tibetans disappeared, victims of unnatural deaths, during the Cultural Revolution".

In November 1970, Palden Gyatso witnessed public executions, which he describes with horror in his autobiography. He was taken, along with hundreds of other Tibetans, from prisons in Lhasa to Drapchi Prison to attend an annual "rewards and punishments" meeting. Guards pulled from the ranks those prisoners who were to be executed—bound and gagged, with heavy wooden plaques engraved with Chinese characters hanging around their necks. Palden Gyatso was forced to step forward near Kundaling Kusang, a well-known Tibetan woman whose face was swollen and covered in bruises, barely able to breathe, and who was accused of counter-revolutionary activities aimed at overthrowing the proletarian dictatorship. She, along with 14 other Tibetans, was forced to kneel before a pit near Sera Monastery and was shot by a firing squad; those who survived the first volley were finished off with point-blank shots. Families were later informed through a bill indicating the number of bullets used and the length of rope used to bind the victims. In 1971, Palden Gyatso witnessed three more death sentences; one of the prisoners was accused solely of having scratched a portrait of Mao Zedong—an incident that led to a presumption of guilt and ultimately to his execution.

=== Tibetan Medicine ===
According to Craig R. Janes, during the Cultural Revolution many Tibetan doctors were labeled as "class enemies." They were subjected to particularly harsh treatment, sent to labor camps, and forbidden to practice medicine. By 1973, Tibetan medicine had almost completely disappeared.

According to Mona Schrempf, Tibetan medicine continued to be taught and practiced during the Cultural Revolution, but under compromised conditions: private practice and instruction were eliminated or carried out only in secret, while formal education was stripped of its links to religious practice and medical theory. During this period, the generation of Tibetan doctors trained in state institutions did not have access to education in the traditional Tibetan medical system—a fact that still affects current generations of students.

According to Yeshi Donden, the removal of the spiritual aspects of the medical tradition continued at least until 1989.

== Famine ==
According to Pierre-Antoine Donnet, famine reappeared in Tibet during the Cultural Revolution. In central Tibet, by 1970 there were more than 1,000 people's communes, each grouping 100 to 200 families. By December 1995, there were around 2,000 across nearly all counties of central Tibet (Ü-Tsang). Within these communes, Chinese cadres imposed the cultivation of wheat and annual cropping, whereas Tibetans traditionally grew barley—better suited to the fragile soils of the Tibetan plateau—and alternated harvest years with fallow years to allow the land to recover. This led to soil exhaustion, poor harvests, and a significant decline in grain production, depleting what had been Tibet's grain reserves before 1950 and causing new severe famines in some regions. This situation was worsened by the war preparations initiated by Mao Zedong in the late 1960s. The Chinese army was given priority in grain distribution, even in Tibet, where several hundred thousand soldiers were stationed along the borders with India. In addition, the Chinese government sent tens of thousands of Chinese settlers to Tibet during the Cultural Revolution; in central Tibet, large-scale migration effectively began around 1975.

According to the Tibetan Youth Congress, toward the end of the Cultural Revolution in 1976, tens of thousands of Tibetans died of hunger in Ü-Tsang due to overcultivation of land planted with wheat.

According to testimony by Gyeten Namgyal, during the Cultural Revolution, those without work simply died of starvation.

== Impunity ==
According to Tsering Shakya, unlike in mainland China—where the Chinese Communist Party purged individuals responsible for crimes committed during the Cultural Revolution—this did not occur in Tibet, despite calls from figures such as the 10th Panchen Lama. In 1984, in his speech at the Second Tibet Work Forum, Hu Yaobang mentioned demands for the expulsion of such individuals; however, they instead received promotions, with promises that they could be reformed. For Tsering Shakya, the Chinese Communist Party was unable to find other trustworthy individuals to govern Tibet, with China facing there the kinds of problems typical of a colonial power.

== See also ==
- Sinicization of Tibet

== Bibliography ==
=== Works in French ===
- Anne-Marie Blondeau and Katia Buffetrille (eds.), Is Tibet Chinese?, collective work, Albin Michel, "Sciences des religions", 2002, ISBN 2226134263.
- Marie-Claire Bergère, China from 1949 to the Present Day, A. Colin, 2000, ISBN 2200251238 / ISBN 9782200251239.
- Fox Butterfield, China: Alive in the Bitter Sea, Paris: Presses de la Cité, 1983, ISBN 2258012279 / ISBN 9782258012271.
- Laurent Deshayes, History of Tibet, Fayard, 1997, ISBN 9782213595023.
- Pierre-Antoine Donnet, Tibet: Dead or Alive, Gallimard, 1990; expanded ed. 1993, ISBN 9782070719181.
- Patrick French, Tibet, Tibet: A Personal History of a Lost Land, 2003 (French translation: Tibet, Tibet: A Personal History of a Lost Land, Albin Michel, 2005).
- Palden Gyatso, Fire Under the Snow, Actes Sud, 1997, ISBN 2742713581.
- Gilles Van Grasdorff, The New History of Tibet, Perrin, October 2006, ISBN 2262021392.
- Thomas Laird with the Dalai Lama, The Story of Tibet: Conversations with the Dalai Lama, Plon, 2007 (trans. Christophe Mercier), ISBN 2259198910.
- Michel Peissel, The Horsemen of Kham: Secret War in Tibet, Robert Laffont, Paris, 1972.
- Kim Yeshi, Tibet: History of a Tragedy, La Martinière, February 2009, ISBN 9782732437002.
- Woeser, Forbidden Memory: Testimonies on the Cultural Revolution in Tibet, translated by Li Zhang and Bernard Bourrit, Gallimard, 2010, ISBN 2070131157.

=== Works in English ===
- Dreyer, J. (1968) 'China's Minority Nationalities in the Cultural Revolution', The China Quarterly, 35, pp. 96–109. doi: 10.1017/S0305741000032124.
- Mongolia, In. "Tibet." Persia and Afghanistan, in Caucasia and.
- Heaslet, Juliana Pennington. "The Red Guards: Instruments of Destruction in the Cultural Revolution." Asian Survey 12, no. 12 (1972): 1032–047. doi:10.2307/2643022.
- Barnett, Robert, and Shirin Akiner. Resistance and reform in Tibet. Motilal Banarsidass Published, 1996.
- Heath, John B. Tibet and China in the twenty-first century: non-violence versus state power. Saqi Books, 2005.
- Melvyn C. Goldstein, Ben Jiao, and Lhundrup Tanzen, On the Cultural Revolution in Tibet: The Nyemo Incident of 1969, University of California Press, 2009, ISBN 0520256824.
- Mobo C. F. Gao, Battle for China's Past: Mao and the Cultural Revolution, London and Ann Arbor, Pluto Press, 2008, ISBN 9780745327808.
- Dawa Norbu, Tibet: The Road Ahead, Rider & Co, 1998, ISBN 9780712671965.
- Smith, Warren W. "The nationalities policy of the Chinese Communist Party and the socialist transformation of Tibet." Resistance and Reform in Tibet (1994): 51–75.
- Sperling, Elliot. "Tibet and China: The interpretation of history since 1950." China Perspectives 3 (2009): 25.
- Yeh, Emily T. "Modernity, Memory And Agricultural Modernisation In Central Tibet, 1950–1980." Proceedings of the Tenth Seminar of the IATS, 2003. Volume 11: Tibetan Modernities. Brill, 2008.
