= Tsering Shakya =

Tibetan scholar

Tsering Wangdu Shakya (Tibetan: ཚེ་རིང་དབང་འདུས་ཤཱཀྱ་, Wylie: Tshe-ring Dbang-'dus Shaakya) (born 1959) is a historian and scholar on Tibetan literature and modern Tibet and its relationship with China. He is currently Canadian Research Chair in Religion and Contemporary Society in Asia at the Institute of Asian Research at the School of Public Policy and Global Affairs, University of British Columbia where he teaches in the Master of Public Policy and Global Affairs (MPPGA) program, and also works for Radio Free Asia.

== Early life ==
Shakya was born in Lhasa, Tibet in 1959, the youngest child in his family. His father, headmaster of a small Tibetan school, died when he was little. His family was divided after the Cultural Revolution erupted in 1966. A brother and a sister were staunch leftists, but another brother was imprisoned for opposing the revolution. In 1967, his mother left Tibet for Nepal with Shakya and another daughter. They settled in northern India, where Shakya attended a Tibetan school in Mussoorie.

== Education and career ==
- B.A. Hons, (1981) Social Anthropology & South Asian History, SOAS, University of London
- M.Phil. (2000) Tibetan Studies. SOAS, University of London. Thesis: Dondrup Gyal and the Search for Tibetan Modernism: A Study of Dondrup Gyal’s Literary Works
- Ph.D. (2004) Tibetan Studies. School of Oriental & African Studies (SOAS), University of London, Thesis: The Emergence of Modern Tibetan Literature Since 1950

He convened the first International Conference on Modern Tibet Studies in 1990 at School of Oriental and African Studies. He taught at the Centre of Refugee Studies at the University of Oxford. From 1999 to 2002 he was a research fellow in Tibetan Studies at the School of Oriental and African Studies at the University of London.

== Selected publications ==
- Shakya, Tsering W.; Harris, Clare (2003), Seeing Lhasa: British Depictions of the Tibetan Capital 1936-1947, London: Serindia
- Shakya, Tsering W. (1999), The Dragon in the Land of Snows: A History of Modern Tibet Since 1947, London: Pimlico
- Gyatso, Palden; Shakya, Tsering W. (1998), Fire Under the Snow: The Testimony of a Tibetan Prisoner (Palden Gyatso), London: Harvill Press
