= Duodi Hydropower Station =

Hydropower station in Tibet, China

Duodi Hydropower Station 夺底水电站
- Interactive map of Duodi Hydropower Station 夺底水电站
- Country: China
- Location: in the northern suburbs of Lhasa
- Purpose: power
- Construction began: 1925

The Duodi Hydropower Station (Chinese: 夺底水电站), also called as Duodigou Hydropower Station (夺底沟水电站), is the first hydropower station in Tibet and the second in China, which was destroyed by a flood and shut down in 1946 and rebuilt in October 1956.

Duodi Hydropower Station is located in the northern suburbs of Lhasa, with a total installed capacity of 660 kilowatts. The hydropower station was commented by some Chinese writers as "the scientific light of Tibet under the theocracy".

== History ==
The Duodi Hydropower Station began preparations for construction in 1925, officially started construction in 1927. In 1928, the hydropower station was completed to generate electricity, and Chang Ngopa Rinzin Dorje (强俄巴·仁增多吉) was responsible for production and operation management. At that time, there were only 8 employees in the power station.

The equipment of plant was imported from the United Kingdom by the Gaxag Government in Tibet, with a total installed capacity of 92 kilowatts, mainly for the Gaxag Government, mint and the nobility.

Since 1943, the hydropower station due to the aging of the unit, could not operate normally. In the meantime, Chang Ngopa Rinzin Dorje had applied to the Gaxag Government for the purchase of higher-power generators and accessories, and asked for investment in the expansion of the diversion channel of the plant to increase the power station citation flow, but the government did not give approval.
