= International Campaign for Tibet =

Non-profit advocacy organization

- ICT's logo
- Founded: March 15, 1988
- Founders: Tenzin Namgyal Tethong; Lodi Gyari
- Type: Non-profit 501(c)(3) charitable corporation
- Tax ID no.: 52-1570071
- Purpose: Human rights in Tibet
- Location(s): Washington D.C. Offices in Amsterdam, Brussels and Berlin; Field Office in Dharamshala
- Chairman: Richard Gere
- President: Tencho Gyatso
- Website: www.savetibet.org www.savetibet.nl www.savetibet.de

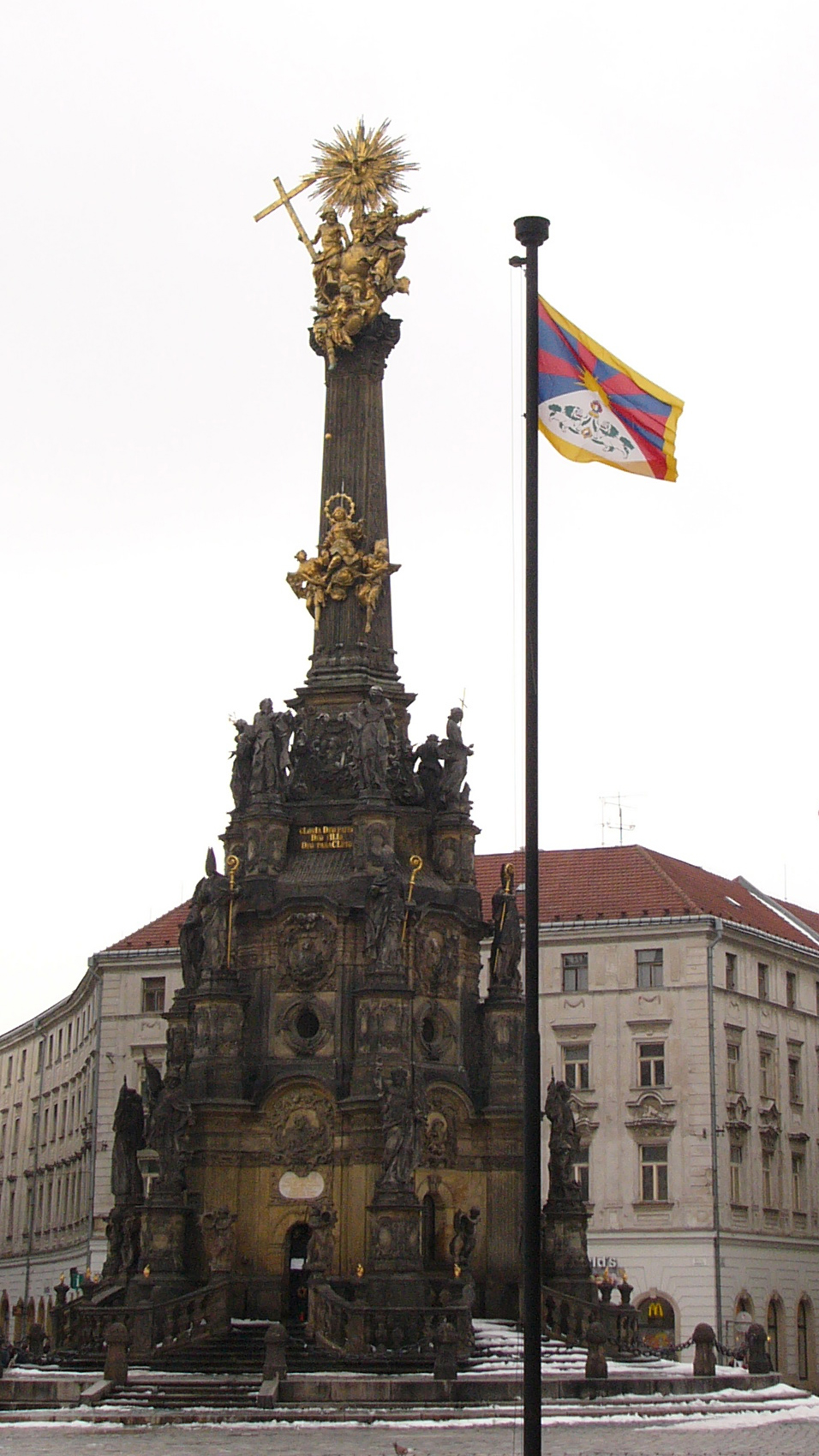
Flag of Tibet flown at the Holy Trinity Column in Olomouc, Czech Republic, on 10 March 2006 at the 47th anniversary of the 1959 Tibetan uprising

The International Campaign for Tibet (ICT) is a non-profit advocacy group working to promote democratic freedoms for Tibetans, ensure their human rights, and protect Tibetan culture and the environment. Founded in 1988, ICT is the world's largest Tibet-related NGO, with several thousand members and strong bases of support in North America and Europe. On March 15, 2018, the ICT marked 30 years and received a video message from the Dalai Lama.

The International Campaign for Tibet works to promote self-determination, human rights, and democratic freedoms for the Tibetan people, and negotiations between the 14th Dalai Lama and the People's Republic of China.

ICT is a member of International Federation for Human Rights.

== History ==
The group was founded in 1988.

An event was also held in the United States Congress on March 6, 2018, to mark the event with Congressional leaders Nancy Pelosi, Ileana Ros-Lehtinen and Jim McGovern.

ICT maintains offices in Washington, D.C., Amsterdam, Brussels and Berlin. ICT's work focuses on three main areas: reporting on the situation inside Tibet, advocating for Tibet with governments, and reaching out to Chinese individuals, organizations, and media entities.

== Activities ==
Monitoring and reporting on human rights, environmental and socio-economic conditions in Tibet makes up a significant portion of ICT's activities, with information coming directly from inside Tibet and also from a network of Tibetan researchers based in India and Nepal.

ICT advocacy efforts are focused on securing humanitarian and development assistance for Tibetans, and working with governments to develop policies and programs to help Tibetans. It organizes activities like the annual Tibet Lobby Day which gives constituents a chance to directly ask their representatives to help Tibet.

== Rowell Fund ==
Following the August 2002 deaths of ICT Co-chair Galen Rowell and his wife, Barbara Rowell, the ICT Board of Directors established the Rowell Fund. The Fund gives small grants to Tibetans whose projects deal with the environment/conservation, photography, humanitarian projects, journalism/literature, and women's projects. In recent years the amount dispensed by the Rowell Fund has ranged from $35,000 to more than $40,000.

== Light of Truth Award ==
ICT presents the Light of Truth Award, a human rights award to individuals and institutions who have made significant contributions to the public understanding of Tibet and the fight for human rights and democratic freedoms of the Tibetan people. The award itself is a simple Tibetan butter lamp, symbolizing the extraordinary light that each recipient has drawn to the Tibet issue. On one occasion, in 2001, the award was presented to all the people of India, with president R. Venkataraman accepting delivery of the prize. The majority of the awards have been presented since 1995 by the fourteenth Dalai Lama, Tenzin Gyatso, to the recipients personally. The recipients are:

- 1995: A. M. Rosenthal
- 1996: Richard Gere, Lavinia Currier, and Michael Currier
- 1997: Charlie Rose, and Claiborne Pell
- 1998: Martin Scorsese, and Melissa Mathison
- 1999: Hugh Edward Richardson, and Danielle Mitterrand
- 2000: Richard C. Blum
- 2001: The people of India, taken delivery of by R. Venkataraman
- 2002: Heinrich Harrer, and Petra Kelly
- 2003: Benjamin A. Gilman, Michele Bohana, and Robert Thurman
- 2004: Otto Graf Lambsdorff, Irmtraut Wäger, and Václav Havel
- 2005: Elie Wiesel, Carl Gershman, and Lowell Thomas Jr.
- 2006: Hergé Foundation, and Desmond Tutu
- 2009: Julia Taft, and Wang Lixiong
- 2011: George Patterson
- 2013: Professor Dr. Christian Schwarz-Schilling, The International Commission of Jurists, Ms. Sigrid Joss-Arnd, Professor Theo van Boven and Robert Ford
- 2018: Grace Spring
- 2024: Nancy Pelosi

== See also ==
- Voice of Tibet (Norway)
