= Conservation and restoration of Tibetan thangkas =

Preservation of Tibetan scroll paintings

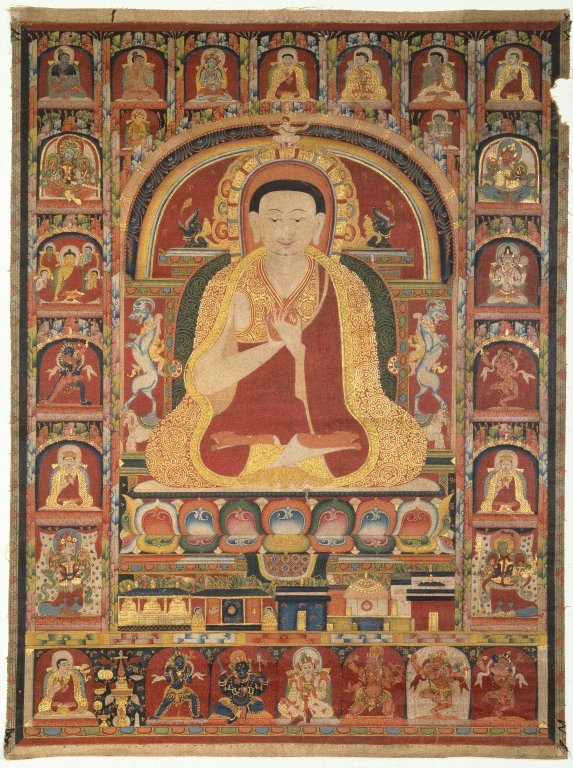
Brooklyn Museum - Portrait of the Great Thangpa

The conservation and restoration of Tibetan thangkas is the physical preservation of the traditional religious Tibetan painting form known as a thangka (also spelled as "tangka" or "thanka"). When applied to thangkas of significant cultural heritage, this activity is generally undertaken by a conservator-restorer.

Thangkas are scroll painting that are vertical in format, usually in a size that is easy rolled up, often about half to one and a half meters high, although large thangkas for special ceremonies can require dozens of people to unroll and display them. Like religious wall paintings, thangkas are considered to function as intermediaries between the mortal and divine worlds.

The thangka started off as a traditional Nepalese art form. This form was originally exported to Tibet after Princess Bhrikuti of Nepal married Songtsän Gampo. In the early days, these painted scrolls became very popular with travelling monks because of their portability. During the Ming (1368–1644) and Qing (1644–1912) Dynasties, the painting of thangkas flourished in Tibet.

== Ethical considerations ==
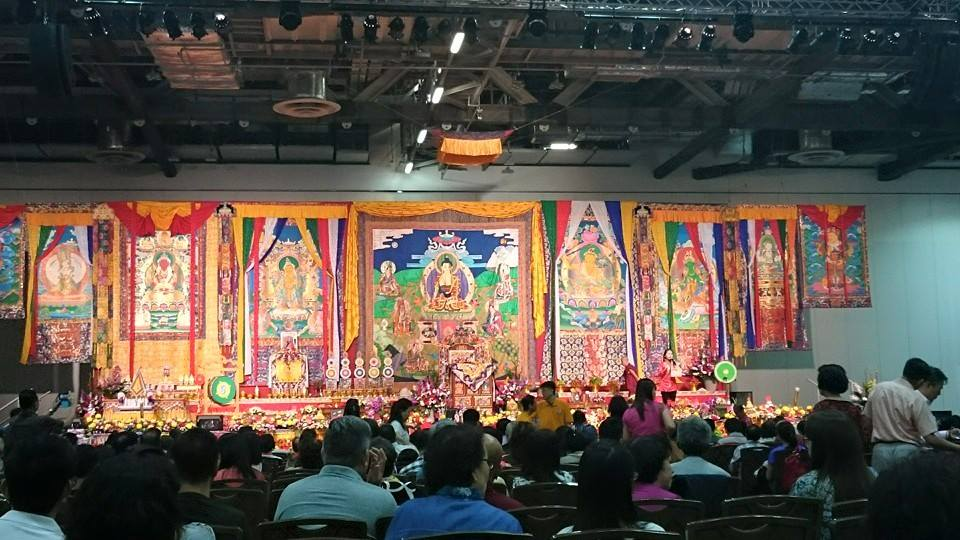
Thangkas on the wall during a Tibetan Buddhist puja

Some early conservation treatment of thangkas involved the following well-intentioned mistakes:

1. removed and discarded the mounting altogether and treated the painting with methods appropriate for a Western oil painting; including matting and framing the painting in a Western aesthetic
2. removed and discarded the mounting and treated the painting with methods appropriate for a Chinese or Japanese scroll painting on silk or paper, then mounted the painting in a scroll-painting aesthetic
3. left the painting in the mounting and lined it in-situ with a method appropriate for a Western-style painting
4. in-painted without an understanding of the iconography or original painting methods
5. left the painting in place in the mounting and trimmed the top and bottom dowels off, then framed the entire thangka in a traditional Western-style frame
6. removed and discarded the cover
7. given every mounting a strong chemical treatment for bacterial growth, when perhaps mild cleaning, airing, and proper display and storage would have sufficed
8. lined the paintings with an aqueous adhesive mixture of animal glue and wheat flour, risking moisture penetrating the ground and paint layers from behind.

Before undertaking conservation, it is important for conservators to take into consideration the iconographic content and social significance. Ideally, no aspect of the treatment must compromise the original purpose of the object. To acquire and apply this attitude of respect requires extensive research into the cultural significance of the object to be treated and the materials and methods of its construction. Such research requires informants from the culture, both artists and religious authorities. Conservators need also to recognize that the brocade and the mounting technique are integral to the piece, and must retain these elements as much as possible.

== Different types of thangkas ==
Traditional painted Thangkas were composed using mineral and vegetable pigments in a hide glue medium, with silk brocade borders becoming common during the early Ming and Qing period. Contemporary Thangkas are typically painted in gouache on cotton fabric.

Apart from the typical paint on cotton fabric thangkas, the following types of thangkas were also available:

1. The dpar ma, woodblock printed thangka that is produced on a canvas. A wood block is engraved with the painting outline before printed onto the canvas. This simplifies the painting process and gives special effects.
2. The metal thangka, whose durability and foldable concept was to serve travelling needs.
3. The Papier-mâché thangka which is unique for the three-dimensional appearance of the central picture.
4. The tshen drub ma, embroidered thangka which is typically executed in the far eastern part of Tibet and China for trade export.
5. The woven thangka. This form of thangka was created in the post-1950s period due to the lack of traditional thangka-painting artists at that time.
6. The dras-drab-ma, gos-sku, appliqué thangka which consists of many single pieces of cloth in a thangka.

== Typical damages to thangkas ==
=== Physical and mechanical damage ===
The thangka is devised to be conveniently rolled for transportation and this is a source of physical and mechanical damage. Rolling compresses and abrades the surface and abrasion is aggravated when the cover is missing. It is not an easy task to roll it with all its different components and more so if it is distorted. Moreover, the various components of the thangka rarely have the same composition or thickness. Consequently, when it is rolled, the pressure is unequal on all the parts which results in the occurrence of folds and creases. These folds and creases are destructive because they form areas of weakness. Large thangkas are at higher risk of such damage.

The most susceptible element of these multi-media painted scrolls is their cloth borders, often made of silk brocade. The silk is vulnerable and quickly weakened by the damp walls of the monastery, the weight of the painting, and the weight of the heavy bottom rod, which easily fractures the cloth borders, especially with the repeated rolling and unrolling of the paintings for display. The borders are typically the first of the complex structure to fail.

The condition is further aggravated by thangka construction. The weight difference between the central picture and the borders, and the weight of the heavy bottom rod, creates tension from all directions. Repeated rolling and unrolling further enhance the extent of fractures. Thangkas are constructed by stitching, which creates potential areas of weakness because the fabric is pierced and compressed. When stitching threads degrade more rapidly than the fabric, the overall fragility in the structure is increased. The tension caused by weight differences between the central picture and the borders, the weight of the heavy bottom rod, further enhance the extent of fractures.

The borders are usually the first to fail, as they get separated from each other and from the central picture; losses in borders are common and original borders are rare. The upper borders are usually at highest risk. Creasing in the lining has been observed as well; the main cause has been suggested to be due to the dimension of the lining being greater than the thangka, which may be an original concept in thangka construction.

=== Display conditions ===
When thangkas are on display in their original Tibetan settings, they were exposed to soot and airborne debris from burning butter lamp and incense. Although butter or oil was sometimes spread over the painted thangka in an attempt to preserve it, the accumulation of dirt and grease darkens the surface and can obliterate the image and the colors beneath. Besides being difficult to remove, the presence of butter or oil in the fibers accelerate fiber degradation.

=== Damp conditions ===
The source of dampness can be relative humidity, water in the walls, sprinkled holy water, or water in the adhesive materials used during treatment. Water damage may show up as bleeding of colours, leaving tidelines. The different materials on the thangkas respond differently to changes in relative humidity, and therefore causing dimensional stresses and distortion.

=== Light ===
There are three types of light: ultraviolet (UV) light, infrared radiation and visible light. All three types are harmful to artifacts and the damage caused by all light is cumulative and irreversible. Exposure to light in all forms causes a chemical reaction to happen within the molecular level of an artifact. Light exposure can cause textiles to weaken and fade, dyes and paints to darken or change color, and paper to become weak, bleached, yellowed or darkened.

Therefore, thangkas are chemically and physically altered when exposed to light. The ultraviolet in light hastens fibre and dye degradation through photo-oxidation.

=== Pests ===
Pests can cause severe damage to thangkas. Animal pests such rats and birds can physically attack thangkas for food or nesting materials or soil them with droppings. Insect pests are commonly found on thangkas because of the organic nature of these scroll paintings. Mould grows easily on cellulosic fabrics, decomposing them and the attack can easily spread to other textiles. Tell-tale signs of mould damage include musty odour, presence of black or white powdery growth, yellow or multi-coloured stains, and condensation.

=== Losses ===
Often the veils, ribbons and mountings, or rods have been lost. Some possible explanations are that they were discarded when they become severely deteriorated and were not replaced. But there are also times when they were intentionally removed. The mounting may be removed to enable transport out of the country. Dealers or collectors or the museum sometimes remove them for particular reasons.

== Conservation treatments ==
Prior to conducting conservation treatments, conservators should always conduct scientific investigation on the original materials used. The conservator is responsible for choosing materials and methods appropriate to the objectives of each specific treatment and consistent with currently accepted practice. The advantages of the materials and methods chosen must be balanced against their potential adverse effects on future examination, scientific investigation, treatment, and function. Conservator should also ensure the treatment procedures and materials used are properly documented.

The following details typical treatment methods for thangkas:

=== Separation ===
The original sewing used to attach the thangka to the textile border was carefully unpicked and retain the original sewing thread. This is to separate the thangka paintings (typically done in paper) with their textile borders, and ensure that each component is properly treated with a suitable procedure.

=== Removal of previous repair stitching ===
The purpose was to remove damaging and disfiguring repair on the thangka and its lining. By doing this, re-stitching of vulnerable areas could be done.

=== Surface clean ===
Cleaning can improve the aesthetics of the thangka and aid its interpretation, which may be difficult when dirt accumulates. Besides, removal of soiling facilitates good contact and bonding between the silk and support in the adhesive treatment. It will also reduce the risk of further soiling penetration into the silk during humidification.

=== Humidification ===
Humidification introduces moisture in the form of water vapour into the thangka to relax the fibers quickly. It is then followed by drying and flattening under precisely controlled conditions such as sandwiching the thangka between sheets of a blotting material and under fairly heavy weight to prevent cockling.

=== Pest eradication ===
Pests infestations such as beetles and frass are common in thangka due to its organic nature. A common method for removing pests are fumigation with nitrogen in a Controlled Atmosphere Treatment (CAT).

This gas creates an asphyxiation effect on the target insect pests such as cloth moth (Tineola sp.), silverfish (Lepisma saccharina) and other textile pests. This fumigation method is known as CAT (Controlled Atmosphere Treatment) and is widely use in the conservation of antiques, artifacts and valuable books.

=== Relining ===
When the original support/fabric of the components is too weak, brittle or torn, unable to serve its purpose, it will be necessary to support a structurally unsound thangka.

It would be necessary to take into account the spiritual character of the thangka and to maintain the possibility of a religious traditional use, thus allowing for a traditional vertical display. The relining had to be flexible enough to allow rolling and unrolling, even if this would not necessarily be the case after treatment. It also had to allow visual access to the back, to read the inscription which is part of the consecration of the thangka and confers its spiritual presence.

=== Loss compensation ===
Certain losses can disrupt one's ability to interpret the thangka or appreciate it. Ethically loss compensation and/or total replacement has been done to safeguard the design or the form of the art. It aims to preserve the significance and values that have been diminished by losses. This is where conceptual integrity takes precedence over material integrity .

However, conservators must ensure any intervention to compensate for loss should be detectable by common examination methods. Such compensation should be reversible and should not falsely modify the known aesthetic, conceptual, and physical characteristics of the cultural property, especially by removing or obscuring original material.

=== Mounting ===
The mounting is an inherent part of the thangka. And as it is important both structurally and symbolically, an attempt is always made to save it. It may be possible to ascertain if the current mounting is, in fact, the original by close examination of the edges of the main panel. The presence of several rows of stitch holes can indicate that the mounting has been changed.

If the original mounting is no longer suitable to be reuse, conservators can seek similar design textile borders or silk brocades and dye it to the same color as the original. The color and design of textile borders and silk brocades plays an important role in complementing the thangka painting.

=== Preventive conservation ===
Prevention is better than cure. The factors that aggravate deterioration have been considered and favorable conditions for preservation and measures for protection against future damage have been instigated. The following are preventive measures for the care of thangkas:

1. The use of two thick ribbons, slightly shorter than the thangka, stitched to the ends of both rods on the reverse side of the thangka, to prevent the lower rod from straining the thangka.
2. The rolling of the thangka to be done on a flat surface and not in hanging position to minimise creasing, rolling carefully but firmly on the lower rod.
3. The practice of display rotation as opposed to permanent displays, in order to achieve long term preservation. This has been justified on the grounds that it is usual practice in temple or monastery to put the thangka on only on special occasions and that such practice in effect preserved the thangka.
4. The use of showcases to prevent the accumulation of dirt.
5. The use of appropriate lighting and light levels.
6. The provision of handling instructions, condition checklist and display recommendations such as restrictions on traditional sprinkling of water to minimize the problems.
7. Use of inert materials for storage and display.

== Storage methods ==
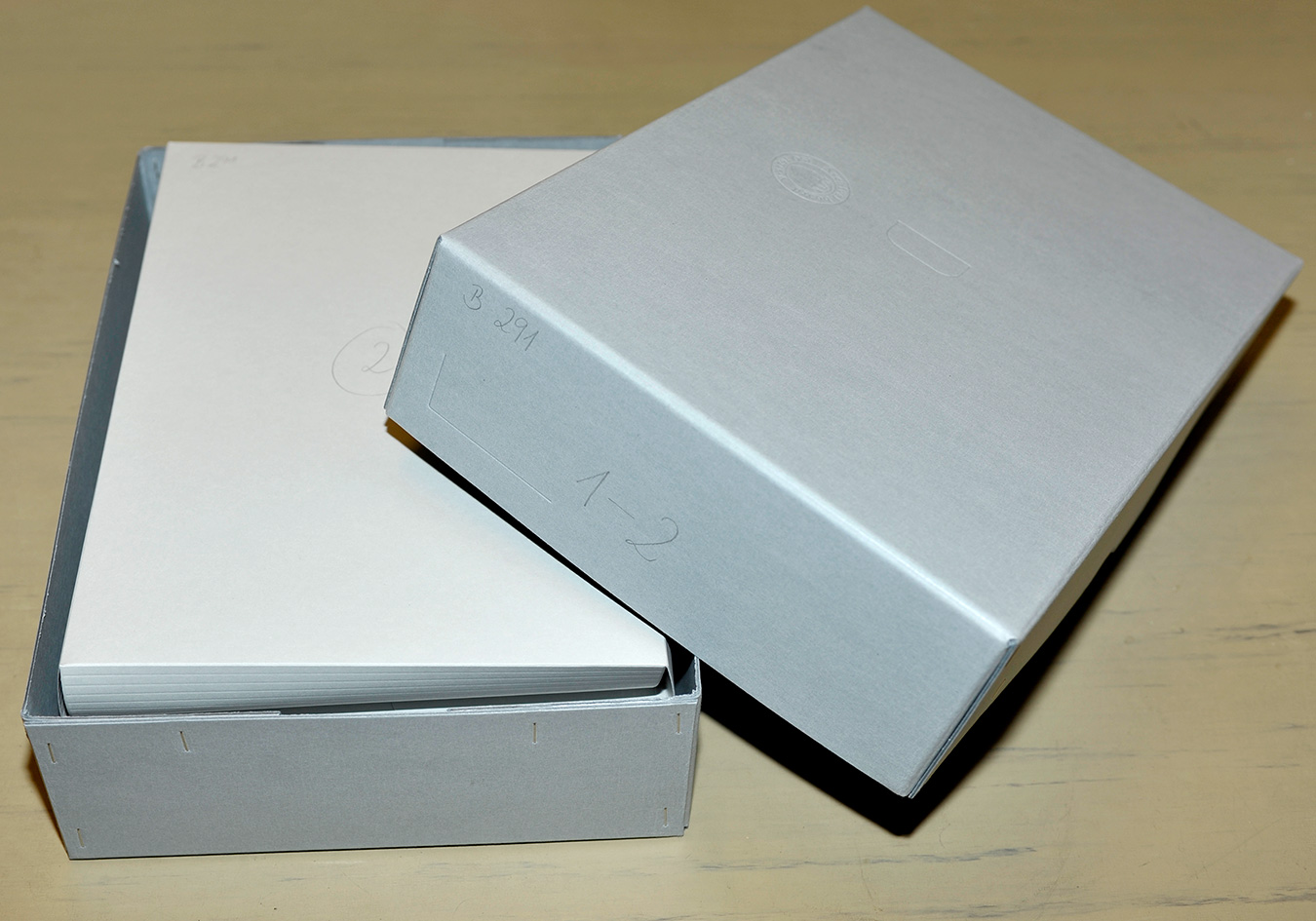
Archival box

Storage for long-term preservation has also been developed with the consideration of the various needs of the thangka. The following are some of the recommendations.

1. Storage of thangkas individually in flat position archival grade boxes lined with acid-free paper.
2. Ensure micro-climate in storage place is suitable such as through the use of silica gel.
3. Rolled on dowels with 2" of soft padding. The soft padding is to accommodate cockles in the painting, and large diameter to reduce the curvature of the rolled painting. The dowels are suspended in clam shell archival boxes so that the weight of the thangka is not carried by parts of the painting. The clam shell boxes protect the thangkas from dust, light and pressure and allow efficient use of storage space.
4. Ensure storage conditions are clean from pests and mould.
5. Ensure the storage location temperature is kept constant at approximately 24 °C (75 °F).

== Case studies ==
=== Akshobhya Buddha in his Abhirati Heaven thanka by Julie Goldman ===
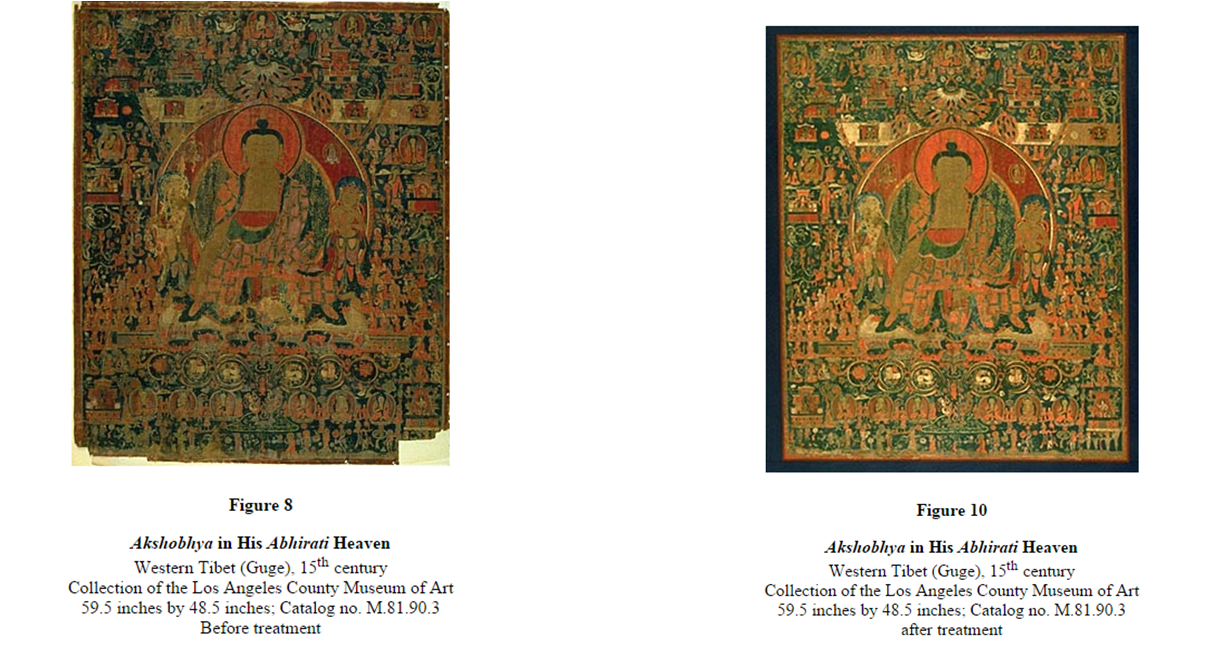
15th century Thangka restoration

- Ashobhya Buddha in his Eastern Pure Land of Abhirati Heaven Thankga
- Museum: LACMA
- For exhibition: Tibet Wisdom and Compassion: The Sacred Art of Tibet
- Treatment for piece:
1. Surface cleaning
2. Humidification to remove creases due to the initial rolled storage method
3. Losses were meant (but not painted in)
4. Change the cotton support to an adapted Japanese-style drying board a karibari
5. Adding new silk borders dyed to match its initial colors.

=== Ajita thangka and the Hva Shang thangka by Mike Wheeler and Teresa Heady ===
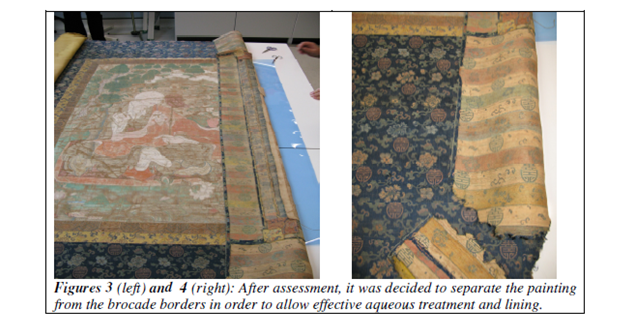
Separation of the thangka from original textile

- Ajita thangka and the Hva Shang thangka
- Museum: National Museum of Ireland
- Treatment described:
1. Separation of thangka painting from original brocade
2. Treatment of the paintings entailed prior humidification in a Sympatex® sandwich followed by washing on blotting paper which had been moistened with de-ionised water
3. Sprayed with a 50:50 mixture of water and ethanol to help minimise the likelihood of tidelines occurring and to help break down any surface tension which might impede the cleaning process
4. Lining thangkas with Japanese Sekishu paper and wheat starch paste to give it strength.
5. Drying on a karibari board
6. Attached painting back to brocade
