= Light of Truth Award =

Human rights award presented by the International Campaign for Tibet

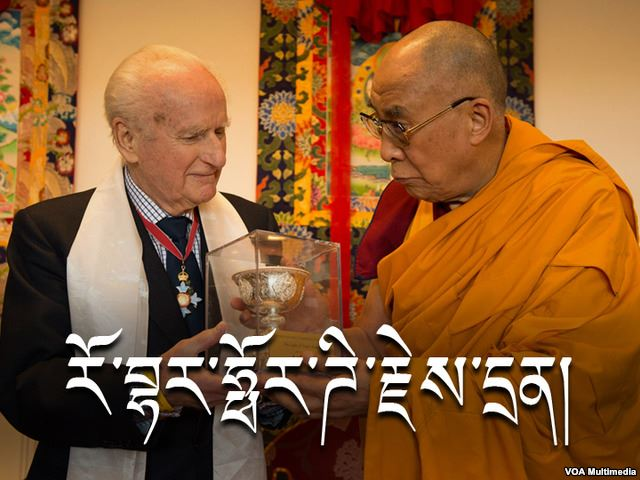
- Robert Ford with the Dalai Lama
- Date: 2013
- Presented by: International Campaign for Tibet, 14th Dalai Lama
- Website: https://savetibet.org/what-we-do/light-of-truth-awards/

The Light of Truth Award is a human rights award which is presented nearly annually by the International Campaign for Tibet (ICT), an NGO aiming for the promotion of democracy and human rights for the Tibetan people. The award is presented since 1995 by the fourteenth Dalai Lama, Tenzin Gyatso, to the recipients personally.

The prize consists of a humble Tibetan butter lamp that serves as a symbol of the extraordinary light that every recipient brought to Tibet. In 2005 the ICT received an award itself, the Geuzenpenning, a human rights award from the Netherlands.

The Light of Truth Award is granted to persons and organizations that have publicly contributed substantially to the rise of and battle for human rights and democratic freedoms of the Tibetan people. In 2001, the award was presented to the entire people of India, and accepted for them by president R. Venkataraman.

== Recipients ==
- 1995: A. M. Rosenthal
- 1996: Richard Gere, Lavinia Currier, and Michael Currier
- 1997: Charlie Rose and Claiborne Pell
- 1998: Martin Scorsese and Melissa Mathison
- 1999: Hugh Edward Richardson, and Danielle Mitterrand
- 2000: Richard C. Blum
- 2001: The people of India, taken delivery of by R. Venkataraman
- 2002: Heinrich Harrer and Petra Kelly
- 2003: Benjamin A. Gilman, Michele Bohana, and Robert Thurman
- 2004: Otto Graf Lambsdorff, Irmtraut Wäger, and Václav Havel
- 2005: Elie Wiesel, Carl Gershman, and Lowell Thomas, Jr.
- 2006: Hergé Foundation and Desmond Tutu
- 2009: Julia Taft and Wang Lixiong
- 2011: George Patterson
- 2013: Robert Ford, International Commission of Jurists, Sigrid Joss-Arnd, Christian Schwarz-Schilling, and Theo van Boven
- 2024: Nancy Pelosi
