= United Nations General Assembly Resolution 60/147 =

UN General Assembly Resolution 60/147
- Date: 16 December 2005
- Code: A/RES/60/147 (Document)
- Subject: Reparation for Victims of International Human Rights Violations
- Voting summary: 40 voted for; None voted against; 12 abstained
- Result: adopted

UN General Assembly Resolution 60/147, the Basic Principles and Guidelines on the Right to a Remedy and Reparation for Victims of Gross Violations of International Human Rights Law and Serious Violations of International Humanitarian Law, is a United Nations Resolution about the rights of victims of international crimes. It was adopted by the General Assembly on 16 December 2005 in its 60th session. According to the preamble, the purpose of the Resolution is to assist victims and their representatives to remedial relief and to guide and encourage States in the implementation of public policies on reparations.

The principles were drafted by Dutch jurist Theo van Boven, who served as the UN's Special Rapporteur on the Right to Reparation to Victims of Gross Violations of Human Rights from 1986 to 1991, and were finalised after over 20 years of research. They have since been adopted by UN Member States. They are non-binding, however it has been recommended by the General Assembly that States take the Basic Principles and Guidelines into account.

The Resolution consists of 27 principles outlining the obligation of all UN member states to respect and implement international human rights law and international humanitarian law. It is the first codification of the rights of victims of human rights violations to reparation and remedies, and to access justice within domestic legal systems.

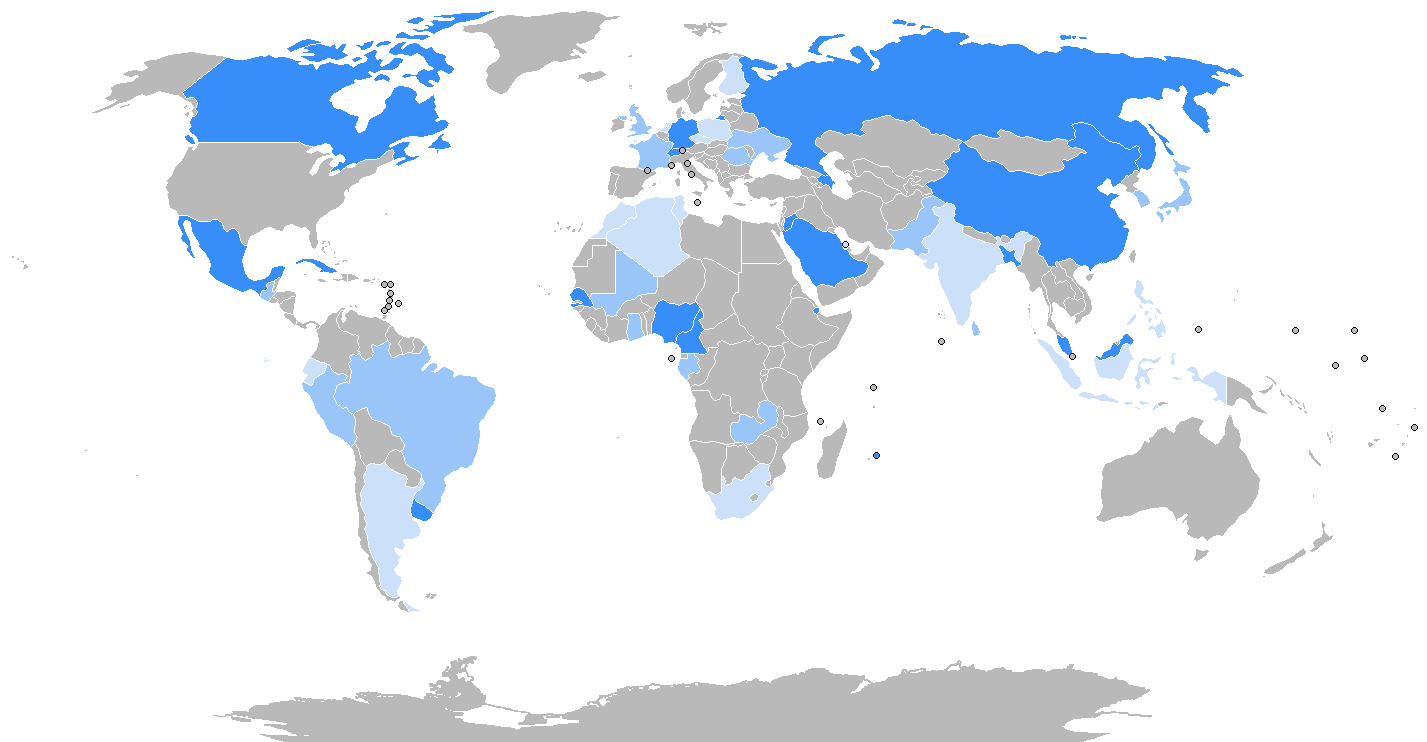
Members of the United Nations Human Rights Council (UNHRC), 2007-2009

== Description ==
The Basic Principles and Guidelines prescribe that victims of human rights abuses have a right to reparation. This right derives from the general principle of the law on State Responsibility that a wrongful act arising from a breach of an international obligation gives rise to an obligation to make reparation. The recognition of a right to reparation extends from the duty of States to remedy wrongful acts under international law, an obligation codified in Article 34 of the Draft Articles on State Responsibility for Internationally Wrongful Acts(2001).

The Resolution combines the rights afforded under both international humanitarian law and international human rights law, and codifies the duty of States to implement domestic reparations for victims. It addresses gross violations of international human rights law and serious violations of international humanitarian law that constitute crimes under international law. Its provisions concern the status and treatment of victims of such violations and their remedial rights under international law, including the right to receive reparation for harm suffered. It also specifies statutes of limitations in relation to such violations, access to justice and access to relevant information concerning violations and reparation mechanisms.

The Basic Principles and Guidelines are not intended to create new obligations. They are intended to serve as a tool/guiding instrument for States in implementing domestic policies.

== Background ==
61st sitting of the Human Rights Commission: Votes of UN Member States
For	Against	Abstain
1. Argentina; 2. Armenia; 3. Bhutan; 4. Brazil; 5. Burkina Faso; 6. Canada; 7. China; 8. Congo; 9. Costa Rica; 10. Cuba; 11. Dominican Republic; 12. Ecuador; 13. Finland; 14. France; 15. Gabon; 16. Guatemala; 17. Guinea; 18. Honduras; 19. Hungary; 20. Indonesia; 21. Ireland; 22. Italy; 23. Japan; 24. Kenya; 25. Malaysia; 26. Mexico; 27. Netherlands; 28. Nigeria; 29. Pakistan; 30. Paraguay; 31. Peru; 32. South Korea; 33. Romania; 34. Russian Federation; 35. South Africa; 36. Sri Lanka; 37. Swaziland; 38. Ukraine; 39. United Kingdom; 40. Zimbabwe	None	1. Australia; 2. Egypt; 3. Eritrea; 4. Germany; 5. India; 6. Mauritania; 7. Nepal; 8. Qatar; 9. Saudi Arabia; 10. Sudan; 11. Togo; 12. United States of America

The first draft of the Basic Principles and Guidelines was prepared by Theo van Boven in 1997, at the request by the Sub-Commission on the Prevention of Discrimination and Protection of Minorities. After incorporating extensive feedback and further research, the 2000 Draft Principles and Guidelines were presented to the Commission on Human Rights, and subsequently circulated to state governments as well as non-governmental organisations for comment.

On 31 August 2000, the basic principles and guidelines were open for comment, and the Secretary-General invited member states to submit feedback. Between 2000 and 2002, the document underwent further revision.

In August 2003, an international consultation was held by the Office of the United Nations High Commissioner for Human Rights (OHCHR), at the request of the Commission on Human Rights, for the purpose of finalising the text. A revised version was produced, which incorporated feedback from State governments and NGO's, as well as expert and qualified publicized opinions. Two subsequent consultative meetings were held in Geneva in October 2003. The Chairman-Rapporteur of the meeting, Mr. Alejandro Salinas, produced a report which the Commission on Human Rights received and welcomed.

On 19 April 2005, the Human Rights Commission passed Resolution 2005/35 during its 61st organisational session in New York, affirming the guidelines and also recommending them for approval by the General Assembly. Put before member states, the Resolution passed by a recorded vote of 40 in favour, with 12 abstentions and 0 voting against.

== Adoption ==
The Basic Principles and Guidelines were placed before the UN General Assembly in its 60th sitting. On 16 December 2005, the United Nations General Assembly adopted the Basic Principles and Guidelines as Resolution A/RES/60/147 (2005) by consensus. The Basic Principles and Guidelines were officially published by the United Nations in 2006.

== Victims under international law ==
The Resolution providing a comprehensive definition of victims, which combines existing definitions found in human rights instruments and jurisprudence. Principle 8 defines the term victim as including "persons who individually or collectively suffered harm, including physical or mental injury, emotional suffering, economic loss or substantial impairment of their fundamental rights ... also includes the immediate family or dependents of the direct victim and persons who have suffered harm in intervening to assist victims in distress or to prevent victimization."

The Resolution's focus away from perpetrators and towards victims is part of a wider shift in international criminal jurisprudence towards the acceptance of the rights, obligations and responsibilities that are owed to individuals under international law. This follows a general trend towards the recognition of the involvement of non-state actors in international law.

Prior to recent developments, the focus of human rights law has been on holding perpetrators accountable, and victims have remained in the background. The creation of international criminal tribunals and the increase in ratifications of human rights instruments over recent decades have provided more comprehensive recognisition of victims under international law. The creation of the International Criminal Court in 1998 under the Rome Statute increased the focus on victim perspectives. By establishing international criminal jurisdiction over the international crimes of genocide, crimes against humanity, war crimes and the crime of aggression, the Statute providing explicitly recognised the role of victims in international proceedings and defining their rights to reparation. The Basic Principles and Guidelines offered considerable guidance to the content of the Rome Statute in relation to recognising victims' rights, despite being in the drafting process at the time.

== The right to reparation ==
The Basic Principles and Guidelines extend the rights afforded to victims by combining entitlements afforded under both human rights law and humanitarian law. There is considerable overlap in the rights and protection afforded under these regimes, in areas such as the prohibition of discrimination on racial, gender and religious grounds and the right to a fair trial. International legal bodies, including the International Court of Justice, have affirmed that the application of human rights law and humanitarian law can be dual and complementary. This was confirmed in the 2006 ICJ judgment of Armed Activities on the Territory of the Congo. Many human rights theorists have argued that the distinction between different branches of international law is less relevant in determining redress of victims.

The Resolution is the first international instrument to altogether articulate the remedies for human rights violations. It clarifies the remedial rights of victims as comprising: (a) equal and effective access to justice;(b) adequate, effective and prompt reparation of harm suffered; (c) access to relevant information concerning violations and reparation mechanisms.

While this right has been confirmed in international law, and human rights instruments have addressed the remedial rights of victims, the Basic Principles was the first document that articulated these rights in full.

The Resolution prescribes that this can take five forms: restitution, compensation, rehabilitation, satisfaction, and the guarantee of non-repetition. This codifies the existing right to reparation which has been confirmed as an entitlement of customary international law.

There has been considerable discussion over whether the right to reparation is one that accrues individually or collectively. Some legal scholars have argued that the entitlement of victims to reparation is a collective right rather than an individual right, because it depends on the incorporation of human rights treaties into domestic legislation. The classification of reparation as an individual right has also been rejected on the grounds that it is not unequivocal, due to the exceptions created by law on state immunity. The right to reparation is restricted by the limited legal personality of individuals under international law. For a victim to receive reparation under international law, a State must bring a claim on their behalf. Exercising this right also requires that the State give any received compensation to that injured national, which is not required under international law. Under Article 19 of the Draft Articles on Diplomatic Protection, this is a decision at their discretion.
