= Takthok Monastery =

Buddhist monastery in Ladakh, India

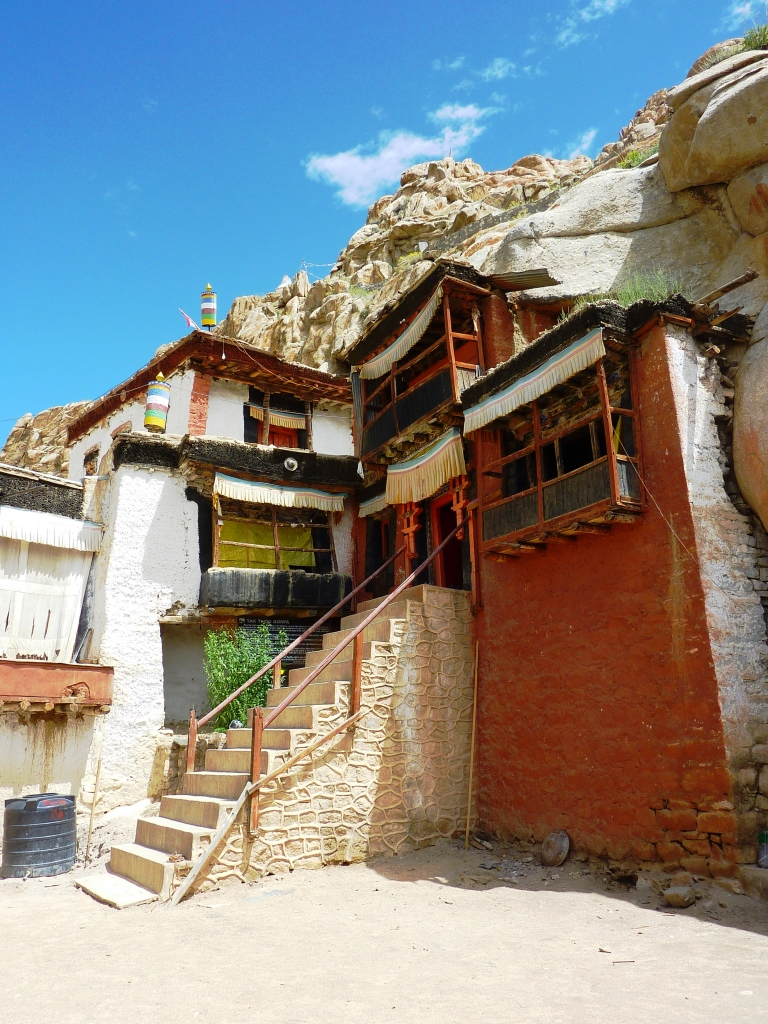
- Entrance to Guru Rinpoche's cave

- Location within Jammu and Kashmir

Religion
- Affiliation: Tibetan Buddhism
- Sect: Nyingma
- Deity: Padmasambhava
- Festival: Sacred Dances - 9th-10th day of the sixth month

Location
- Location: Sakti, Ladakh, India
- Coordinates: 34°0′19″N 77°49′13″E

Architecture
- Founder: Tsewang Namgyal I

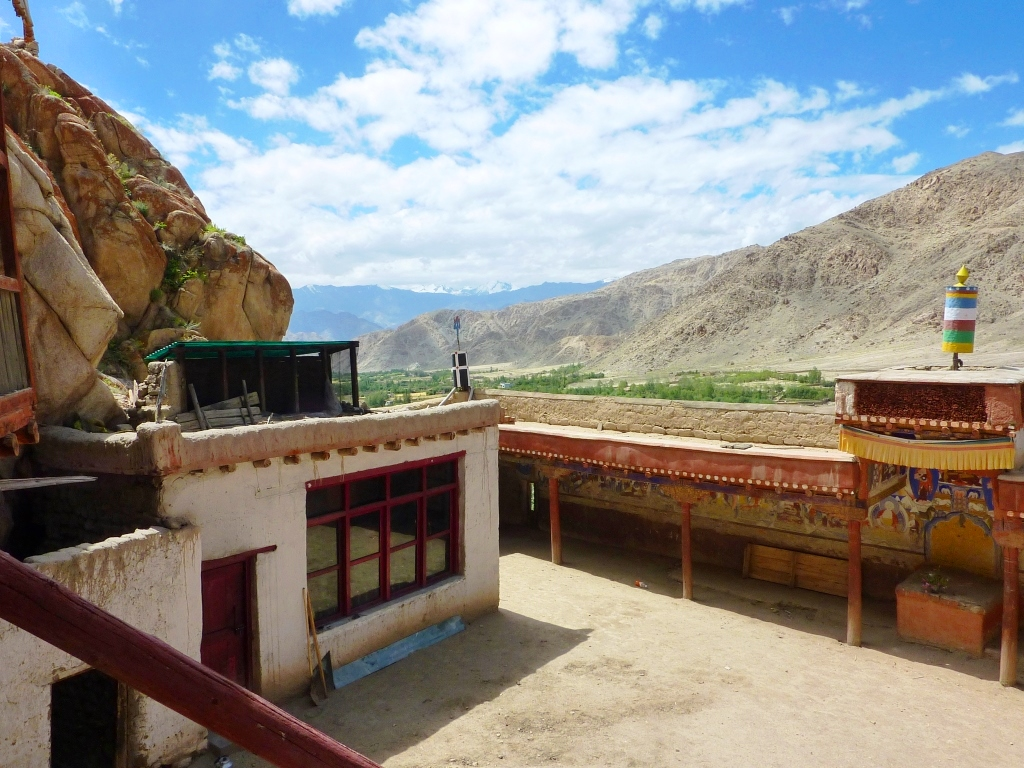
View from roof of Thagthok Gompa showing courtyard and galleries

Takthok Monastery (tib. བྲག་ཐོག་ Wylie = Brag Thog, pron. Trag Thog, "Stone Roof" in English) is a Buddhist monastery in Sakti village in Ladakh, northern India, located approximately 46 kilometres east of Leh. It is the only monastery in Ladakh belonging to the Nying-ma-pa or Red Hat sect. The name is Takthok, literally meaning 'rock-roof' was named because both its roof and walls are made of rock. It belongs to the Nyingma tradition of Tibetan Buddhism and approximately 55 lamas reside there. It is the only Nyingma monastery in Ladakh.

The monastery was founded around the mid-16th century during the reign of Tsewang Namgyal I (1575-1595) on a mountainside around a cave in which Padmasambhava is said to have meditated in the 8th century.

== Description ==
The main temple is very dark and gloomy with a low ceiling of rock completely covered with the residue from centuries of butterlamps having been burned there. The paintings that once adorned the walls are covered with grime and even the floor feels sticky. Further down another cave has been turned into a kitchen which has immense stoves capable of producing enough food for all the pilgrims who arrive for the annual festival (which has been shifted to the summer months to accommodate tourists). The Assembly Hall, or du-khang's verandah, has paintings of the Four Lords, while the walls have recent paintings of fierce protector divinities, some of which adorn the verandah entrance. The du-khang also contains statues of Maitreya, Padmasambhava and his manifestation Dorje Takposal.

A new temple was consecrated by the 14th Dalai Lama in 1980 just below the main gompa complex. A small cave behind them is believed to be the place where Padmasambhava lived and meditated for three years. The monastery also has the 108 volumes of the Kanjur of Buddha's teachings.

== Festival ==
Tak Tok Festival (Takthok Tsechu) is held around July–August.

== Gallery ==
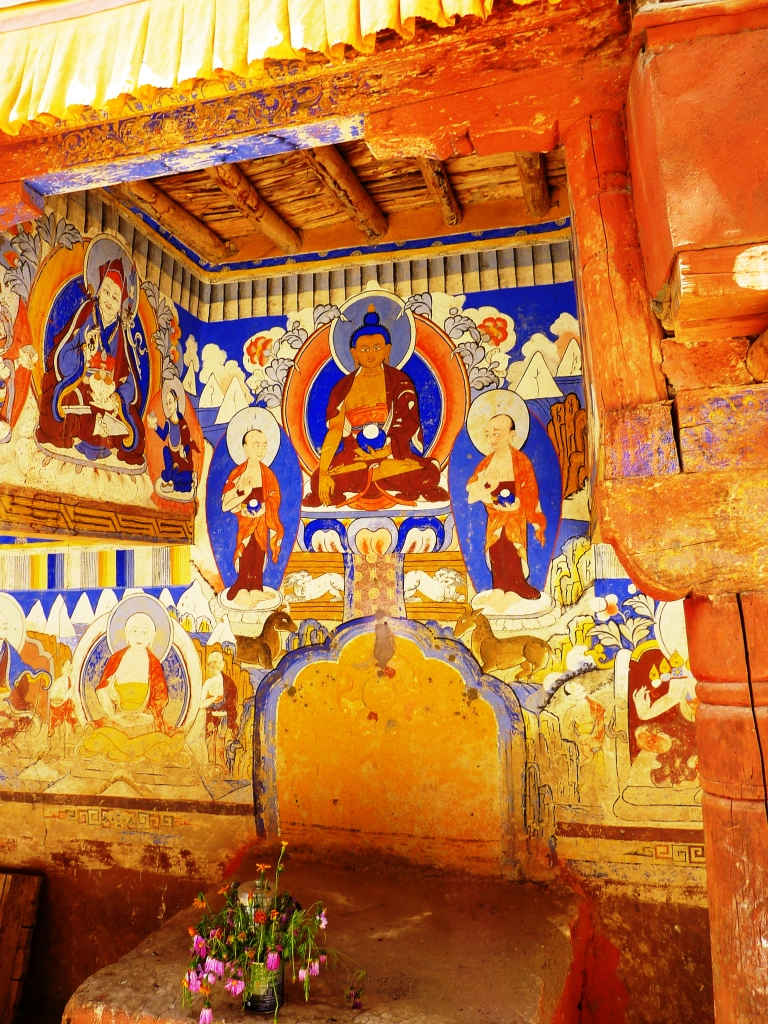
Outdoor shrine at Thagthok Gompa

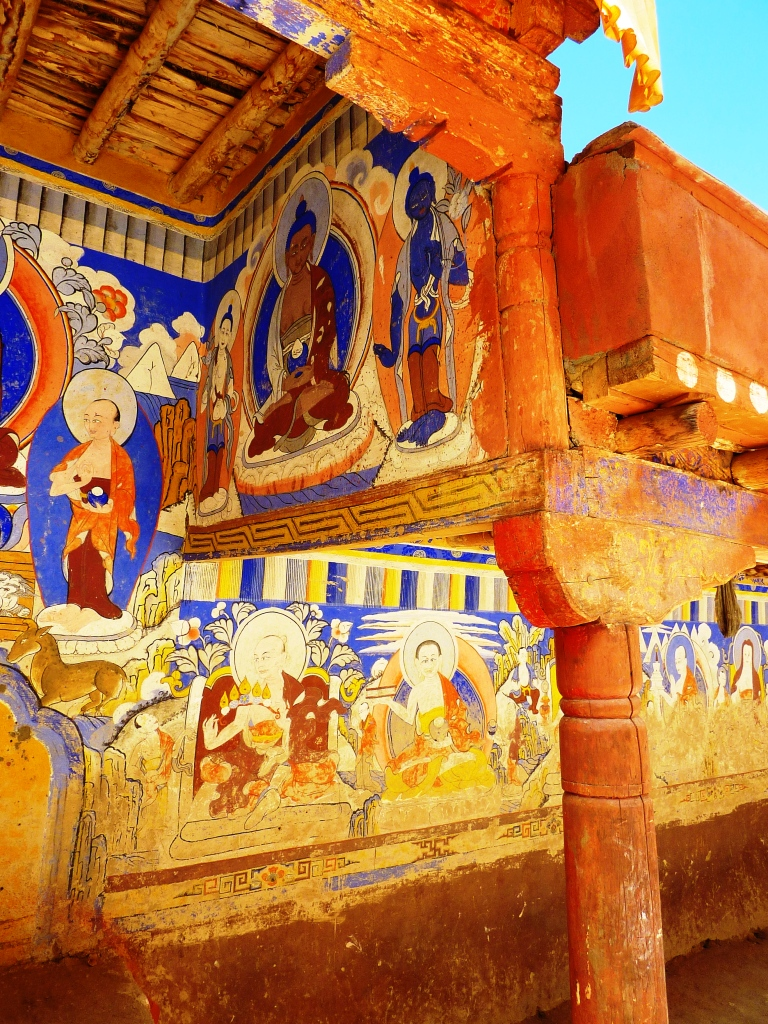
Wall paintings outside Thagthok Gompa

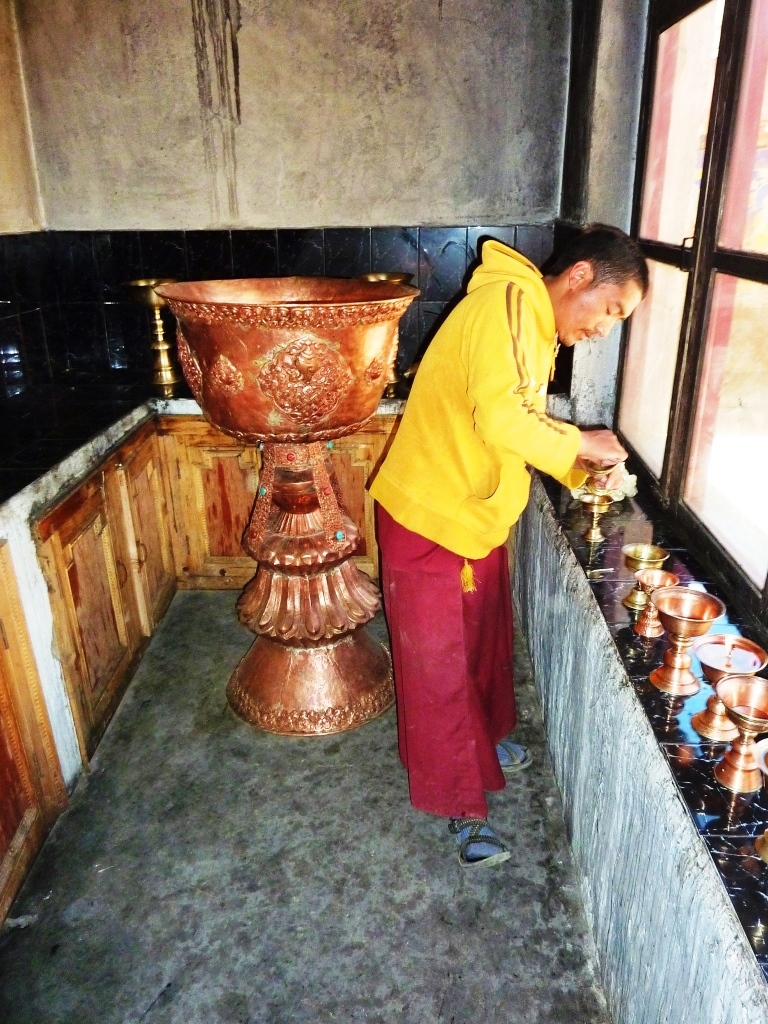
Preparing butter lamps at Thakthok Gompa

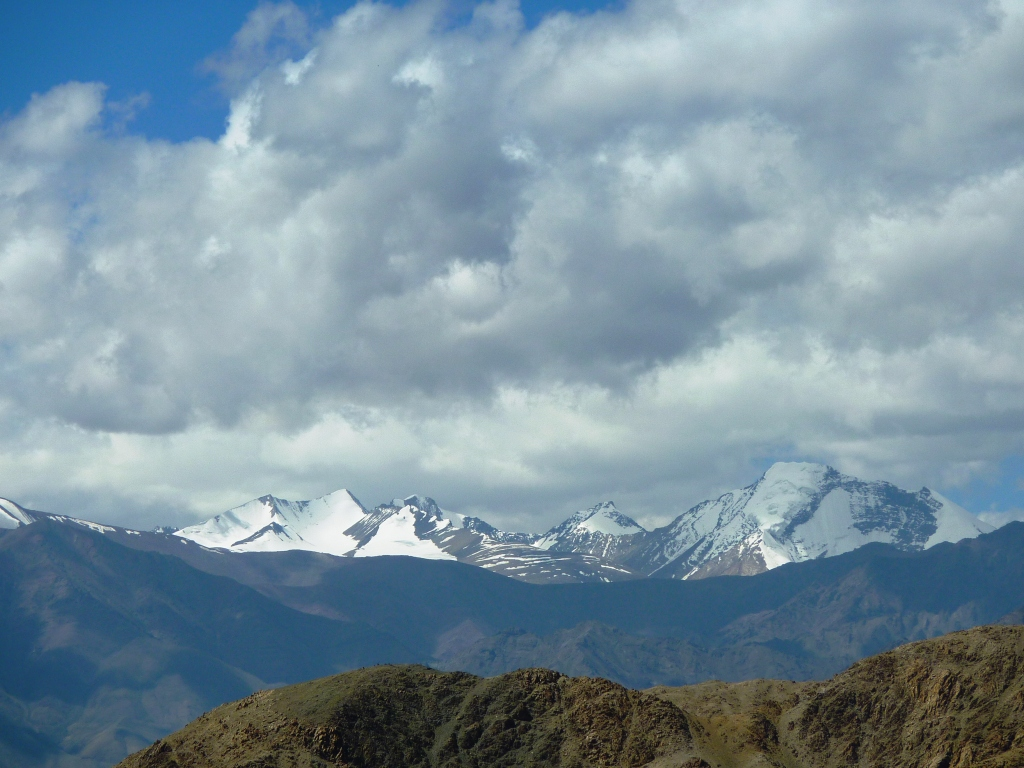
Mountain view from Takthok

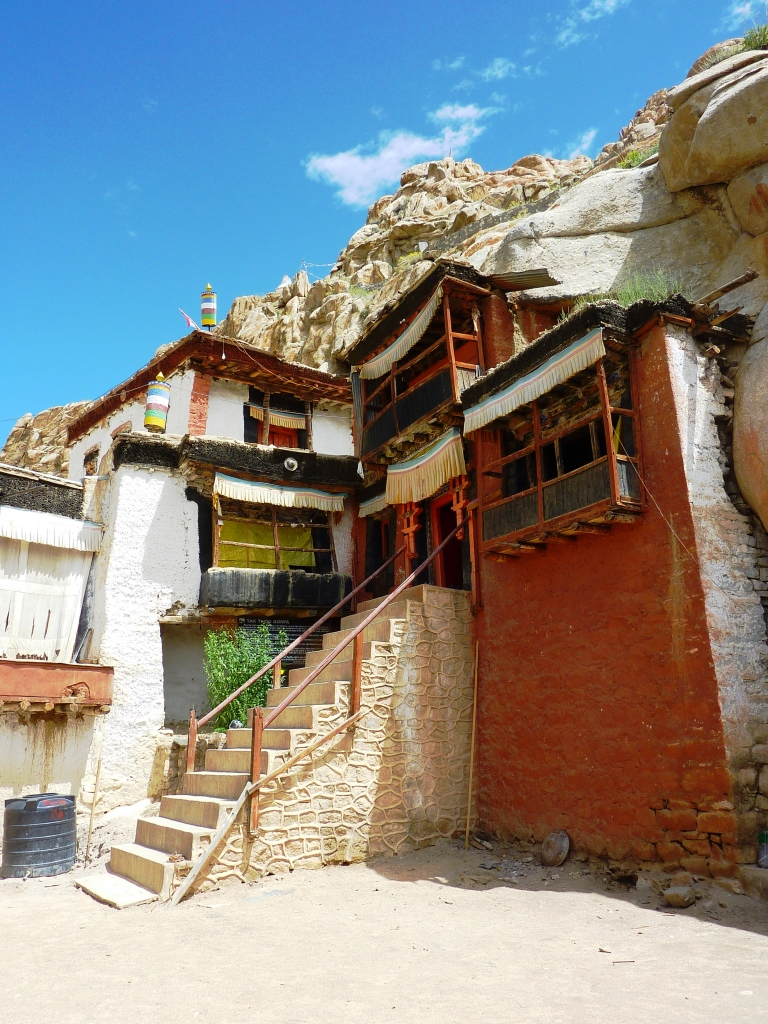
Entrance to Guru Rinpoche's cave.

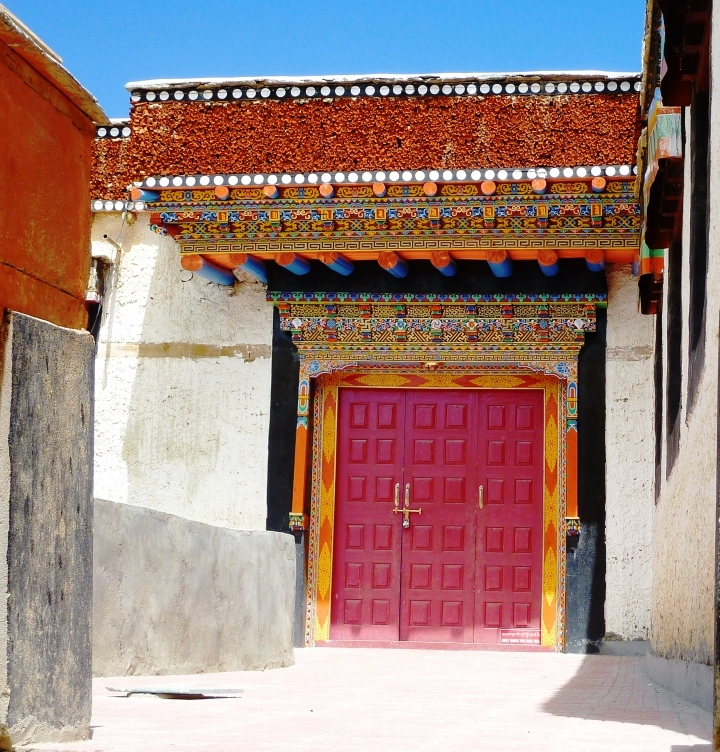
Gate at Takthok

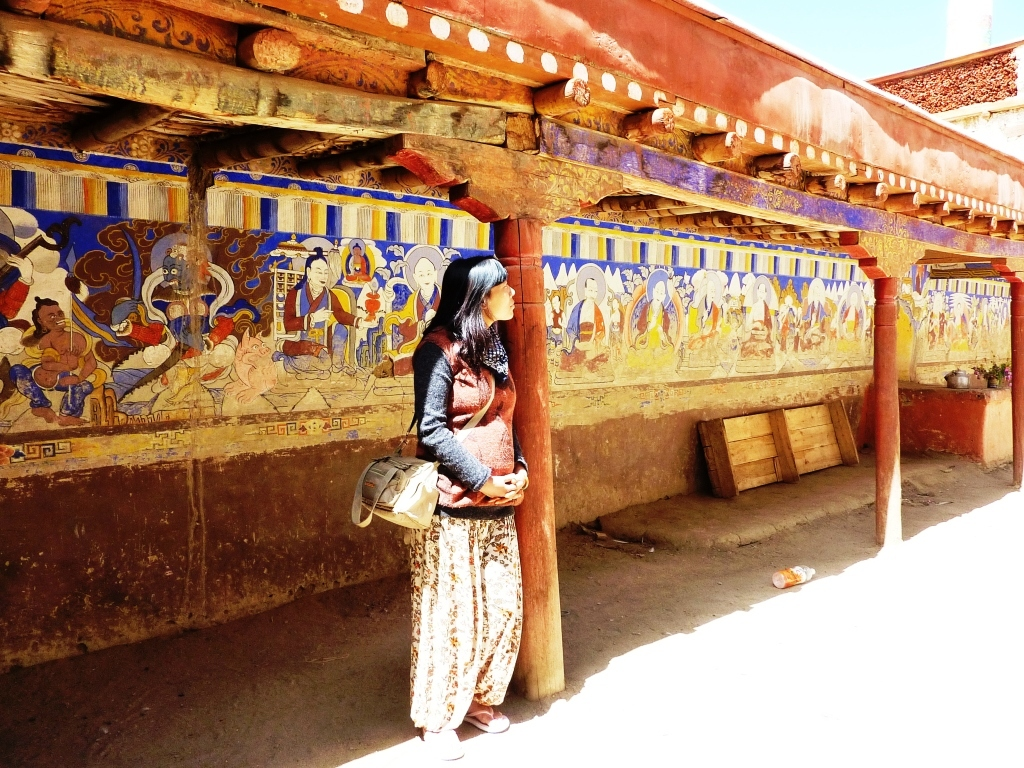
Ancient murals at Thagthok

== See also ==
- List of buddhist monasteries in Ladakh
- Geography of Ladakh
- Tourism in Ladakh
