= Tsering Woeser =

Tibetan writer, activist, blogger, poet and essayist

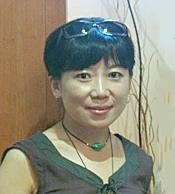
- Tsering Woeser on Voice of America's Chinese service, 2009
- Born: July 21, 1966 (age 60); Lhasa
- Education: Southwest University for Nationalities
- Occupation: Writer
- Spouse: Wang Lixiong
- Writing career
- Language: Chinese, Tibetan Ethnicity Tibetan
- Genres: Short story, poetry, essays
- Notable work: Notes on Tibet (西藏笔记)
- Notable awards: Prince Claus Awards; International Women of Courage Award

Tsering Woeser (Tibetan: ཚེ་རིང་འོད་ཟེར་, Wylie: tshe-ring 'od-zer, Lhasa dialect: [t͡sʰérìŋ wǿsèː]; Chinese: 唯色; pinyin: Wéisè, Han name Chéng Wénsà 程文萨; born July 21, 1966) is a Tibetan writer, activist, blogger, poet and essayist.

== Biography ==
Woeser, a quarter Han Chinese and three quarters Tibetan, was born in Lhasa. Her grandfather, Chinese, was an officer in the Nationalist Army of the Kuomintang and her father was a high rank Army officer in the People's Liberation Army. When she was very young, her family relocated to the Kham area of western Sichuan province. In 1988, she graduated from Southwest University for Nationalities in Chengdu with a degree in Chinese literature. She worked as a reporter in Garzê and later in Lhasa and has lived in Beijing since 2003 as a result of political problems. Woeser is married to Wang Lixiong, a renowned author who frequently writes about Tibet. According to Reporters Without Borders, "Woeser is one of the few Tibetan authors and poets to write in Chinese." When the government refused to give her a passport, she sued the authorities.

== Career ==
Video to honor Woeser by the Prince Claus Fund for her 2011 award

Woeser is the author of the book, Notes on Tibet (西藏笔记; Xīzàng Bǐjì). The Tibet Information Network quotes unnamed sources that the book was banned by the government around September 2003.

According to UNPO, shortly after the alleged ban, Woeser was also fired from her job and lost her status with her work unit. Radio Free Asia reported that she continued to post a variety of poems and articles to her two blogs: Maroon Map (绛红色的地图, oser.tibetcul.net), which, according to the author, was visited primarily by Tibetans and the Woeser blog (blog.daqi.com/weise), which was visited primarily by those of Han ethnicity. According to RFA, on July 28, 2006, both blogs were closed by order of the government, apparently in response to postings in which she expressed birthday greetings to the Dalai Lama and touched on other sensitive topics. Woeser stated that she would continue writing and speaking.

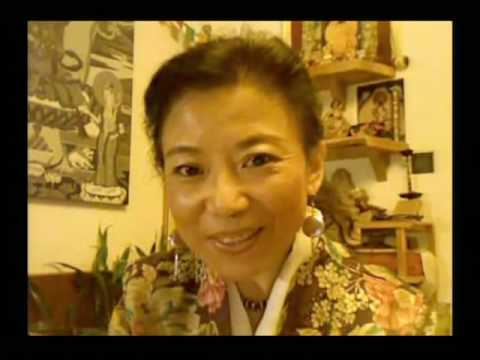
Woeser in her Beijing apartment in 2009 in front of her Tibetan Buddhist altar

During the Tibetan unrest of 2008, Woeser and her husband were put under house arrest after speaking to reporters. In December 2008, Woeser and her husband were among the first of the original 303 signatories to Charter 08, since joined by thousands more. Liu Xiaobo, the author of Charter 08, was sentenced for eleven years of prison and awarded the 2010 Nobel Peace Prize. In July 2009, Woeser and her husband were one of more than 100 signatories to a petition asking Chinese authorities to release detained ethnic-Uyghur professor of economics Ilham Tohti. When she was awarded the Prince Claus Award in 2011, she was forbidden to receive the prize in the Dutch embassy.

Tsering Woeser defended Tibetan actions in the 1905 Tibetan Rebellion, saying that Zhao Erfeng invaded the region to "brutally stop Tibetan protests", listing atrocities committed by Zhao.

Her "Garpon La's Offerings," translated by Dechen Pemba and Fiona Sze-Lorrain, appeared in The Penguin Book of Modern Tibetan Essays.

== Awards ==
- In 2007, Tsering Woeser was awarded the Norwegian Authors Union awards Freedom of Expression Prize.
- In 2007, she was also awarded the freedom of speech medal by the Association of Tibetan Journalists.
- In 2010, International Women's Media Foundation granted her with the Courage in Journalism Awards.
- In 2011, Prince Claus Awards, theme Breaking taboos
- In 2013, Tsering Woeser was awarded the International Women of Courage Award

== Works ==
- 《西藏在上》 [Live Tibet]. Xining: Qinghai People's Press. 1999.; Woeser's First poetry Edition
- 《西藏笔记》 [Notes on Tibet]. Guangzhou: Huacheng Publishing Press. 2003. ISBN 7-5360-3831-3.. Also published in Taiwan as 《名為西藏的詩》. Taiwan: 大块文化. 2006. ISBN 986-7291-90-5..
- Ma, Mingbo (马明博); Xiao, Yao (肖瑶), eds. (2004). 绛红色的尼玛次仁. Beijing: China Documents Press. ISBN 7-80166-415-9.
- 《絳紅色的地圖》. Taiwan: Shiying Publishing Press (時英出版社). 2003. ISBN 986-7762-04-5.; also published by China Tourism Press in 2004, ISBN 7-5032-2247-6.
- Jin, Zhiguo (金志国), ed. (2004). 八廓街的沧桑. Lhasa: Tibet People's Publishing House. ISBN 7-223-01587-X.
- 《杀劫》 [Forbidden memory. Tibet during the Cultural Revolution]. Taiwan: 大块文化. 2006. ISBN 986-7291-84-0.
- Tibet's True Heart. Selected Poems. Dobbs Ferry, NY, 2008 (Ragged Banner Press Excerpts), ISBN 978-0-9816989-0-8. Poems by Woeser (Weise), translated by A. E. Clark, Review 10−10−2008 (highpeakspureearth.com) Review 10−10−2008 (savetibet.org)
- Tibet on Fire: Self-Immolations Against Chinese Rule Verso, London (2016) ISBN 978-1784781538
- Forbidden Memory Tibet during the Cultural Revolution English edition, published 2020 by University of Nebraska Press, By Tsering Woeser, Photographs by Tsering Dorje, Edited by Robert Barnett, Translated by Susan T. Chen, Foreword by Wang Lixiong.
- Ocean, as Much as Rain: Stories, Lyrical Prose, and Poems from Tibet, By Tsering Woeser, Translated and Edited by Fiona Sze-Lorrain with Dechen Pemba, Foreword by Pankaj Mishra, Duke University Press (2026) ISBN 978-1-4780-3311-0
