= Tibet on Fire =

2016 book by Tsering Woeser

- Author: Tsering Woeser
- Translator: Kevin Carrico
- Cover artist: Ai Weiwei (Chinese dissident artist)
- Language: English
- Subject: Complex issues around the protests and self-immolations by Tibetans in Tibet today, under Chinese occupation
- Genre: non-fiction, history, political science, politics, Asian studies
- Set in: Tibet
- Published: London
- Publisher: Verso Books
- Publication date: 12 January 2016
- Publication place: United Kingdom
- Media type: Paperback, Digital
- Pages: 128
- ISBN: 978-1-78478-153-8 (Paperback)
- Website: Publisher's website

Tibet on Fire: Self-Immolations Against Chinese Rule is a book written by Tsering Woeser, published by Verso Books in 2016. The book is a contemporary look at a major social and human rights problem caused by the forced integration of Tibetan and Chinese societies, and due to empirically repressive policies of the Chinese (PRC) government.

== Synopsis ==
Tibet on Fire is an account of the discrimination and atrocities faced by Tibetans in 21st century Tibet, and their resistance to foreign/Chinese rule and occupation. It is written from the perspective of a Tibetan with personal experience in the Tibet-China conflict. Since the 2008 uprising, nearly 150 (Note: Quote: "At least three people set themselves on fire in Tibetan-populated areas during [2016-2017] in protest against repressive policies by the authorities. The number of known self-immolations since February 2009 rose to 146.") Tibetans, most of them monks, have set fire to themselves to protest foreign occupation of their country. Most have died from their injuries. It is important to understand the book is not about self-immolation, but uses this horrific reality as a way to focus and then delve into the fervent emotions central to Tibetans and their long search for national and individual freedom. The book provides insight into the ideals and personal motivations driving those who resist: the self-immolators and also other Tibetans like the author.

== Historical setting ==
Tibetans have been protesting occupational and unjust rules since the China militarily entered and used false treaties to occupy their sovereign nation of Tibet in 1950. China has since then gradually introduced more repression through subtle policies that weaken and disenfranchise the native Tibetan population. Their aim seems to be to either wipe-out Tibetan people (Note: Quote: The "human rights problems during the year [2012] included: extrajudicial killings, including executions without due process; enforced disappearance and incommunicado detention, including prolonged illegal detentions at unofficial holding facilities known as “black jails”; torture and coerced confessions of prisoners; detention and harassment of lawyers, journalists, writers, dissidents, petitioners, and others who sought to exercise peacefully their rights under the law; [...] a coercive birth-limitation policy that in some cases resulted in forced abortion (sometimes at advanced stages of pregnancy) or forced sterilization; trafficking in persons; ...") and their culture, or to dilute them with the dominant Chinese Han. (Note: Quote: [In October 2013 the Spanish National Court (Audiencia Nacional) found] “international evidence of the repression carried out by Chinese leaders against the Tibetan nation and its population [...] the Chinese authorities decided to carry out a series of coordinated actions aimed at eliminating the specific characteristics and existence of the country of Tibet by imposing martial law, carrying out forced transfers and mass sterilisation campaigns, torturing dissidents and forcibly transferring contingents of Chinese in order to gradually dominate and eliminate the indigenous population in the country of Tibet.”) As a result many Tibetans have had to escape to other countries, but the 6 million Tibetans remaining in their occupied homeland experience daily oppression through unreported atrocities. (Note: Quote: "The Chinese demolished about 2,000 huts in 2001, 'because of concerns about social stability' at the site, simultaneously limiting the population to 1,400 residents.") (Note: Quote: "The Chinese Communist [government's] reaction [...] has been to force Tibetans to [...] prove their loyalty to the Communist Party instead, and many Tibetan objectors have been beaten or jailed.") Especially targeted are Tibet's Buddhist monasteries and schools, whom the Communist and anti-religious Chinese government sees as the main stewards/teachers of Tibetan culture. These Buddhist monasteries and schools, the largest being Larung Gar Buddhist Academy with between 10,000 and 40,000 residents, are literally and systematically being demolished, and the monks who lived in the destroyed monasteries, young men and women, are force-ably relocated en masse to live in political concentration camps they call "patriotic camps". The displaced monks see no way out of the increasingly harsh indoctrination and punishments meted by authorities. With their educational, spiritual, and physical/housing needs literally discarded, they see little hope or a personal future.

As a result, these young men and women are more often taking dire steps to bring attention to their plight. One method they use, self-immolation, (Note: Quote: "At least three people set themselves on fire in Tibetan-populated areas during [2016-2017] in protest against repressive policies by the authorities.") is the guiding theme the book uses to explain the complex interplay of issues, emotions, intentions, and hope. The book portrays the anguish felt by Tibetan leaders at each life lost, and their hope that public attention will bring realization that every life, especially every young Tibetan person's life, is vitally needed to fight the cancerous oppression.

== Reception ==
One of the world's leading historians and experts in the China-Tibet conflict, Dr. Elliot Sperling, a Professor, MacArthur Fellow and author of The China-Tibet Conflict: History and Polemics gave his perspective on the book and its author: “Woeser is one of the most well-informed and trenchant commentators on Tibet today, and with this volume she presents readers with a unique and well-reasoned analysis and account of the phenomenon of self-immolation in Tibet, its precipitating causes and its significance. This is a most important book about a most urgent subject: the ongoing consequences of continued Chinese repression in Tibet.”

Dr. James Leibold, also an academic and author, praised Tibet on Fire by writing “Tibet on Fire is a deeply moving and humanising book by an intrepid women with one foot in both Tibetan and Chinese societies. Woeser takes us behind the headlines and helps us better understand why so many Tibetan people have chosen to end their lives in this horrific form of protest”
