= Irmtraut Wäger =

German human rights activist (1919–2014)

Amala Irmtraut Wäger
- Born: 29 August 1919; Rastenburg, East Prussia, German Empire
- Died: 2 October 2014 (aged 95); Munich, Bavaria, Germany
- Occupation: Tibetan rights activist
- Years active: 1979–2014
- Organization: Deutsche Tibethilfe
- Children: 2

Irmtraut Wäger (29 August 1919 – 2 October 2014) was a German human rights activist. She was primarily known for her support of Tibetan refugees in India and Nepal, and between 1984 and 2009 served as the first chairperson of the Deutsche Tibethilfe e. V. (lit. 'German Aid to Tibetans') which under her leadership turned into one of the largest aid organisations for Tibetan refugees in the world.

== Early life ==
Wäger was born in Rastenburg, East Prussia, in what was then the German Empire, the fourth child of a Rittergut. Due to economic difficulties as a result of the Great Depression, her family became impoverished during the 1930s. During World War II, Wäger worked at a hospital in Königsberg. It was during this time that she first learned about Tibet, including reading the travelogues of Sven Hedin. In 1944, during the flight and expulsion of Germans from East Prussia, Wäger became a refugee, and, after periods in Peenemünde and Detmold, settled in Munich.

Wäger married at the age of 17, in around 1936, and had two children before getting divorced in the early 1940s. The children remained with their father and Wäger went on to have two more children.

== Post-war period ==
In Munich, Wäger held various jobs, including as a pieceworker, and later as an office worker for Siemens. In 1969, she and her two sons moved into an apartment on Mauthäuslstraße in Munich, where she remained until she died. The apartment became the headquarters and office of Deutsche Tibethilfe between 1993 and 2009, and was visited by Tenzin Gyatso, the 14th Dalai Lama, in 2003. Prior to and after those dates, Deutsche Tibethilfe was based in Hamburg.

== Activism ==
In 1964, Wäger began sponsoring a Tibetan monk. Wäger became a more active activist following her retirement at the age of 60 in 1979. After winning money in the lottery, she financed Detlef-Ingo Lauf, who would go on to become a noted Tibetologist, to go on a study trip to India. In 1974, Wäger made her first trip to India, where she met TIbetan refugees for the first time; she later stated that meeting refugees evoked her own memory of being a refugee herself. She returned to the refugee camps after retiring in 1979, and afterwards led an awareness campaign for Tibet in Germany, which by 1984 became the Deutsche Tibethilfe. She convinced notable philanthropists, including Hermann Gmeiner, the founder of SOS Children's Villages, to support the Tibetan cause. After retiring, Wäger visited India and Nepal almost annually to visit refugee settlements and to arrange sponsorships through Deutsche Tibethilfe. During her trips, she would visit the Dalai Lama in Dharamsala to report on her findings from the refugee camps. She became known to Tibetans as "amala" (Standard Tibetan: ཨ་མ་ལགས, romanized: a ma lags, lit. 'revered mother').

Wäger retired from Deutsche Tibethilfe in 2009 at the age of 90.

== Recognition ==
Wäger died on 2 October 2014 at the age of 95 in her home in Munich. The Dalai Lama expressed his condolences to her family, stating that Tibetans had lost a "friend", further describing her as "unique" for fundraising for Tibetans and also visiting them in refugee camps. The Central Tibetan Administration released a statement stating that her activism had played a "pivotal role in the sustenance of the Tibetan community in exile", describing her as a "beacon of light". The International Campaign for Tibet also mourned her death and called her an "outstanding figure".

In 1986, Wäger was awarded the Order of Merit of the Federal Republic of Germany. In 2004, she received the Light of Truth Award from the Dalai Lama in Berlin.

In 2011, Wäger's autobiography was published, entitled Amala: Mein Leben für Tibet (lit. 'Amala: My Life for Tibet'). The Dalai Lama wrote the foreword to the book

A documentary about Wäger entitled Mother of Tibetans, directed by German filmmaker Niklas Goslar, was selected for the 7th Indian Cine Filmfest in 2019.
