= Yellow Peril (novel) =

Novel by Wang Lixiong

- Author: Lixiong Wang
- Original title: 黄禍 : 新世紀版
- Language: Chinese
- Subject: Nuclear warfare, China
- Genre: Science fiction
- Published: Taibei Shi : Da kuai wen hua chu ban gu fen you xian gong si, 2008
- Publication place: China
- Media type: Book
- Pages: 464
- ISBN: 9789862130902
- OCLC: 319691593

Yellow Peril (Chinese: 黃禍; pinyin: Huáng Huò) is a 1991 novel by Wang Lixiong, written in Chinese under the pseudonym Bao Mi (lit. "Secret"), about a civil war in the People's Republic of China that becomes a nuclear exchange and soon engulfs the world, causing World War III. It is notable for Wang Lixiong's politics, a Chinese dissident and outspoken activist, its publication following Tiananmen Square protests of 1989, and its popularity due to bootleg distribution across China even when the book was banned by the Chinese Communist Party.

The book was published in 1991 by Mirror Books, a Chinese editor in Toronto, Canada, and soon became a best-seller.

== Translation ==
- China Tidal Wave, Wang Lixiong, Michael Dillon, translation Anton Platero, Editeur Global Books Ltd. (UK), April 2007, University of Hawaii Press; April 2008, ISBN 1-905246-50-1
