= Sakti, Ladakh =

Sakti Serthi Serthi / Sarkti
- Village
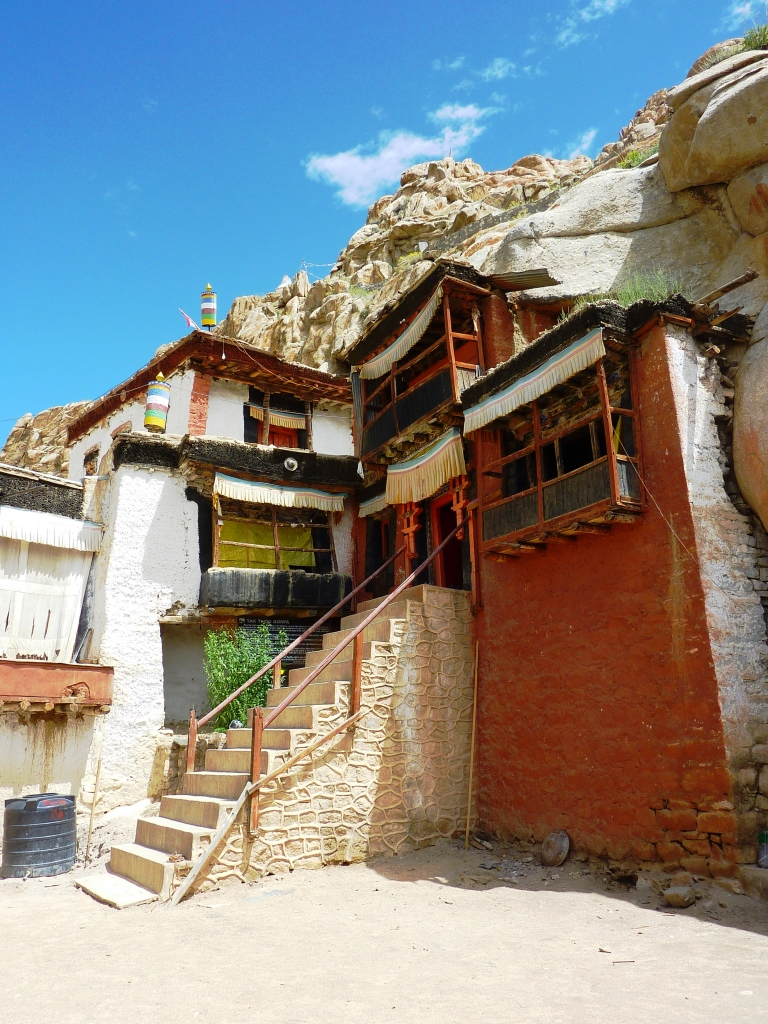
- Takthok Monastery

- Location in Ladakh, India Sakti (India)
- Coordinates: 33°59′52″N 77°49′00″E
- Country: India
- Union Territory: Ladakh
- District: Leh
- Tehsil: Kharu
- Elevation: 3,812 m (12,507 ft)

Population (2011)
  - Total: 1,718

Languages
  - Official: Hindi, English
- Time zone: UTC+5:30 (IST)
- 2011 census code: 872

Sakti (Tibetan: གསེར་ཁྲི་, Wylie: sag kri) is a village in the Leh district of Ladakh, India. It is located in the Kharu tehsil. The Takthok Monastery is located here.

== Demographics ==
According to the 2011 census of India, Sakti has 370 households. The effective literacy rate (i.e. the literacy rate of population excluding children aged 6 and below) is 67.7%.

Demographics (2011 Census)
	Total	Male	Female
Population	1718	816	902
Children aged below 6 years	167	87	80
Scheduled caste	1	0	1
Scheduled tribe	1713	813	900
Literates	1050	577	473
Workers (all)	954	429	525
Main workers (total)	936	421	515
Main workers: Cultivators	695	262	433
Main workers: Agricultural labourers	22	10	12
Main workers: Household industry workers	6	4	2
Main workers: Other	213	145	68
Marginal workers (total)	18	8	10
Marginal workers: Cultivators	7	3	4
Marginal workers: Agricultural labourers	0	0	0
Marginal workers: Household industry workers	2	2	0
Marginal workers: Others	9	3	6
Non-workers	764	387	377

== See also ==
- List of buddhist monasteries in Ladakh
- Geography of Ladakh
- Tourism in Ladakh
