= Theo van Boven =

Dutch jurist and academic (1934–2026)

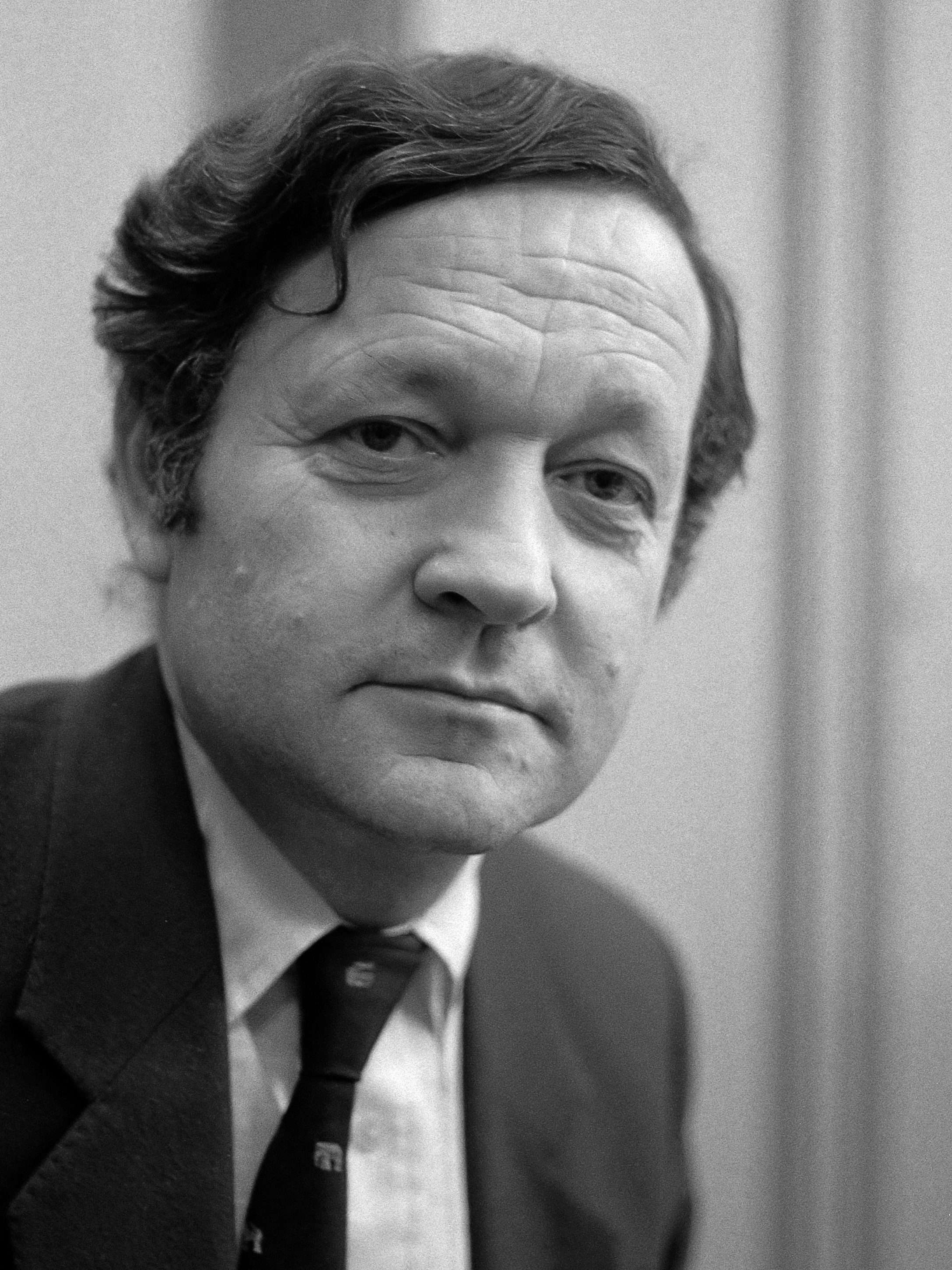
van Boven in 1983

Theodoor Cornelis van Boven (26 May 1934 – 9 May 2026) was a Dutch jurist and academic in international law.

== Life and career ==
Van Boven was born on 26 May 1934. In 1977, he was appointed director of the United Nations' Division for Human Rights, a precursor of the UN Human Rights Office.

From 1986 to 1991, he was the UN's Special Rapporteur on the Right to Reparation to Victims of Gross Violations of Human Rights and, from 2001 to 2004, Special Rapporteur on Torture. He was also a member of the International Commission of Jurists. From February 1994 to December 1994, he was the first registrar of the International Criminal Tribunal for the former Yugoslavia.

In 1985, he was awarded the Right Livelihood Award for "speaking out on human rights abuse without fear or favour in the international community", in 2004, the Wateler Peace Prize and in 2013, the Light of Truth Award. From 1995 to 2016 he was jury member of the Nuremberg International Human Rights Award.

On 16 December 2005, the United Nations General Assembly adopted the resolution 60/147, titled 'Basic Principles and Guidelines on the Right to a Remedy and Reparation for Victims of Gross Violations of International Human Rights Law and Serious Violations of International Humanitarian Law'. These principles are largely inspired from the work of Van Boven and Cherif Bassiouni and are known as the Van Boven/Bassiouni Principles.

In November 2009, he was given a doctorate honoris causa from the University of Buenos Aires.

Van Boven stated his support for the Campaign for the Establishment of a United Nations Parliamentary Assembly, an organisation which advocates for democratic reform in the United Nations, and the creation of a more accountable international political system.

Van Boven died on 9 May 2026, aged 91.

== Documentary film ==
Van Boven starred in the documentary film The Subversives. The plot centers about his job as director of UN Human Rights affairs of the late 70s and early 80s. The film tells of his commitment to the many thousands of disappearances and refugees, his actions against military dictatorships and his confronting UN Secretary General Javier Pérez de Cuéllar.
