= Wang Lixiong =

Chinese writer and scholar (born 1953)

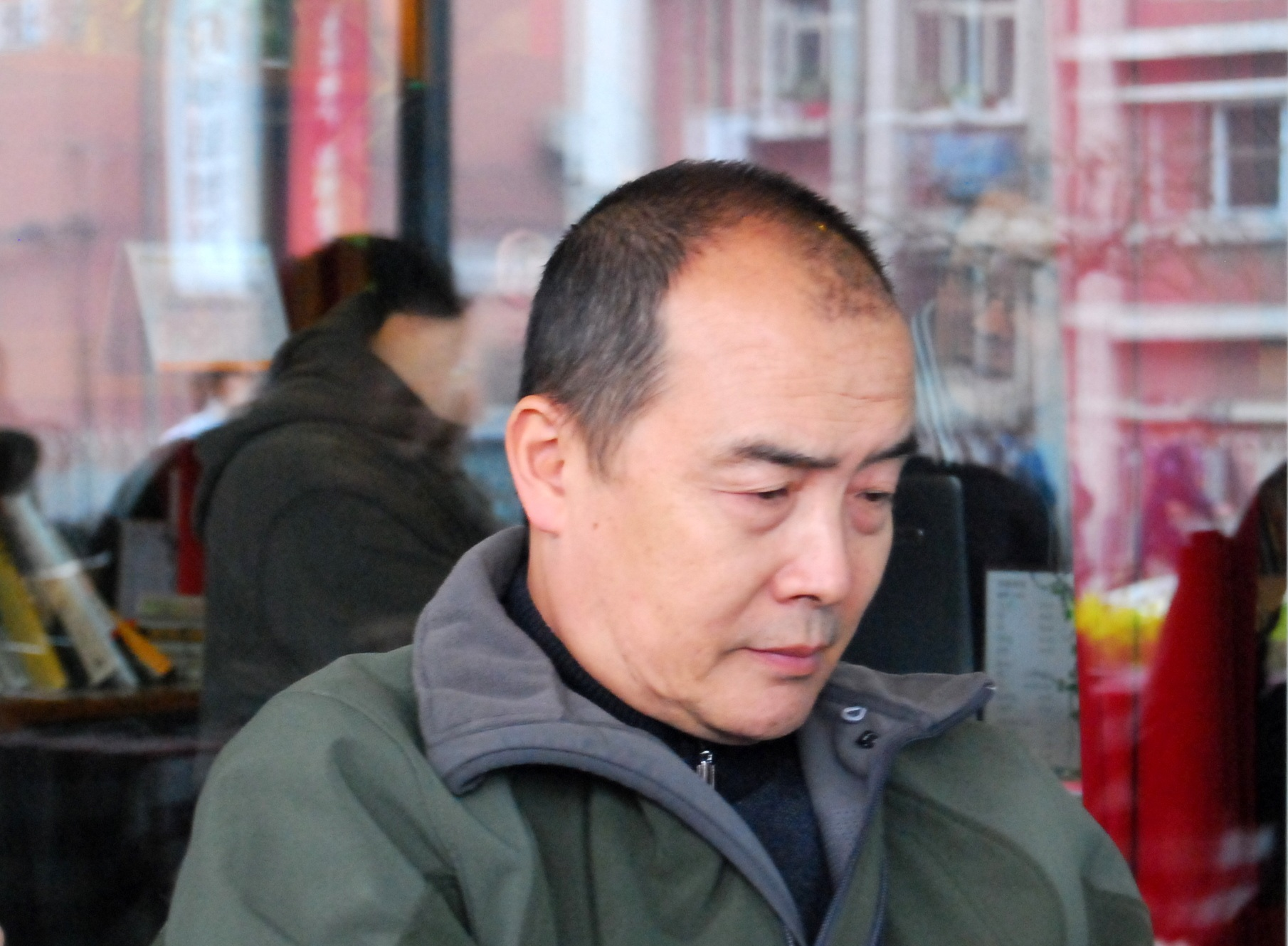
Wang Lixiong

Wang Lixiong (Chinese: 王力雄; pinyin: Wáng Lìxióng, born 2 May 1953) is a Chinese writer and scholar, best known for his political prophecy fiction, Yellow Peril, and for his writings on Tibet and provocative analysis of China's western region of Xinjiang.

Wang is regarded as one of the most outspoken dissidents, democracy activists, and reformers in China. He is married to Woeser, a Tibetan poet and essayist.

== Early life and education ==
Wang Lixiong was born in 1953 at Changchun in Jilin province. His mother was a playwright with the Changchun Film Group Corporation and his father, Wang Shaolin, was the vice president of China First Automobile Works, and committed suicide in 1968 after being imprisoned during the Cultural Revolution.

Wang was sent to countryside for four years from 1969 to 1973 following Mao Zedong's Down to the Countryside Movement. In 1973, he was admitted into Jilin University of Technology, and was assigned to work in China First Automobile Works after graduation.

== Writings ==
In 1991 Mirror Books published Wang's story Yellow Peril under the pseudonym Bao Mi (Mandarin for "Kept Secret"). The book followed an apocalyptic scenario in which civil war erupts between north and south China - with Nationalist-ruled Taiwan backing the south - resulting in nuclear conflict and widespread mass-migratino. For years, the author of one of the best-selling novels in the Chinese-speaking world was known simply to readers as "Bao Mi", for Wang's own protection because he broke taboos and spelled China's doomsday. Yellow Peril was recently translated into English as China Tidal Wave.

Wang finished his next publication, Sky Burial: The Fate of Tibet, in 1998, after more than a decade of study of the Tibet region. Within this time he visited Tibet dozens of times and lived there for more than two years. The book's neutral investigation of Tibet's histories and contemporary issues immediately won him high regards from both the supporters of Chinese government and followers of The Dalai Lama, and became a mandate in Tibet study.

From 1991 to 1994, he wrote a book of political theory, Dissolving Power: A Successive Multi-Level Electoral System, which drew tremendous disruptive responses although he himself valued it the most – some believed it offers a promising solution that China could and should adopt for a smooth transition towards democracy, some think it is purely a dream of utopia.

After ten more years of further study in progressive democracy, he completed another political theory book Bottom up Democracies in 2006. Realizing that it is not possible to promote his theory in China and make it a political reality, he started to research on internet development trying to find the linchpin which will connect his theory with real world.

== Social activities ==
In 1994, Wang Lixiong initiated as one of the founders The Friends of Nature, an environment protection organization, the first non-governmental organization in China, was forced to resign in 2003 on the request from Chinese government.

To support Tenzin Delek Rinpoche, an important Tibetan Lama of the region of Litang who was accused of being involved in a bomb attack and sentenced to death penalty, On December 13, 2002 Wang Lixiong and 24 other Chinese intellectuals issued a petition requesting the right to appoint independent lawyers for Rinpoche's trial, as well as the right for local and international media to cover the trial and interview Chinese government officials; in addition, the petition called for representatives of the Tibetan community in exile to attend the proceedings.

In 2001, Wang issued a public statement on his decision to resign from China Writers Association: "It is not only acquiescence which is demanded, but also the annihilation of the whole personality, of all conscience and of all individual pride, that we are being made into crouching dogs. Belonging to this organization is no longer an honor, on the contrary, is a shame of any writer worthy of the name".

Believing that the Dalai Lama is the key to resolve the issues of Tibet[1], [2], Wang Lixiong, together with other Chinese intellectuals, strongly urged Chinese authorities to take the Middle-Way Approach proposed by the Dalai Lama into serious consideration as it showed the deepest sincerity from the Dalai lama, should be treated as the basis for any further negotiations for the future of Tibet. He was invited four times to meet with the Dalai Lama with regard to this matter. His analysis of Middle Way was elaborated in his work Unlocking Tibet.[3] And his meeting with the Dalai Lama was documented in his article Dialogues with the Dalai Lama.

In the wake of Tibet riot on March 10, 2008, Wang, with the support from the pro-democracy activities in China, urged the Chinese government to invite UN investigators to Tibet to change the international community's distrust of China, and on March 22, 2008, issued a 12-point petition about the situation in Tibet.

== Arrest and imprisonment ==
Wang first began to study Xinjiang in 1999. When conducting research for a book following the same suit of Sky Burial: The Fate of Tibet, he was arrested for photocopying an internal publication - stamped as "secret" - of Xinjiang Production and Construction Corps. Refusing to recant or promise collaboration in order to obtain his release, he attempted suicide in the high-security prison in Miquan. He recorded the incident in a short essay entitled Memories of Xinjiang published in 2001. In prison, he shared a cell with a Uyghur prisoner arrested in Beijing for organizing a demonstration protesting discrimination (Mokhtar), with whom he entered into a long and ongoing discussion on Xinjiang which formed the backbone of his book My West China; Your East Turkestan published in 2007. In this book, Wang concluded that Xinjiang's issues had dangerously "Palestinized." The Xinjiang riot in July 2009 proved his fear.

Wang would be placed under house arrest whenever there were sensitive incidents or events. i.e. the outbreak of anti-Chinese protests in Tibet in March 2008.

== Awards and honors ==
2009 Light of Truth Award honored by the Dalai Lama on behalf of ICT

2007 Honorary membership, Chinese Studies Association of New Zealand

2003 Hellman-Hammett Grants, Human Rights Watch

2002 Freedom of Expression Award, Independent Chinese Pen Association

2002 Visiting Scholarship, US Congress

1999 The 100 Most Influential Chinese Novels in 20th Century (Yellow Peril ranked 41st), Asia Weekly

== Works ==
=== Books ===
2009 Voices from Tibet (听说西藏), Lotus Publishing (co-authored with Tsering Woeser)

2009 Sky Burial: The Fate of Tibet, 2nd Edition (天葬:西藏的命运再版), Lotus Publishing

2009 The Struggle for Tibet, Verso Publishing (co-authored with Tsering Shakya)

2008 China Tidal Wave (English edition of Yellow Peril translated by Anton Platero), Global Oriental Ltd.

2008 Yellow Peril, New Century Edition (黄祸新世纪版), Lotus Publishing

2007 The Ceremony (大典), Da kuai wen Publishing

2007 My West China; Your East Turkestan (我的西域; 你的东土), Lotus Publishing

2006 Bottom-up Democracy (递进民主), Lotus Publishing

2006 Unlocking Tibet, Tersey Tsultim Publishing

2002 Dialogue with Dalai Lama, Renjian Publishing

2002 The Spiritual Journey of a Free Soul, China Movie Publishing

1998 Dissolving Power: A Successive Multi-Level Electoral System (溶解权力: 逐層递选制), Mirror Books Publishing

1998 Sky Burial: The Destiny of Tibet (天葬:西藏的命运), Mirror Books Publishing

1991 Yellow Peril (黄祸), Mirror Books Publishing

1988 Drifting (漂流), Huacheng Publishing

1984 Gate to Heaven (天堂之门), Huacheng Publishing

=== Major essays ===
2010 Democracy 2.0 - From Direct Democracy to Vector Democracy 民主2.0——从数量民主到矢量民主

2008 History of Tibetan-Chinese Relations (西藏与中国的历史关系)

2008 Roadmap of Tibet Independence (西藏独立路线图)

2009 Mappō (末法时代)

2004 The Two Types of Imperialism That Tibet Encounters (西藏面临的两种帝国主义)

2002 Reflections on Tibet (西藏问题的文化反思)

2000 A Successive Multilevel Electoral System vs. a Representative Democratic System: Comparison on Resolutions for Tibet Issues (逐层递选制与代议民主制: 解决西藏问题的方法比较)

=== Columnist contribution ===
- 2004–Present: Radio Free Asia, Washington D.C.
- 2002: Ming Pao, Hong Kong
