= Butter lamp =

Lamps traditionally burning clarified yak butter

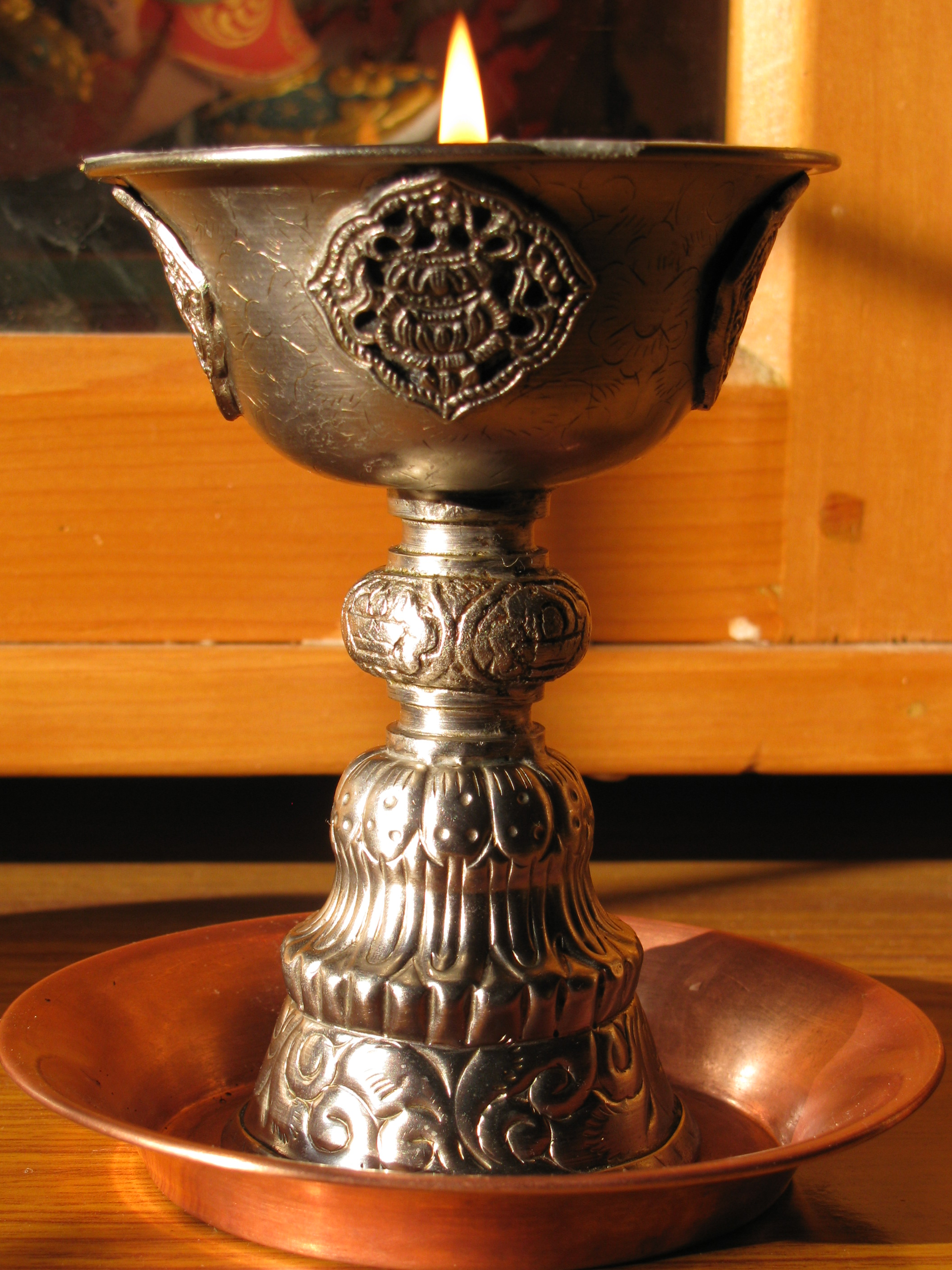
A Tibetan butter lamp

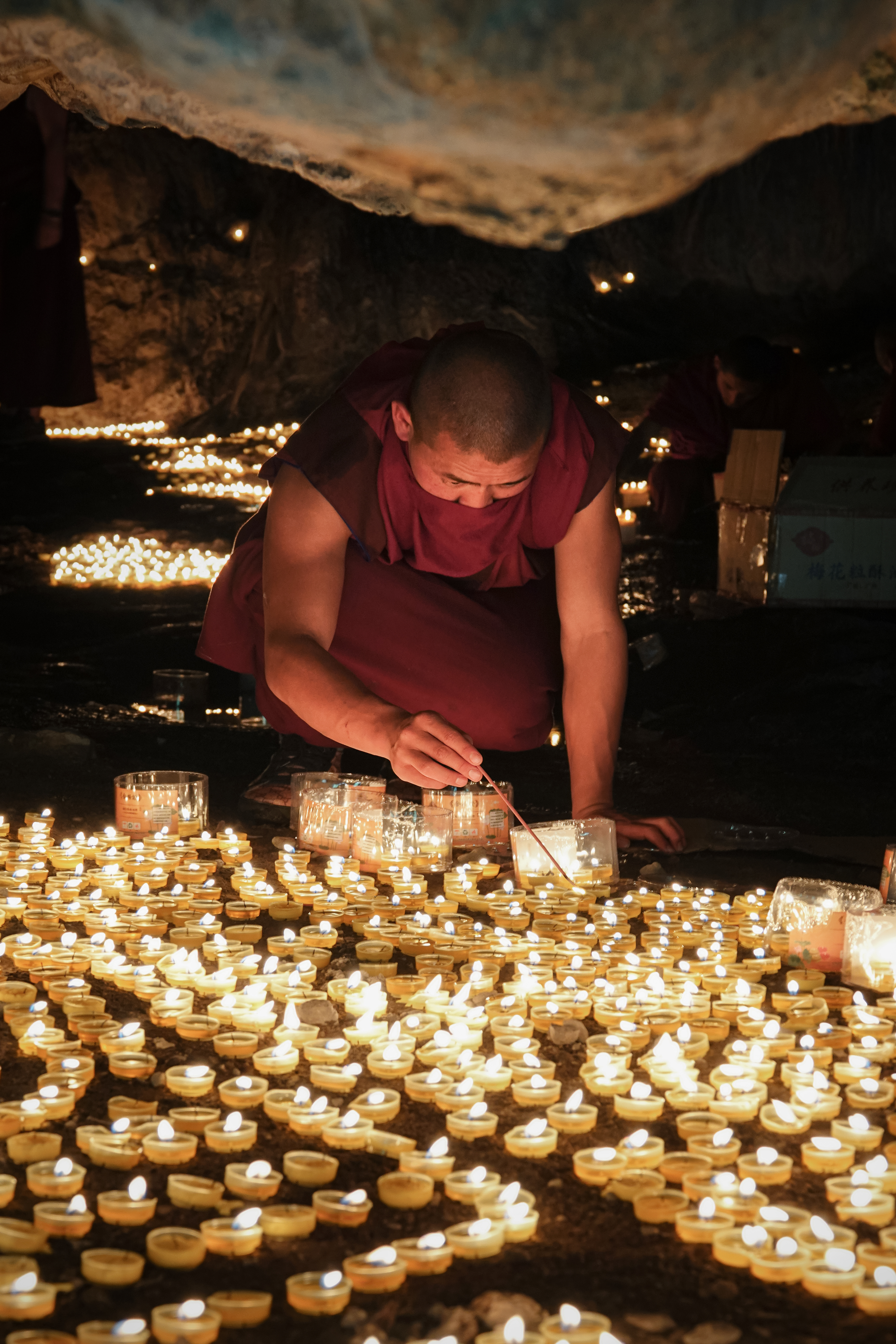
A Tibetan pilgrim lighting ghee lamps in a sacred cave on the Tibet plateau

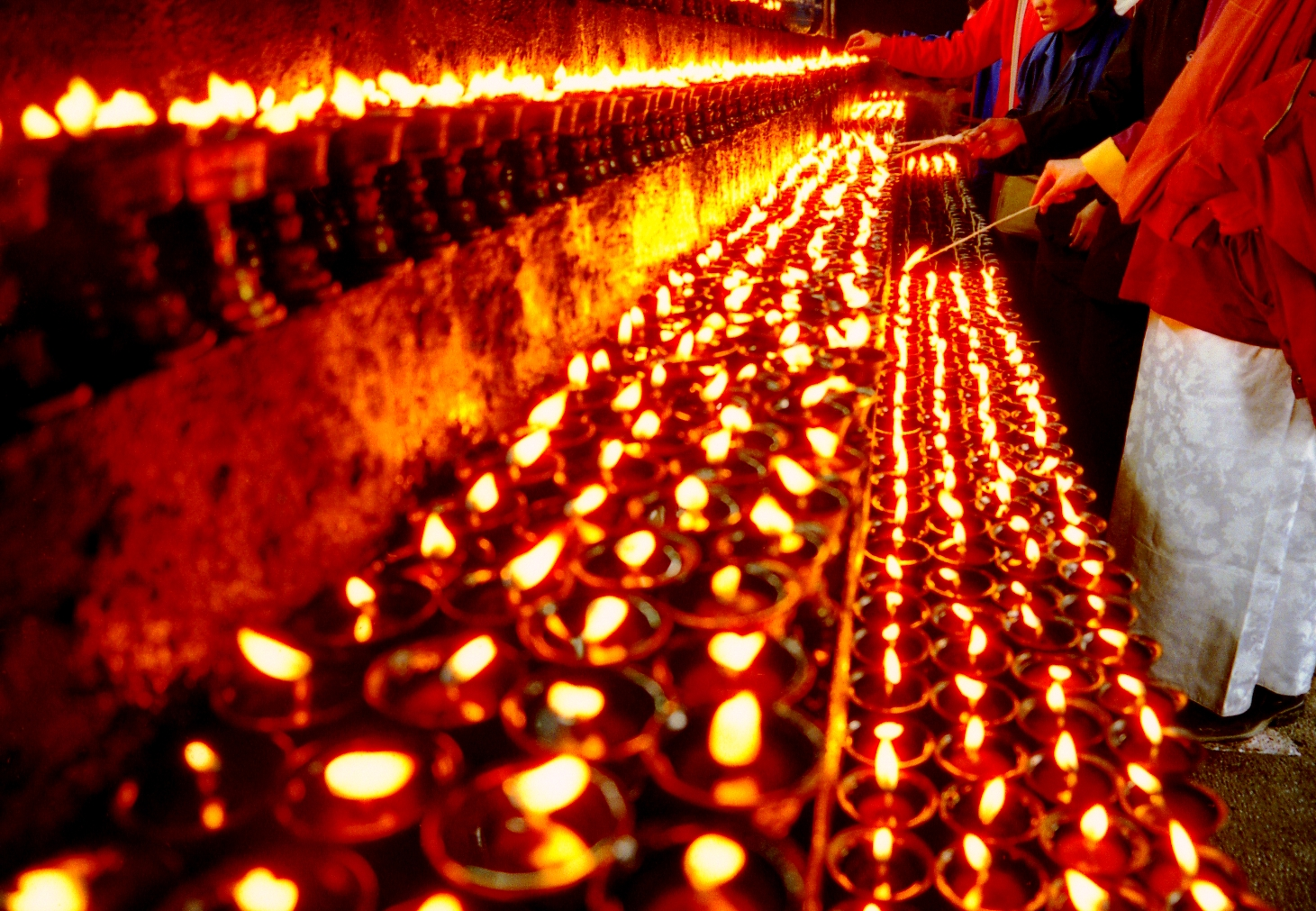
Lighting butter lamps

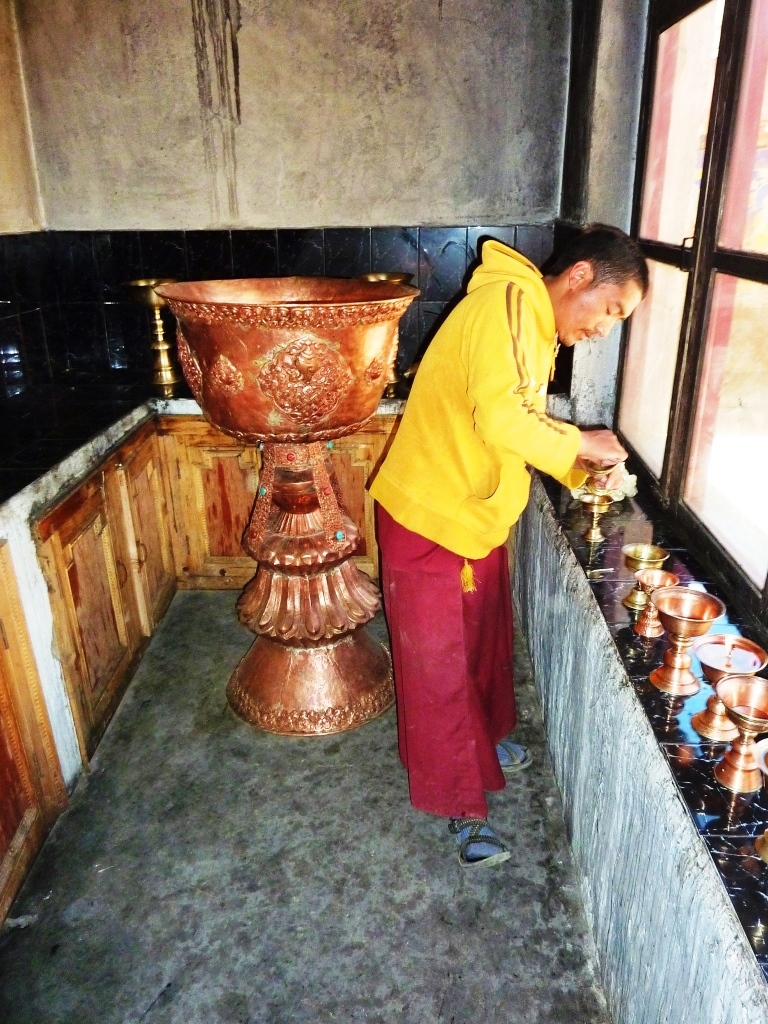
Preparing butter lamps at Takthok Monastery. 2010

Butter lamps or butterlamps (Tibetan: དཀར་མེ་, Wylie: dkar me; simplified Chinese: 酥油灯; traditional Chinese: 酥油燈; pinyin: sūyóu dēng) are a common feature of Tibetan Buddhist temples and monasteries throughout the Himalayas. The lamps traditionally burn clarified yak butter, but now often use vegetable oil or vanaspati ghee.

The butter lamps help to focus the mind and aid meditation. According to the Root tantra of Cakrasaṃvara Tantra, "If you wish for sublime realization, offer hundreds of lights".

Pilgrims also supply lamp oil to gain merit. The monks in the monastery manage the actual lamps, taking extreme care to avoid starting one of the devastating fires which have damaged many monasteries over the years (e.g.,). For safety, butter lamps are sometimes restricted to a separate courtyard enclosure with a stone floor.

Externally, the lights are seen to banish darkness. Conceptually, they convert prosaic substance into illumination, a transformation akin to the search for enlightenment. Esoterically, they recall the heat of the tummo yoga energy of the Six Yogas of Naropa, an important text for Kagyu, Gelug, and Sakya schools of tantric Buddhism.

== See also ==
- List of light sources
- Chotrul Duchen (Butter Lamp Festival)
- Nachiarkoil lamp
- Sky lantern
