= Negodong Nunnery =

Tibetan Buddhist hermitage near Lhasa, Tibet, China

- Location within Tibet

Religion
- Affiliation: Tibetan Buddhism

Location
- Location: Lhasa Prefecture, Tibet, China
- Country: China
- Interactive map of Negodong Nunnery
- Coordinates: 29°43′08″N 91°10′03″E

Architecture
- Established: 16th century. Became nunnery in the 1930s or 1940s.

Negodong Nunnery is a historical hermitage, belonging to Sera Monastery. It is located in the northeastern Lhasa suburb known as Dodé Valley (Dog bde), northeast of Sera, Tibet. Buddhist scholar of the Sera Jé College's (Grwa tshang byes) Gomdé Regional House (Sgom sde khang tshan), Nam mkha’ rgyal mtshan. It was initially founded as a monastery with seventeen monks but later allotted for exclusive use as nunnery to provide personal security to the nuns who were then residing in a remote nunnery at Gnas nang (higher valley to the east), away from the present location at Gnas sgo gdong (about an hour's walk).

== Geography ==
The nunnery situated in a mountainous landscape has assigned religious significance to each of the hills surrounding it. The black rocky mountain, in the shape of a triangle, to the east of the nunnery, is said to represent the protector deity of the nunnery, Lha mo nyi gzhon. This mountain is also credited as the “Three Great Mountains” (Ri chen gsum) on the periphery of Lhasa. The Northern boundary of the nunnery is known as the Soul-Mountain of Juniper Forests" (Shug pa’i nags bla ri), for the reason that juniper trees were in abundance here (higher slopes of the mountain still have some juniper trees). Two other hill peaks were used to hoist religious flags and to make burnt junifer offerings on the third day of the Tibetan New Year. The water sources sourced here are two springs with the names, the Ravine Spring (Grog mo chu mig) and the Sound-Catcher (or Ear) Spring (Sgra ’dzin chu mig) which are stated to have some curative properties.

== History ==
The known history of the place is linked to the Jé College's (Grwa tshang byes) Gomdé Regional House (Sgom sde khang tshan), Nam mkha’rgyal mtshan (1532–1592) who built it initially as his retreat. Its conversion into a formal monastery is conjectured as some date in the eighteenth century, after the Mkhar rdo was founded an dit was founded with some seventeen monks initially. Its conversion into a nunnery is related to the security concerns expressed by the nuns who were the staying in a remote area called the Gnas nang. Their security concern was resolved by interchanging their home with that of the monks who were then staying at Gnas sgo gdong. This switch happened in the 1930s or early 1940s; however, the exact year is not clear. Concurrently, a Tibetan government's money printing press (ngul gyi par khang) was also shifted from Dog bde and located close to the nunnery. However, the Khardo Lama's estate bought the entire complex of buildings here resulting in creation of a larger estate facility, where the nuns were also housed. Following the creation of the larger facility as the Khardo Lama's estate, the Tibetan Government intervened and impounded all the properties of the Rwa sgreng, the owner of the estate, due to some impropriety of a serious nature. Subsequently, the nuns were moved back to their original residence (which had been converted into a mansion). The Tibetan government thereafter, around 1949–50, demolished all the estate buildings, and then shifted the nuns to the printing press building. After 1959, the nunnery was almost destroyed. However, a dedicated nun of the Negodong Nunnery went round the country seeking financial help to rebuild the nunnery, which is now seen rebuilt.

The nunnery now functions as a practice centre (sgrub sde) along with Khardo Hermitage (Mkhar rdo ri khrod) and Gnas nang.

== Structure ==
The buildings of the nunnery complex consist of two temples; the front one with a porch and another bigger one with an assembly room and a chapel to keep scriptures, known in Tibetan as 'Bka’ ’gyur lha khang'. A kitchen and a storage room were part of the complex. Nuns were provided with a dormitory, a three storied building, located behind the main temple. A reception room, an office room for the administrator (a senior nun), and a protector deity chapel form part of the main temple, all located on the second floor. More buildings have been built in recent years to the north east of the temple, which form the housing complex for the nuns and it has an adjunct chapel.

Prior to 1959, the main idol, donated by the Seventh Dalai Lama Kelzang Gyatso (Da lai bla ma sku phreng bdun pa bskal bzang rgya mtsho), was that of Lokeshvara, which was carved out of sandalwood and crowned by an image of Padmasambhava. However, given that the previous monastery and its artefacts were largely destroyed, the idols are now new. Lha mo nyi ma gzhon is the protector deity of the nunnery.
