= Sera Monastery =

Buddhist monastery near Lhasa, Tibet, China

Séra Monastery
- Tibetan transcription(s); Tibetan: སེ་ར་ཐེག་ཆེན་གླིང་། Wylie transliteration: se ra theg chen gling Chinese transcription(s); Traditional: 色拉寺; Simplified: 色拉寺
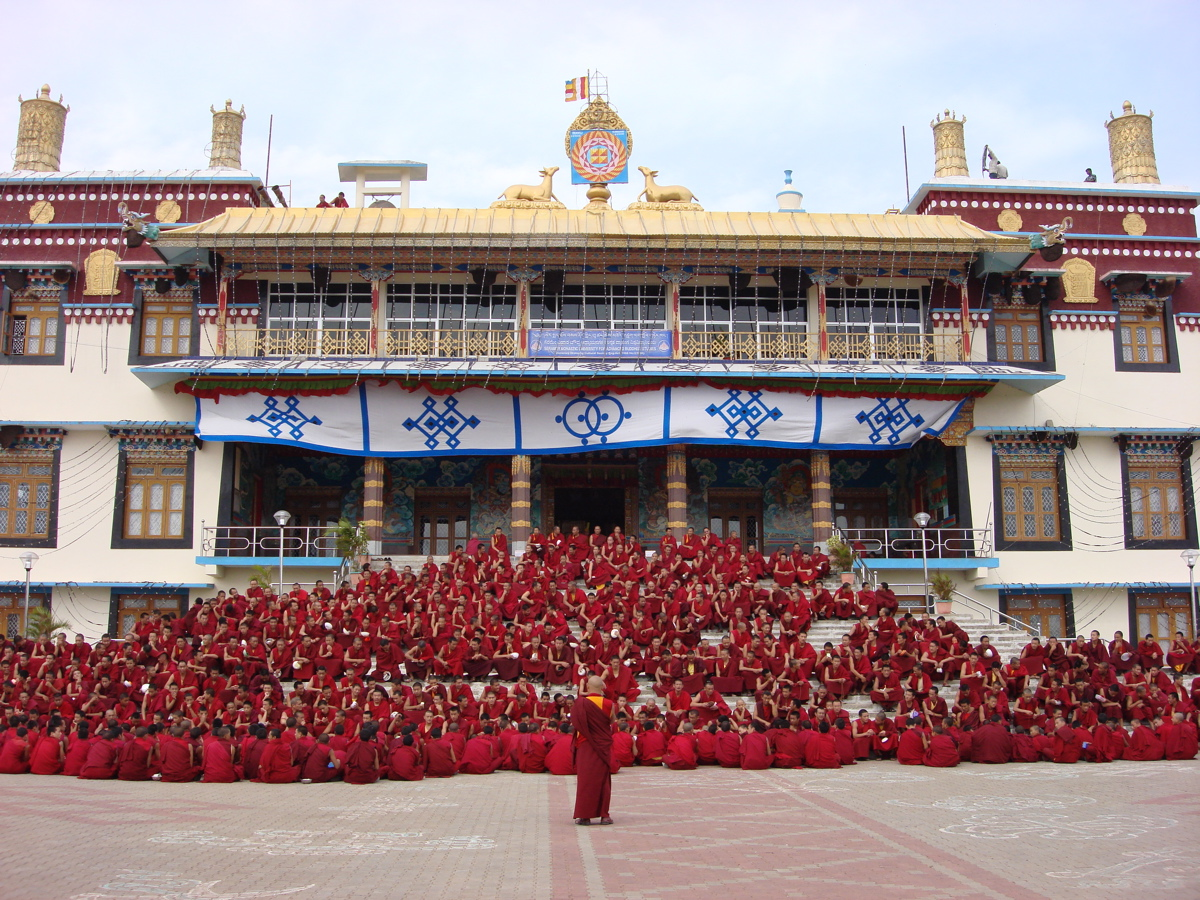
- Monks assembled outside the Sera Me Tratsang college of Sera Monastery in India in December 2006.

- Location within Tibet Autonomous Region

Religion
- Affiliation: Tibetan Buddhism
- Sect: Gelug
- Deity: Je Tsongkhapa

Location
- Location: Wangbur Mountain, Lhasa, Tibet Autonomous Region, China
- Country: China
- Coordinates: 29°41′53″N 91°8′0″E

Architecture
- Founder: Jamchen Chojey
- Established: 1419; 607 years ago
- Completed: 1419
- Its counterpart set up at Bylakuppe, near Mysore in Karnataka by Tibetan diaspora

Sera Monastery (Tibetan: སེ་ར་དགོན་པ, Wylie: se ra dgon pa "Wild Roses Monastery"; Chinese: 色拉寺; pinyin: Sèlā Sì) is one of the "great three" Gelug university monasteries of Tibet, located 1.25 miles (2.01 km) north of Lhasa and about 5 km (3.1 mi) north of the Jokhang. (The other two are Ganden Monastery and Drepung Monastery.) The original Sera Monastery is responsible for some 19 hermitages, including four nunneries, which are all located in the foothills north of Lhasa.

The Sera Monastery, as a complex of structures with the Great Assembly Hall and three colleges, was founded in 1419 by Jamchen Chojey of Sakya Yeshe of Zel Gungtang (1355–1435), a disciple of Je Tsongkhapa. During the 1959 revolt in Lhasa, Sera monastery suffered severe damage, with its colleges destroyed and hundreds of monks killed. The origin of its name is attributed to a fact that during construction, the hill behind the monastery was covered with blooming wild roses (or "sera" in Tibetan). (An alternate etymology holds that the location that was surrounded by raspberry shrubs called 'Sewa' in Tibetan, that formed like a 'Rawa' in Tibetan, meaning "Fence".)

After the Dalai Lama took asylum in India, many of the monks of Sera who survived the attack moved to Bylakuppe in Mysore, India. After initial tribulations, they established a parallel Sera Monastery with Sera Me and Sera Je colleges and a Great Assembly Hall on similar lines to the original monastery, with help from the Government of India. There are now 3000 or more monks living in Sera, India and this community has also spread its missionary activities to several countries by establishing Dharma centres, propagating knowledge of Buddhism.

== Background ==
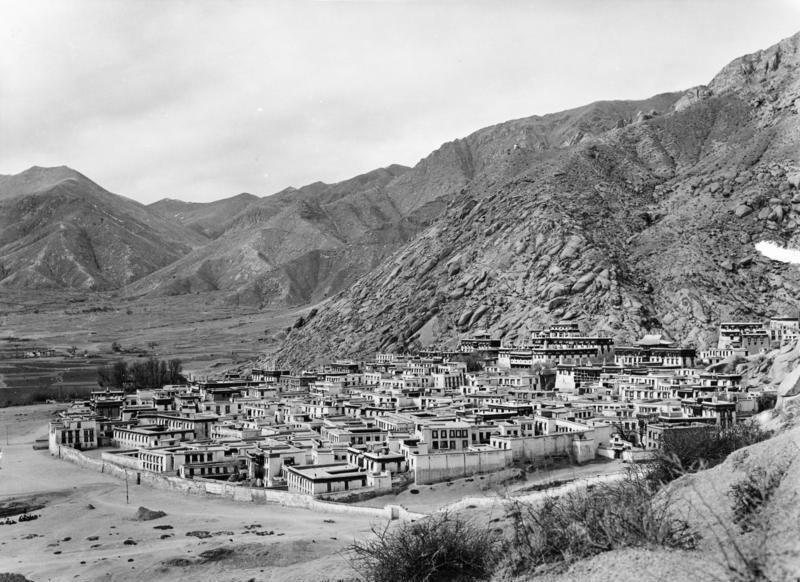
Sera Monastery in 1938

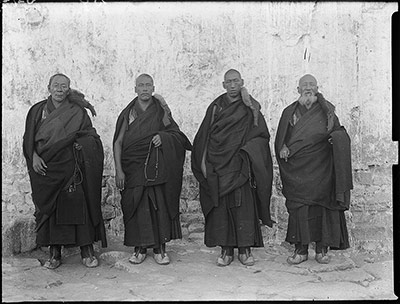
Abbots of Sera Monastery, 1920-1921

The original Sera Monastery is a complex of structures founded in 1419 by Jamchen Chojey Sakya Yeshe of Zel Gungtang (1355–1435), a disciple of Je Tsongkhapa. Prior to establishing this monastery, Tsongkhapa, assisted by his disciples, had set up hermitages at higher elevations above Sera Utsé Hermitage.

The Sera complex is divided into two sectors by pathways; the eastern part contains the Great Assembly Hall and the dwellings and the western part has the well-known three colleges: the Sera Je Dratsang, the Sera Me Dratsang; and the Ngakpa Dratsang, all instituted by Tsongkhapa as monastic universities that catered to monks in the age range 8-70. All the structures within this complex formed a clockwise pilgrimage circuit, starting with the colleges (in the order stated), followed by the hall, the dwelling units and finally ending at the hermitage of Tsongkhapa above the Great Assembly Hall.

The Jé and Mé colleges were established to train monks, over a 20-year programme of tsennyi mtshan nyid grwa tshang (philosophical knowledge), which concludes with a geshe degree. The Ngakpa college, which predated the other two colleges, was exclusively devoted to the practice of tantric ritual. Before 1959, the administration of each college comprised an abbot with council of ten lamas for each college.

Over the years, the monastery developed into a hermitage where about 6000 monks resided. The monastery was one of the finest locations in Tibet to witness the debate sessions, which were held according to a fixed schedule. The monastery belongs to the Gelug Order and was one of the largest in Lhasa.

== History ==
The history of the monastery is strongly connected to Master Lama Tsongkhapa (1357–1419), the founder of the Gelukpa Order, a much-venerated and highly-learned guru in Buddhist scriptures. It was under his tutelage — seen by followers as divine — that his disciple Jetsun Kunkhen Lodroe Rinchen Senge established the Sera Jey Monastery complex in the early 15th century AD. Kunkhyen Lodroe Rinchen Senge initially served as a teacher in the Drepung Monastery before he formed the Sera Jey.

The religious legend holds that the site was chosen because Tsongkhapa had a vision in which he saw the full text of Prajnaparamita's 20 slokas on Shunyata captioned in the sky. This vision gave him a full insight into the Tsawasehrab (Fundamentals of Madhyamika or Shunyata) text.

Further, he also perceived the "vision of a rain like 'AA' characters descending from the sky". It was only 12 years later that one of his pupils, Jamchen Choje, fulfilled the prophecy of his guru by establishing the Sera Je as a seat of learning knowledge of the complete teachings and practices of the Mahayana tradition.

King Nedong Dagpa Gyaltsen supported the noble venture with required finances. In 1419, he performed the foundation laying ceremony for construction of the monastery. Lama Tsongkhapa oversaw further details including installing sacred images, idols, and other objects of worship. The monastery soon came to be known as "the Seat of Theckchen ling (Mahayana Tradition)".

=== Post-1959 events ===
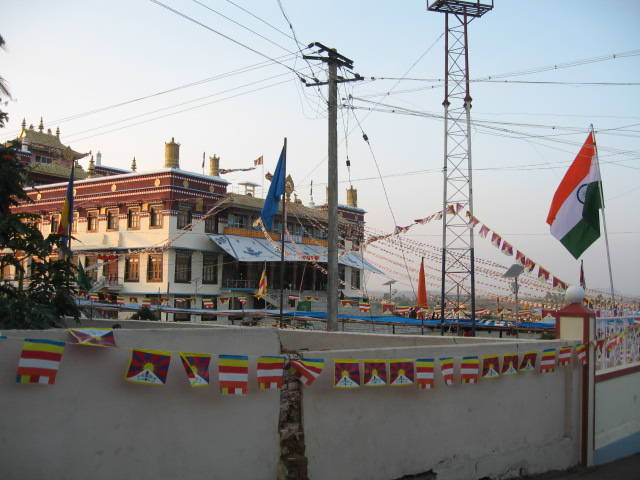
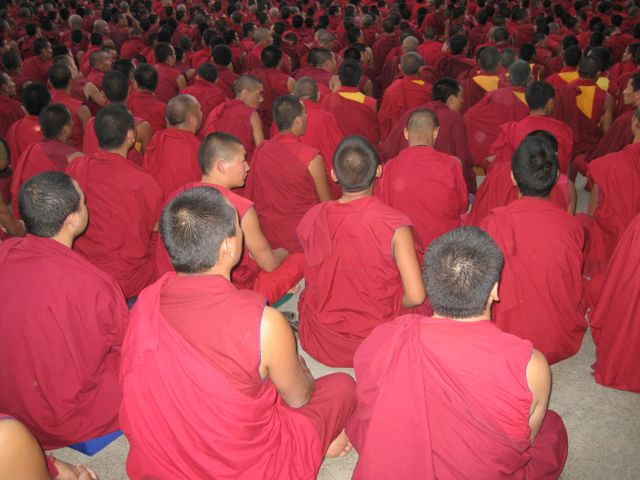
Left: Sera Monastery, India at Bylakuppe, Mysore. Right: The Debate session in Bylakuppe during winter, a practice inherited from the Tibet Sera

The 14th Dalai Lama fled to India in 1959 and sought asylum there. Starting from 18 March, Sera Jey Monastery was subject to bombardment, which resulted in death of hundreds of monks (in 1959, the count of monks living in Sera Jey was 5629), apart from destruction of ancient texts and loss of innumerable, invaluable, ancient and antique works of art. Many of those who survived (monks and common people) this onslaught by the Chinese fled to India, under severe winter weather conditions, across the Himalayas. Following this mass exodus of people from Tibet (including, a few hundred Sera Jey lamas, geshes and monks), when they arrived in India, they were resettled at Bylakuppe near Mysore, Karnataka state among many other locations spread across the country, as one of the exclusive Tibetan establishments with ready assistance forthcoming from the Government of India.

It was in 1970 that the group of 197 Sera Jey monks with 103 of Sera Mey monks established a special monastery within the resettlement of Bylakuppe as a counterpart of the Tibetan Sera Jey Monastery. As none of the monks of the Ngagpa Dratsang (Tantric College) had survived the invasion, only the Sera Mey College and Sera Jey College were re-formed in India. The Bylakuppe Monastery now houses 5,000 Buddhist monks comprising some migrants and many other Tibetans who were not born in their ancestral homeland.

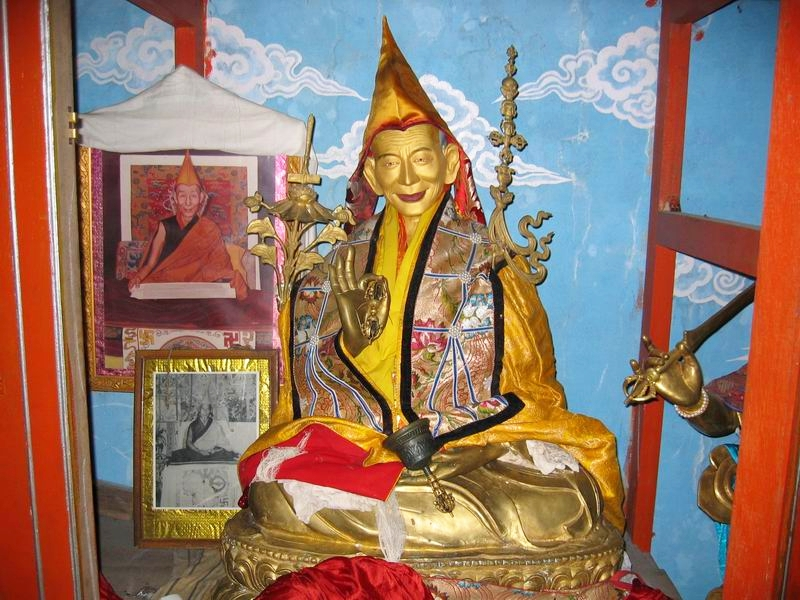
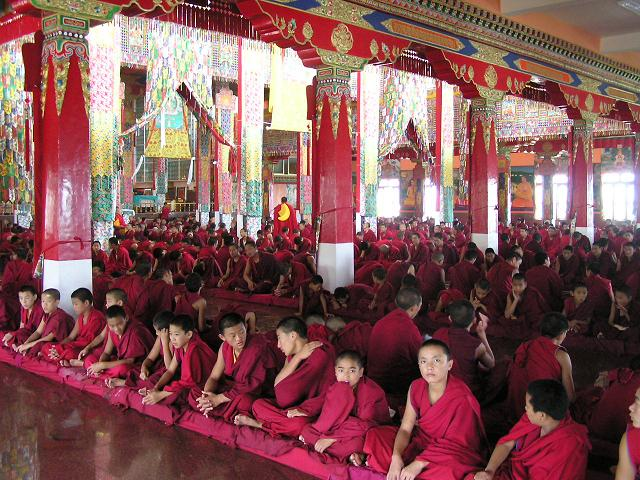
Left: Statue of Trijang Rinpoche, tutor of the present 14th Dalai Lama, Sera Mey Monastery, Bylakuppe, India.. Right: Monks in the Assembly Hall of Sera Mey in Bylakuppe

With forest land allotted by the Government of India, two arms of the Sera Monastery, representing the migrant monks of the Tibetan Sera Je and Sera Me colleges were established; 193 Sera je monks got 147.75 acres (59.79 ha) and 107 monks of Sera Me got an allotment of the balance area. Further, 38 tenements were built with grants by the Government of India for the Monks to reside and pursue their vocation of monkshood coupled with tilling the surrounding allotted land for raising food crops for survival. Well established as an organised Monastery with dedicated efforts of the monks, an Assembly Prayer Hall that could accommodate 1500 monks was also completed in 1978. This Monastery is now the nodal monastery, with its affiliation to several smaller monasteries spread across various regions in Tibet; its popularity could be gauged by the 3000 or more monks living here now. Encouraged by this success and noting the pressure on existing infrastructure, an additional, much larger and an impressive Assembly hall (measuring 23,275 square feet (2,162.3 m^{2}), 31 feet (9.4 m) high with 110 pillars) has been built that can accommodate 3500 monks to assemble for prayers. With this development, Sera has now two facets, the original “Tibetan Sera” and the Bylakuppe “New Sera” of the “Tibetan Diaspora” with the counterpart Jé, Mé monasteries, with the Ngakpa college counterpart also added recently. The Sera-India monk community of the Bylakuppe Monastery, has gone global with their missionary activity by establishing “dharma centres” in many parts the world, thus removing the cultural isolation of pre-1959 years in Tibet.

== Geography ==
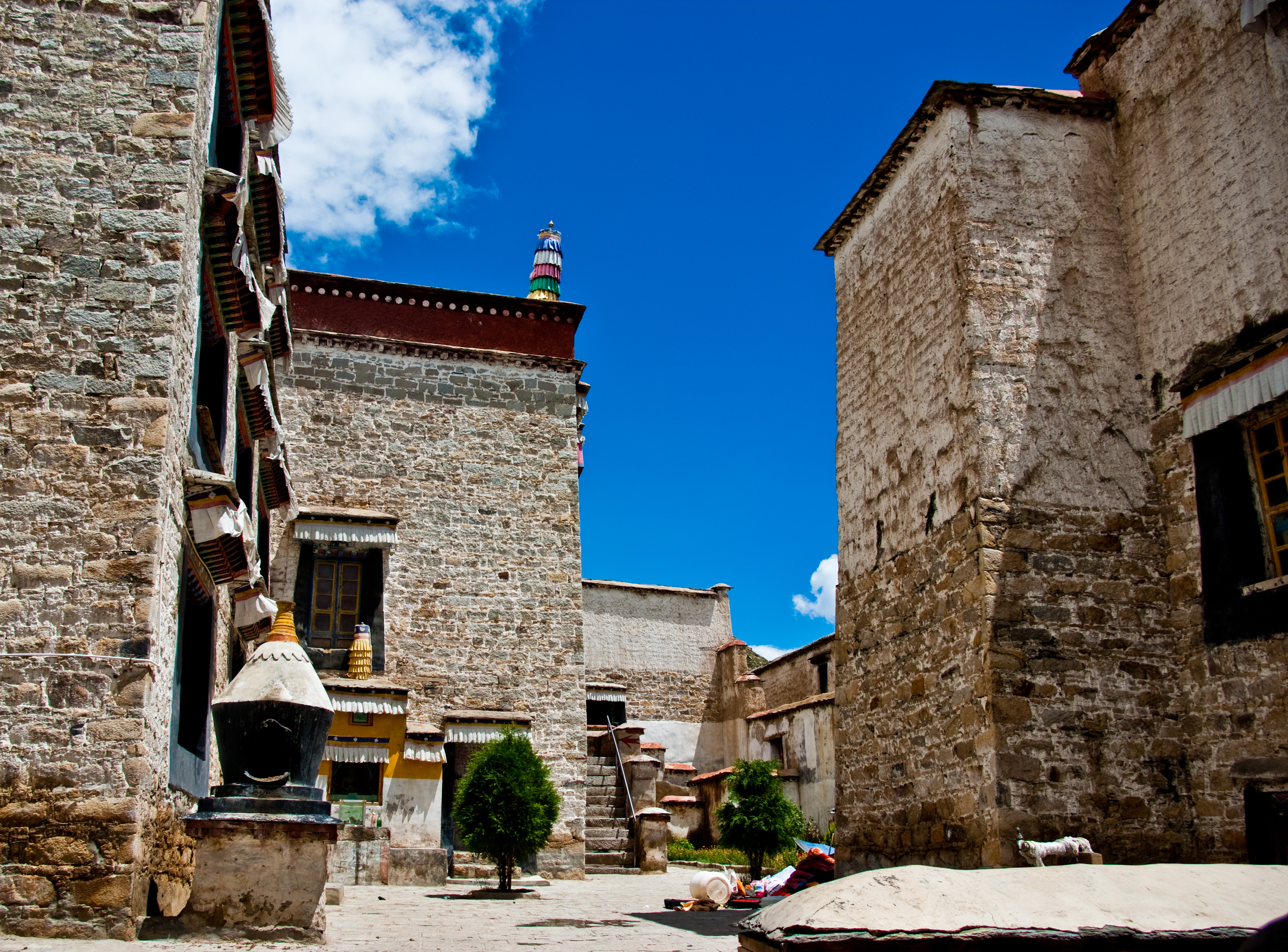
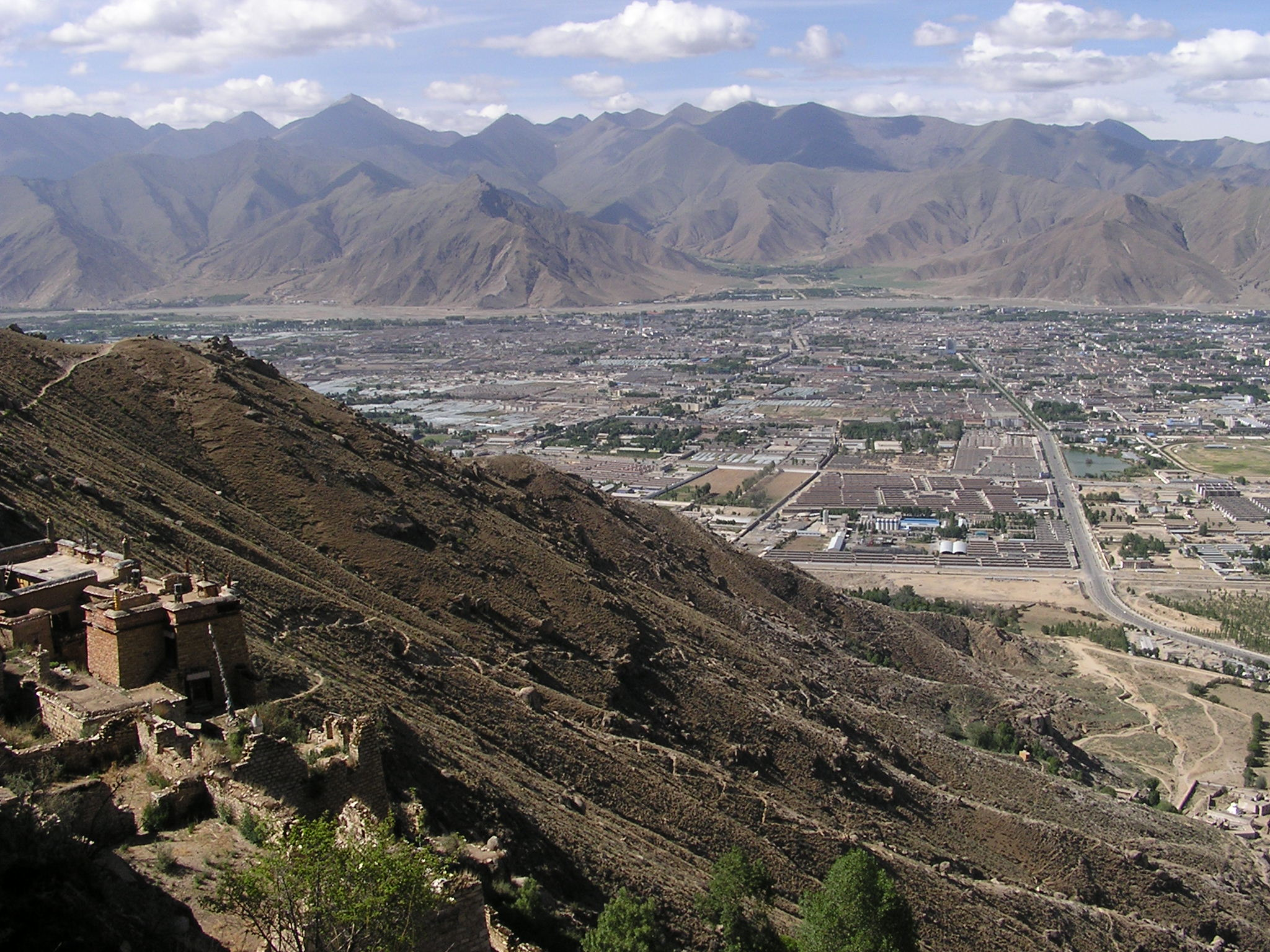
Left: Monastery complex. Right: Retreat House of Sera Monastery and Lhasa valley down below.

The monastery is located on the northern outskirts of Lhasa, the capital of Tibet Autonomous Region. As built in 1419, it encompassed an area of 28 acres (11 ha).

Its geographical location is at the base of Pubuchok mountain, also known as Tatipu Hill, located in the northern suburb of Lhasa City, which forms the watershed of the basins formed by Kyi Chi and Penpo Chu rivers.

== Architecture ==
The monastery complex, encompassing 28 acres (11 ha) of land, housed several institutions in its precincts. The structures of notability were the Coqen Hall Tsokchen (Great Assembly Hall), the three Zhacangs (colleges) and Kamcun (dormitory) also called Homdong Kangtsang. In the main hall, scriptures (scripted with gold powder), statues, scent cloth and murals were seen in profusion. The descriptions given here relate to the scenario that existed at the monastery prior to the 1959 invasion by China but most of the monasteries are stated to be since restored, though the strength of the monks are said to be small.

=== Great Assembly Hall ===
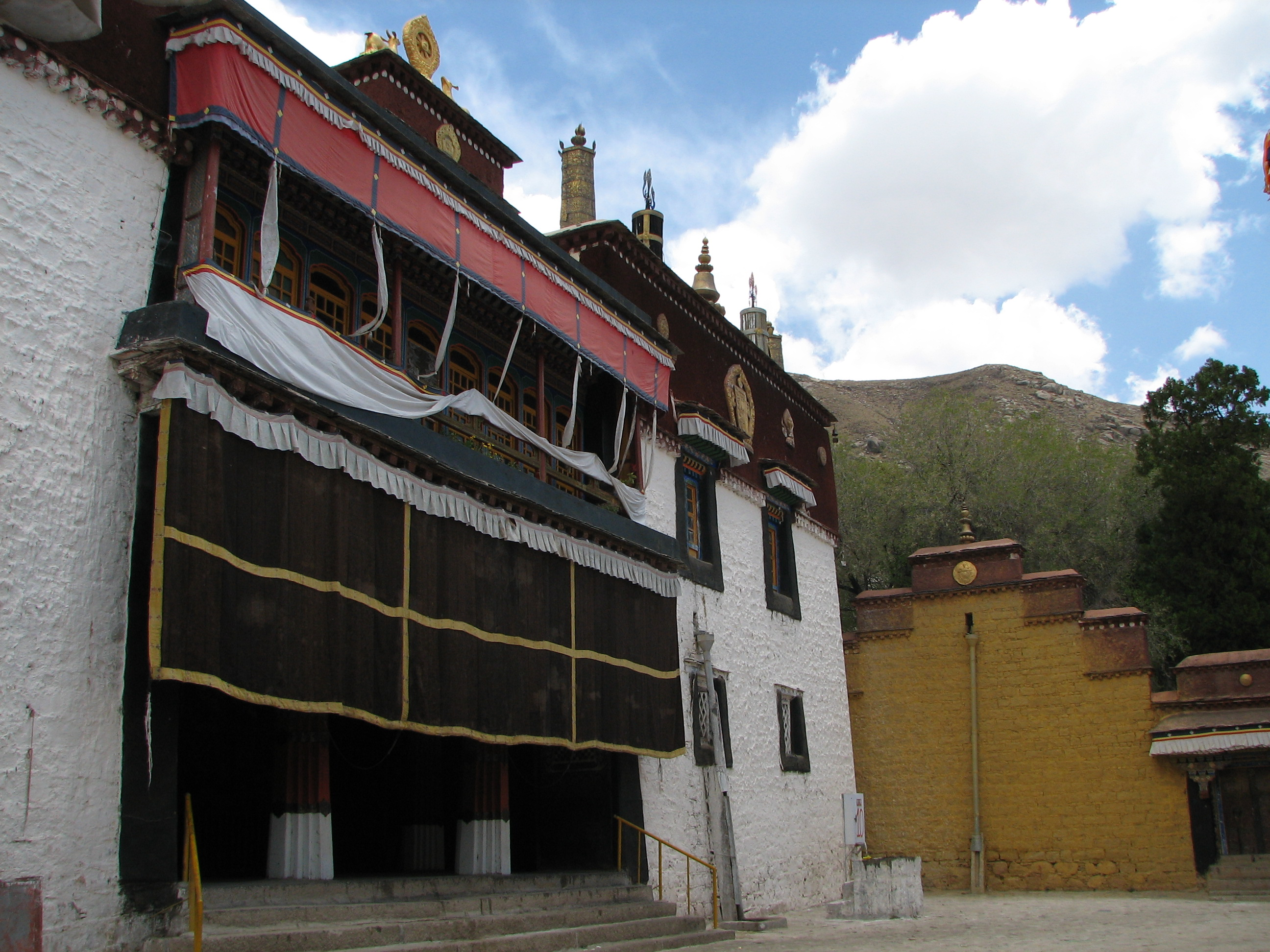
Sera Monastery

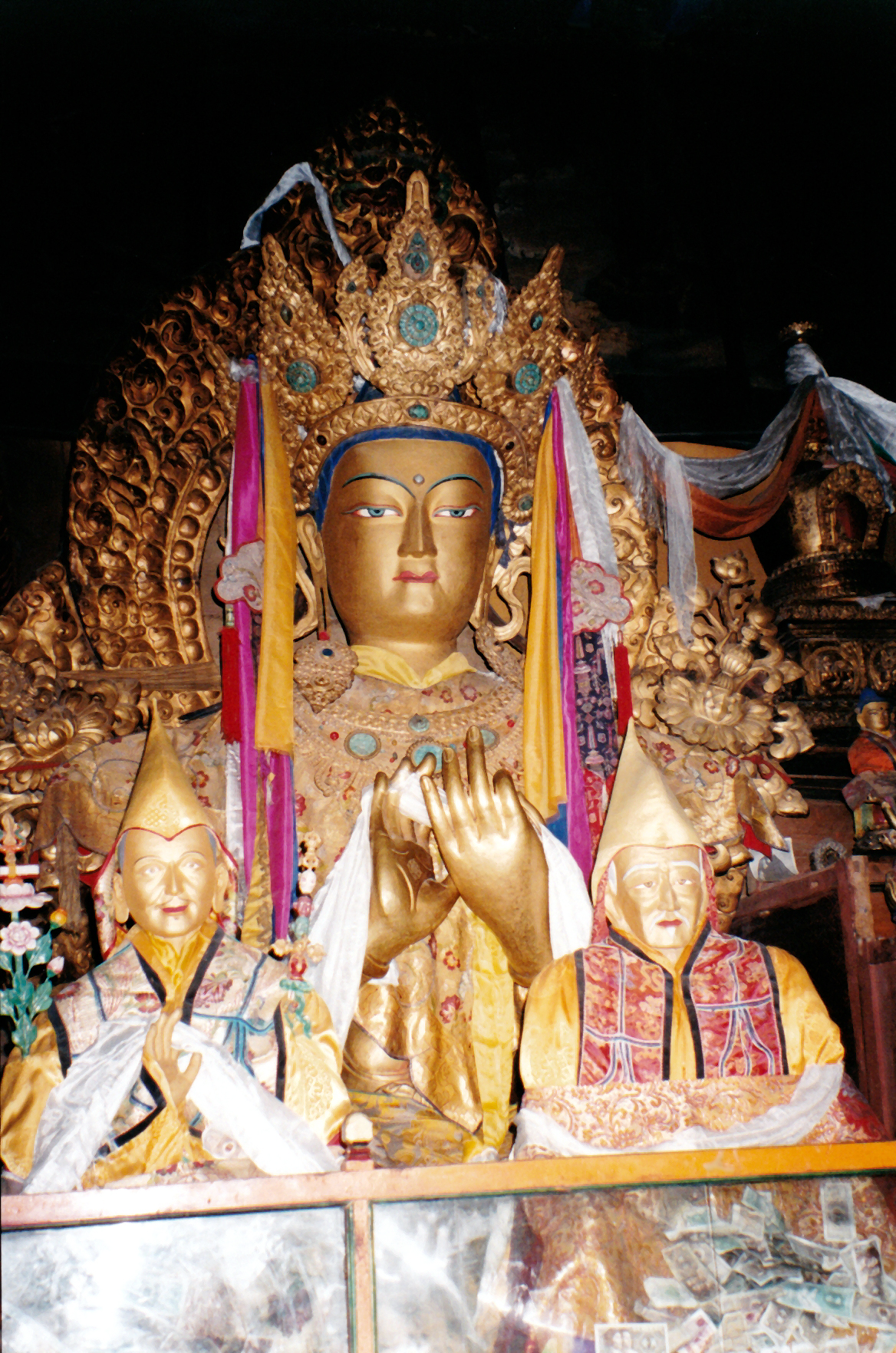
Gilt images of a bodhisattva and lamas in Sera Monastery

The Great Assembly Hall, the ‘Tsokchen' or 'Coqen Hall', dated to 1710, a four-story structure to the north east of the monastery, facing east, is where several religious rituals and rites are conducted. The hall measured an area of 2,000 square metres (22,000 ft^{2}) built with 125 pillars (86 tall and 39 short columns) and was constructed by Lhazang Qan. The entry portico had ten columns.

The five chapels in this building have statues or images of Maitreya, Shakyamuni, Arhats, Tsongkhapa, and Kwan-yin with one thousand hands and eleven faces. The ancient and delicately written scriptures ‘the Gangyur of Tripitaka’ also spelt 'Kangyur' (dated 1410) in 105 volumes (original 108 volumes) written in Tibetan is the treasured possession of the monastery. It is said that Chengzhu, emperor of the Ming dynasty, presented these scriptures (printed on wood blocks with gold cover engraved in red lacquer and made in China) to Jamchen Chojey, the builder of the monastery.

The entrance to the hall was through a portico built on 10 columns. Large appliqué Thangkas were suspended from the ceiling on the side walls. A skylight at the centre provided the light in the hall during the day. Image of the founder of the monastery Jamchen Choje Shakya Yeshe was deified as the central image. Other deities installed were of Maitreya (5 metres (16 ft) height and gilded) flanked by statues of two lions, Dalai Lamas V, VII and XII, Tsongkhapa (with his favourite disciples), Chokyi Gyeltsen, Desi Sangye Gyatso and many more.

The three inner chapels, sequentially, are the Jampa Lhakhang, the Neten Lhakhang and Jigje Lhakhang. A 6 metres (20 ft) high image of Maitreya was deified in Jampa Lhakhang ensconced by Eight Bodhisattvas, the treasured Kagyur and guarded by Hayagriva and Acala at the entrance. Jigje Lhakhang houses the image of Bhairava with his consort Bhairavi, Shri Devi and other protector deities.

On the second floor, there were three chapels: the Zhelre Lhakhang from where Maitreya could be seen embossed with a small Tsongkhapa on its heart; the Tu-je Chenpo Lhakhang that had an Avalokiteshvara with eleven faces (found at Pawangka), Tara and six–armed Mahakala. The idol of Shakyamuni Buddha flanked by images of Gelukpa Lamas were placed in the Shakyamuni Lhakhang.

The third and the fourth floors were used as private apartments for the Dalai Lamas and the preceptors of the Main Assembly Hall.

=== Sera Me Tratsang ===
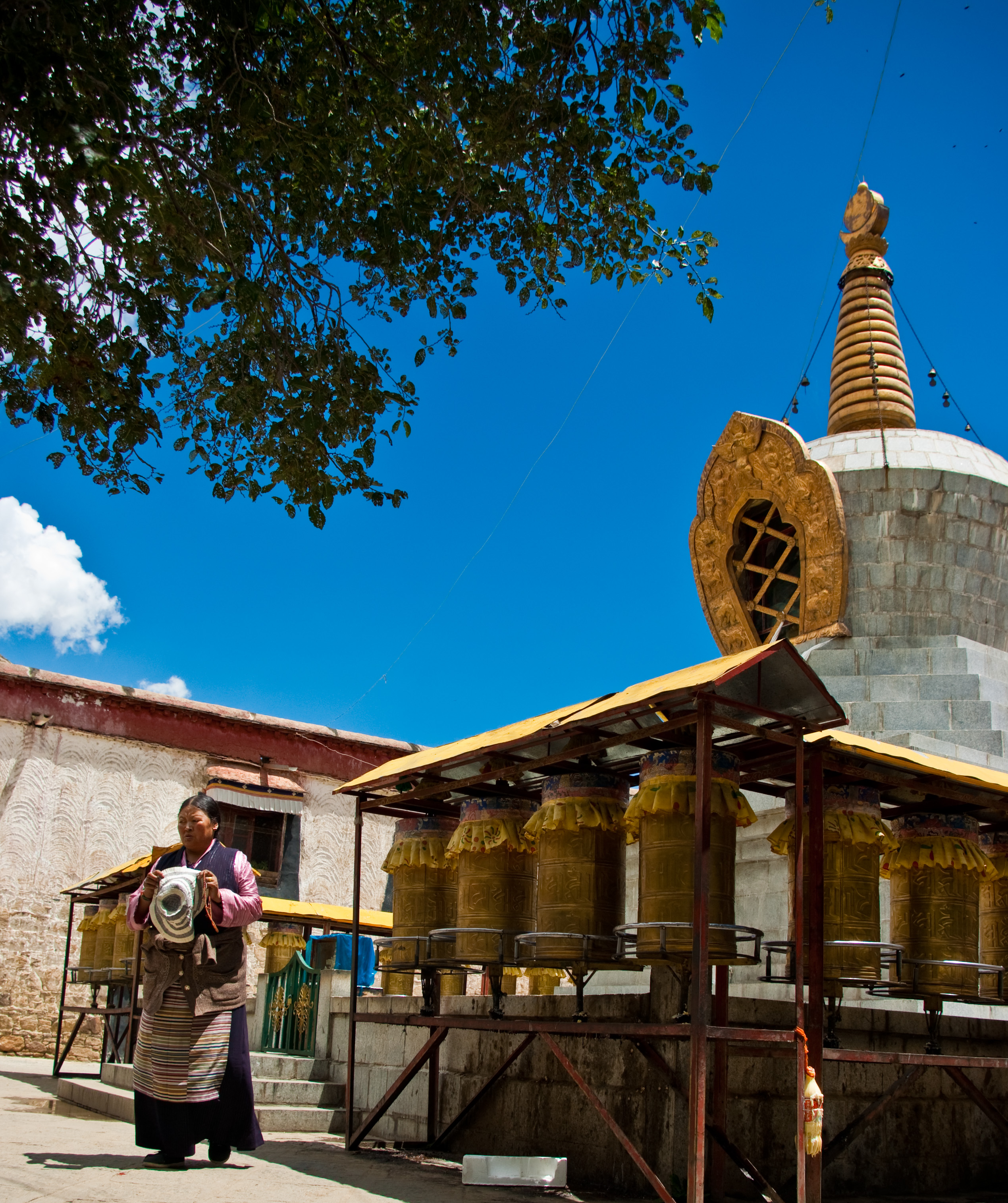
Sera Monastery, 2008

Sera Me Tratsang or Sera Me Zhakan was the oldest college built here. It was established in 1419 during the Ming dynasty reign, initially for elementary or basic education in Buddhist religion. The college adopted a step-by-step approach to the studies of Buddhist doctrines; a practice particular to the Gelukpa or Yellow Hat sect of Tibetan Buddhism. The college was built over an area of 1,600 square metres (17,000 ft^{2}) with 30 dwelling units. However, in 1761 lightning struck the main hall which was rebuilt in 1761. The hall, as finally refurbished, had 70 pillars (8 tall and 62 short pillars) which housed a galaxy of statues of Buddhist gurus with the main deity of Shakyamuni Buddha made in copper. The other Bodhisattvas enshrined along with the main deity were of Maitreya, Manjushri, Amatyas, Bhavishyaguru, Tsongkhapa (with his students), Dalai Lama VII, Pawanga Rinpoche and several other past teachers of the college.

The college had five chapels with plethora of statues and frescoes, which from west to east were: Tawok Lhkhang with images of Tawok, protection deity of the east, the Je Rinpoche Lhakhang with images of Tsongkhapa and Shakyamuni, the Neten Lhakhang with images of Buddha of Three Times in the company of 'Sixteen Elders' depicted in their mountain caves, volumes of the sacred Prajnaparamita text; the Jowokhang with large Buddha image (replaced an earlier image of Miwang Jowo Shakyamuni) along with Eight Bodhisattvas, and gatekeepers Hayagriva and Acala; and the Tsongkhapa Lhakhang, the last chapel on the right, with several images – Je Rinpoche, Atisha, Dromtonpa, Dalai Lamas I-III, Dalai Lama V, Jamchen Shakya Yeshe, Gyeltsen Zangpo (first teacher of Sera), Kunkhen Jangchub Penpa (founder of Sera Me) and many more.

The second floor of the college had the Nyima Lhakhang where image of Shakhyamuni Buddha was deified along with Tuwang Tsultrim, and the Khangyur Lhakhang with 1000 images of Tara which replaced the sacred texts that were destroyed during the Cultural Revolution. The third floor was reserved for the Dalai Lamas.

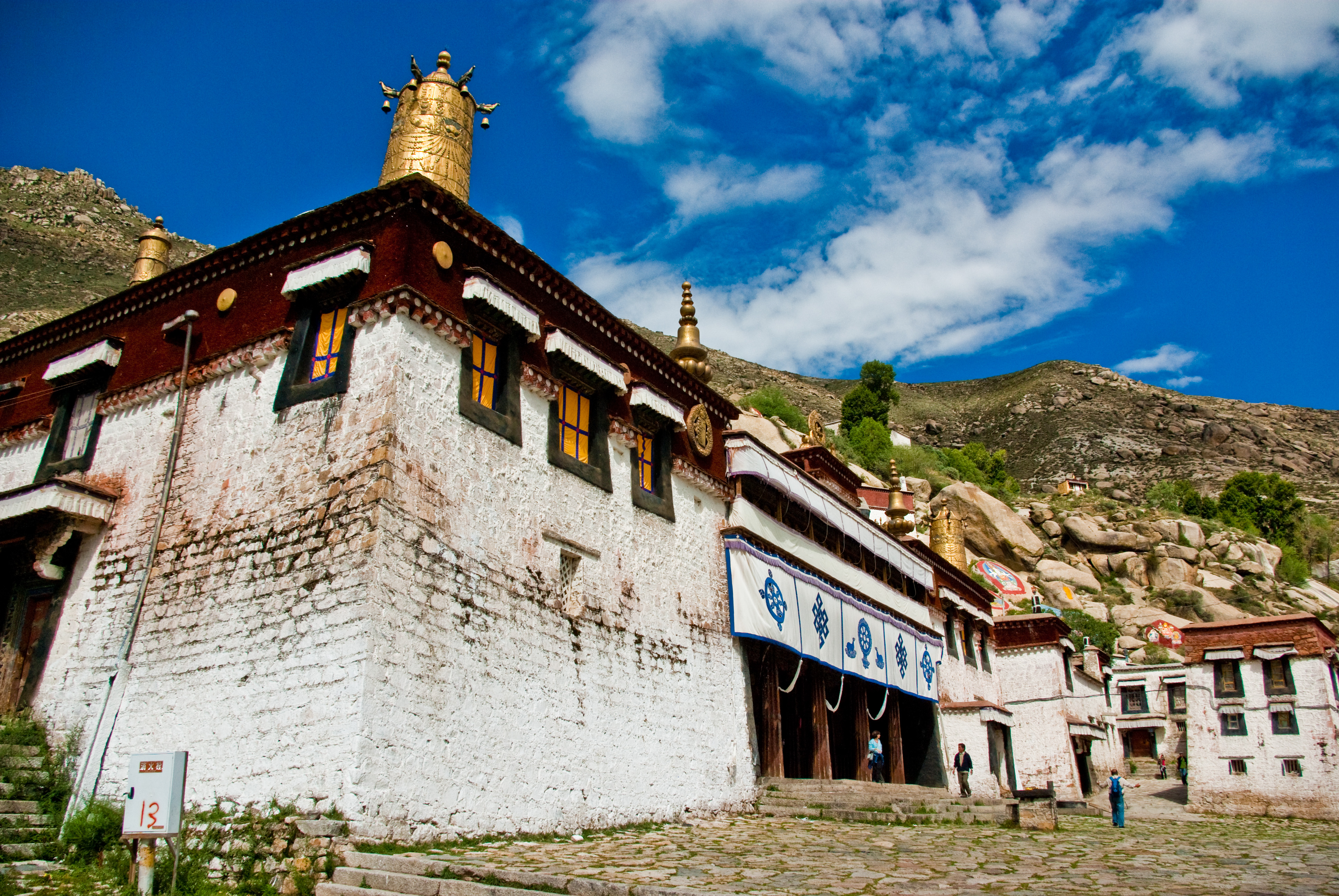
Coqen Hall

=== Sera Je College ===
Sera Je Tretsang (College) or Zhekong, the largest college in Sera complex, measured an area of 17,000 m^{2} (180,000 ft^{2}). It was initially a three storied building; a fourth floor was added in the 18th century by strengthening the building with a total of 100 columns. It had a statue of the Hayagriva (said to have been sculpted by Lodro Rinchen himself in gilded copper), also known popularly as Avalokiteśvara, which was considered the protective deity of the monastery. This wrathful deity was worshipped as dispeller of obstacles with healing powers. Tokden Yonten Gonpo, worshipped this deity first and on divine injunction initiated his son Kunkhepa, to follow this tradition. Kunkhepa, with the blessings of Lama Tsongkhapa, institutionalised the name of Hayagriva or Tamdin Yangsang as the supreme protector deity of the monastery. The assembly hall of the college depicted frescoes of Buddha's life achievements, the thrones of the Dalai Lamas and Panchen Lamas; seen on its north wall were stupas (reliquaries) and images of Dalai Lama VIII and Dalai Lama XIII, Reting Telkus II and IX, and Lodro Rinchen (founder of Sera).

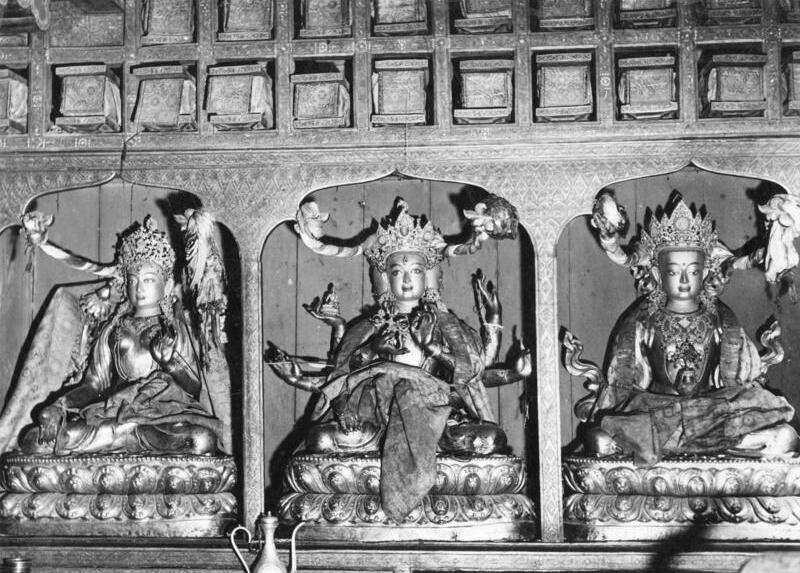
Images of deities in a Chapel in the Sera

The Chapels which were circumambulated sequentially are: the Dusum Sangye Lhakhang which housed statues of “Buddhas of Three Times” and Eight Bodhistavas; the Tamdrin Lhakhang housed the main image of Hayagriva; the Jhampa Lhakhang contained images of Maitreya, Eleven-faced Mahakarunika, and Tsongkhapa with his disciples amidst a coveted library; the Tsongkhapa Lhakhang with images of Tsongkhapa with his best students, main Lamas of Sera Je, Nagarjuna and other Buddhist commentators of India, gate keepers Havagriva and Acala; the Jampeyang Lhakhang to the north-east had two images of Manjushri, one in a Dharmacakramudra (teaching pose) looking towards the Debating Courtyard.

The second floor of the monastery on the west called the Zelre Lhakhang provided an overview of the main Hayagriva image in the floor below, and also a small image of Nine-headed Hayagriva along with images of Padmasambhava, the 5th Dalai Lama and the protector deities. One floor above this was the Namgyel Lhakhang and the last floor above this was the living quarters of the Dalai Lamas and teachers of Sera Je.

=== Ngakpa Tratsang ===
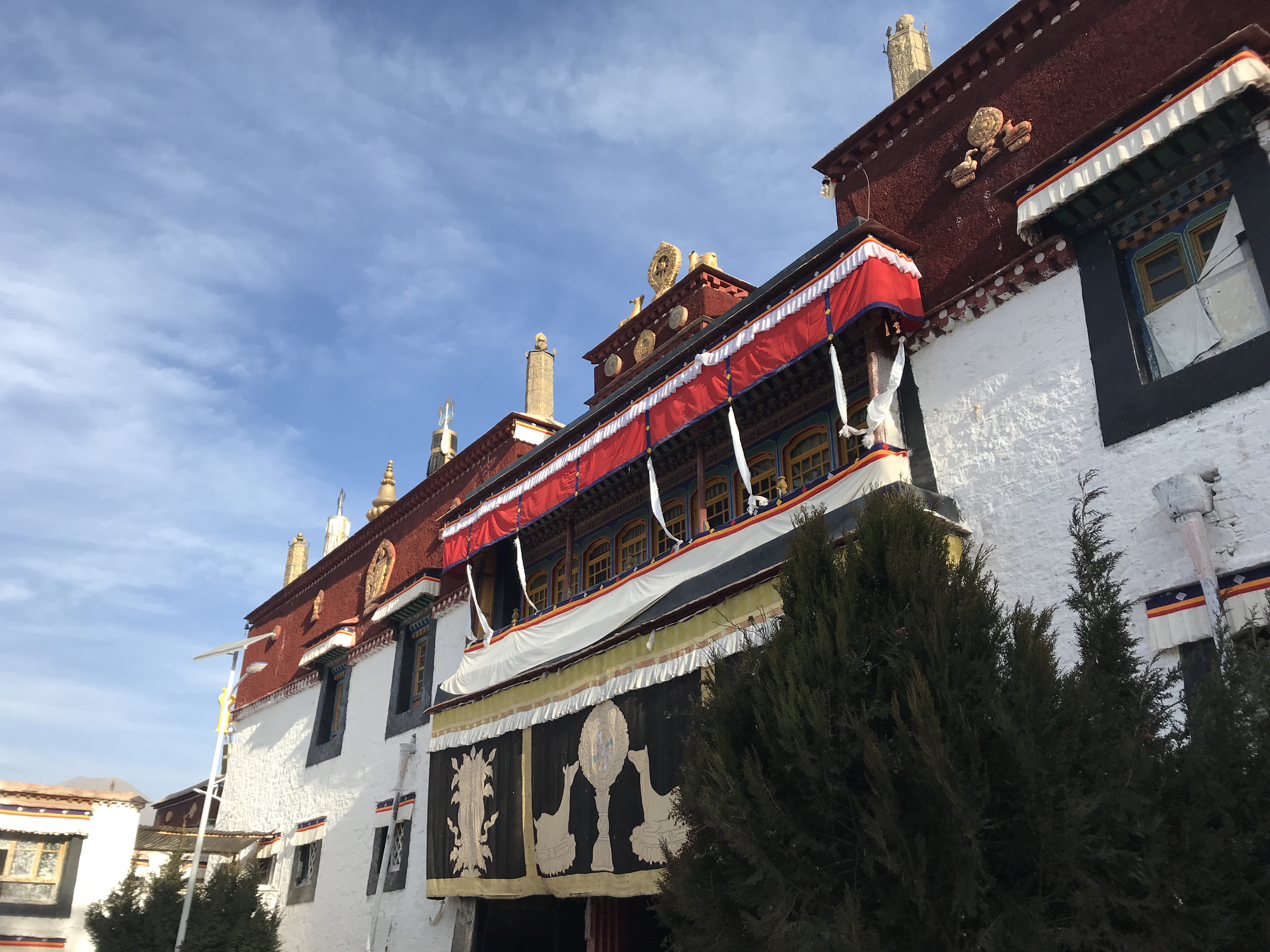
Ngakpa Tratsang.

The Ngakpa Tratsang, also spelled Ngaba Zhacang, was the smallest of the three colleges that was set up in the complex. It was a three storied building originally built in 1419 by Jetsun Kunkhen Lodroe Rinchen Senge. It was refurbished in the 18th century by Lhazang Khan. Devoted to tantric studies, the college had an assembly hall and two chapels in the ground floor. The Assembly hall was built with four tall and 42 short columns with elegantly carved capitals. The main image in the centre of the hall was of Jamchen Chojey (wearing a black hat), founder of the monastery. It was believed that the Yongle Emperor (1360–1424) presented this image to Sera. Other images enshrined in the hall were of Maitreya, Gyeltsen Zangpo (first religious teacher of Sera), Pawangka Rinpoche, Tsongkhapa (with his principle disciples), Dalai Lama XIII, Chokyi Gyeltsen and Lodro Rinchen (founder of Sera Je). The two chapels housed many statues; in the Neten Lhakhang chapel of Shakyamuni Buddha along with images of 16 elders in double series (Upper series made in Tibetan style and the lower series in Chinese lacquer given by the Chinese Emperor); and the Jigje Lakhang chapel housed the 15th century image of Bhairava along with those of Mahakala, Dharmaraja, Shridevi and many others. While the third story was the residence of the Dalai Lama, the second floor had the images Amitayus and also eight 'Medicine Buddhas', as also reliquaries (stupas) of Gyeltsen Zangpo and Jetsun Chokyi Gyeltsen. However, as per reports, this college was destroyed and all resident monks also died in the bombardment done by the Chinese in 1959.

=== Homdong Khangtsang ===
Homdong Khangtsang, also spelt ‘Kamcuns’ in Tibetan language, are the main dwelling units or dormitories which house the monks of the monastery; there are thirty-three Kamcuns surrounding the central courtyard. The size of the Kamcuns varied, depending on the strength of monks housed. Monks of the same village are housed together; however each monk is given a separate cell. Each Kamcun also has a prayer hall for exclusive study of Buddhist doctrine and also has annexed tea house. However, the main assembly hall here had minor images of Tsongkhapa, Choyi Gyeltsen, Shakhyamuni Buddha, Three Deities of Longevity, and two inner chapels – the Jampakhang with ‘speaking’ image of Tara (protector of the springs in Sera) and Lama Tubten Kunga (who renovated Sera Me) and Gonkhang chapel with the image of the protector deity Gyelchen Karma Trinle.

==== Choding Khang ====
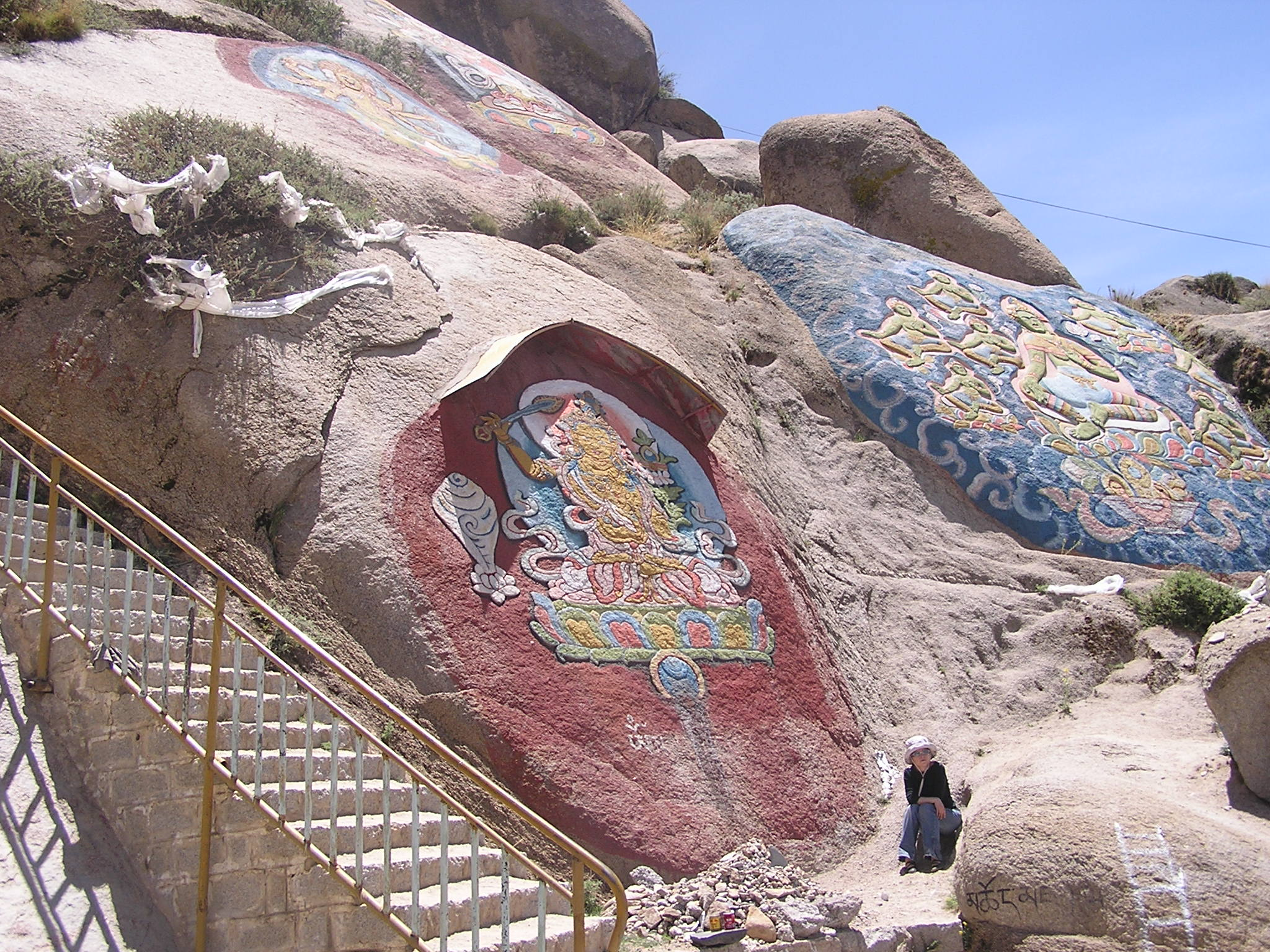
The Tsongkhapa and other deities painted on rock on the approach to hermitage

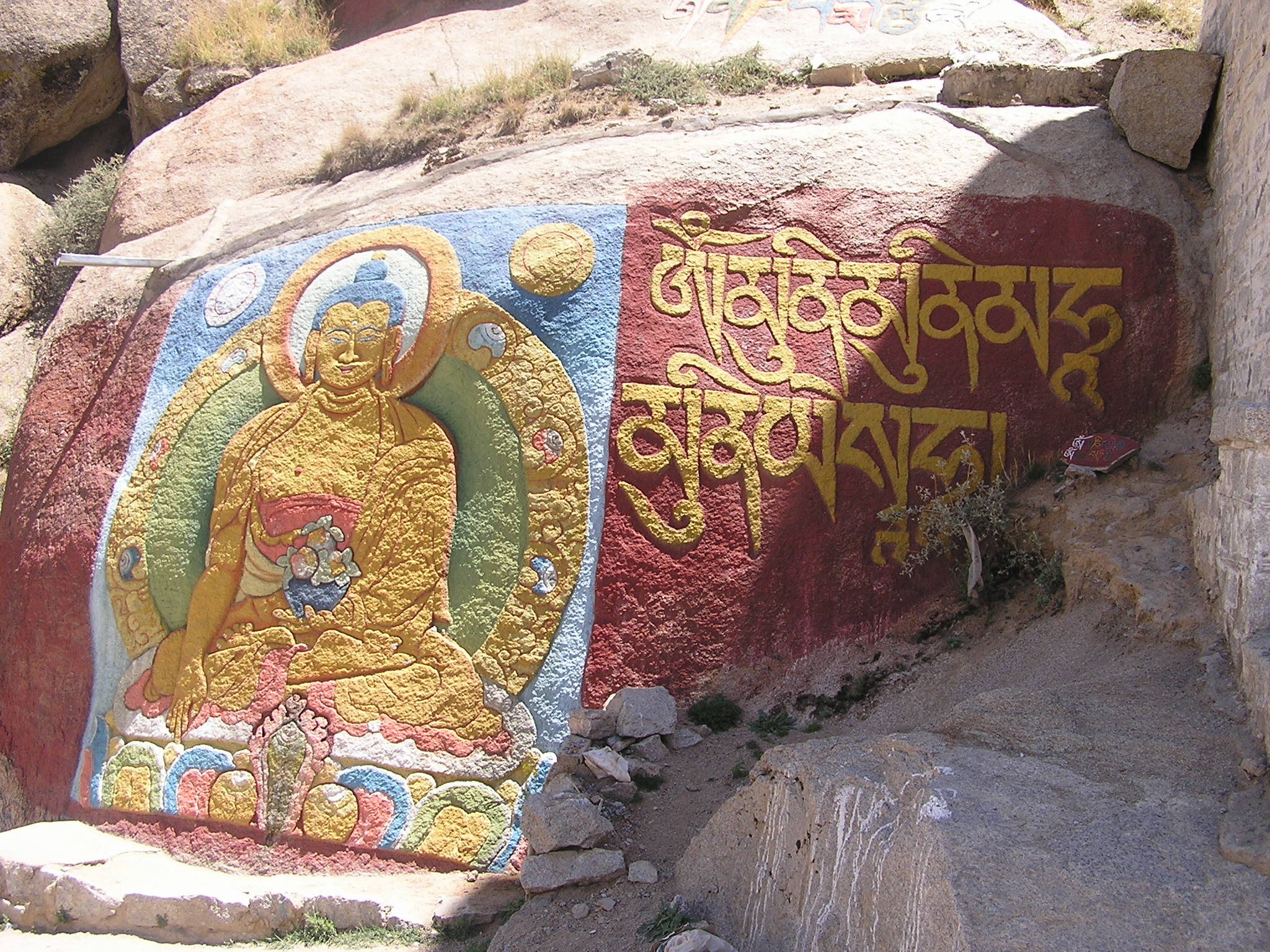
Image of Buddha

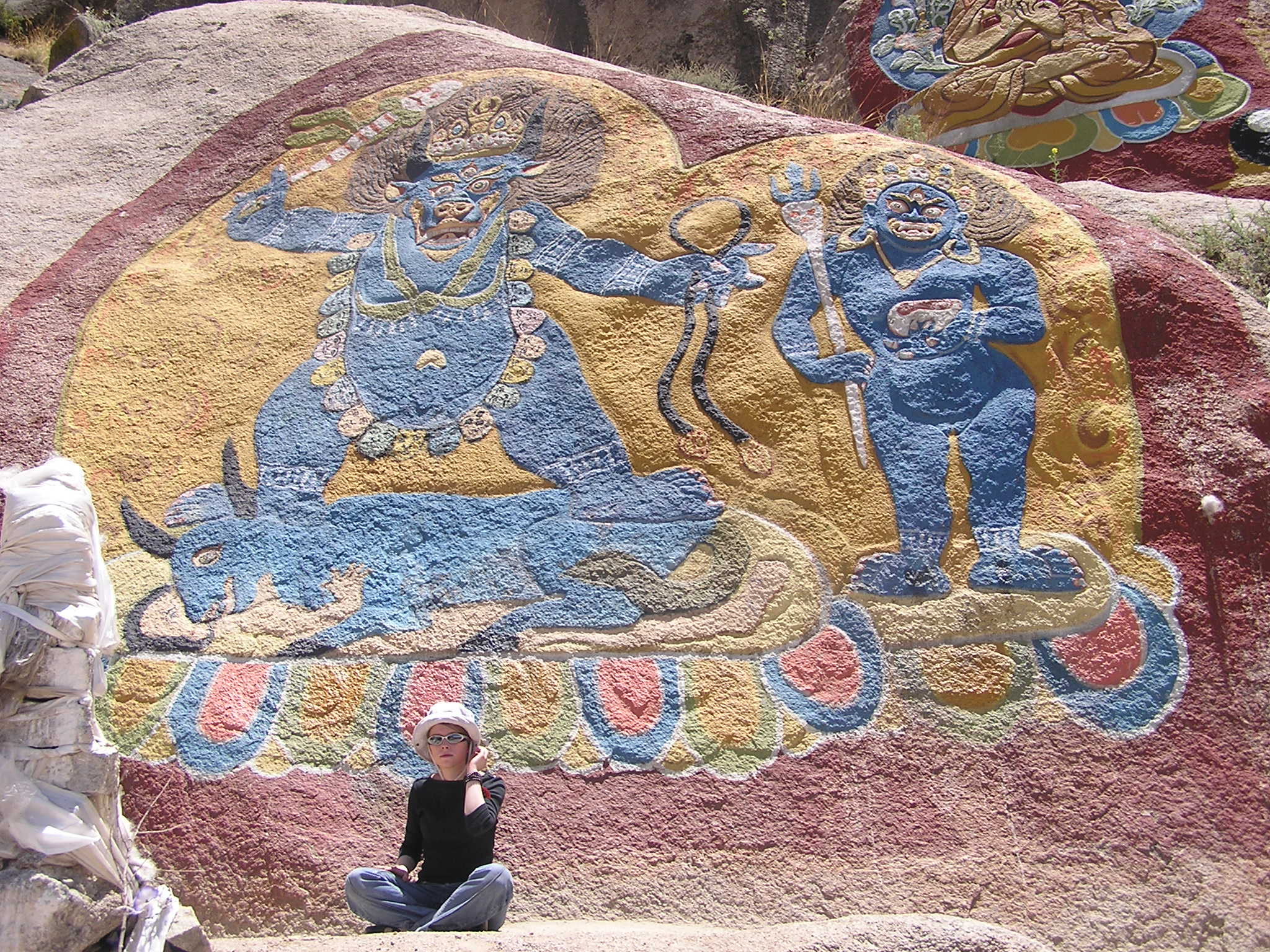
Images of frightful protector deities

Choding Khang is the hermitage located just behind the Great Assembly Hall (on the hill slope of Sera Utse). This is where Je Tsongkhapa meditated. The hermitage is accessed through a track where painted rock carvings of Tsongkhapa, Jamchen and Dharma Raja (the protector) are seen flanking the stepped approaches, along the route. A new building has been constructed in place of the old hermitage, which was destroyed during the Revolution. Below the hermitage are the Upper Tantric College (Gyuto) and Lower Tantric College (Gyu-me) of Lhasa). A further climb up the hill leads to caves where Tsongkhapa meditated.

== Hermitages and nunneries ==
Sera Monastery that developed over the centuries into a renowned place of learning, which trained hundreds of scholars who attained name and fame in the Buddhist nations, has under its affiliation 19 hermitages, including four nunneries, which are all located in the foothills above Lhasa. The nunneries established are the Chupzang Nunnery, the Garu Nunnery, the Negodong Nunnery and the Nenang Nunnery and a few nuns of some of these nunneries held protest marches against the Chinese rule, and as a result suffered incarceration and indignities. Brief details of the hermitages and nunneries are:

=== Hermitages ===
==== Pabongkha Hermitage ====
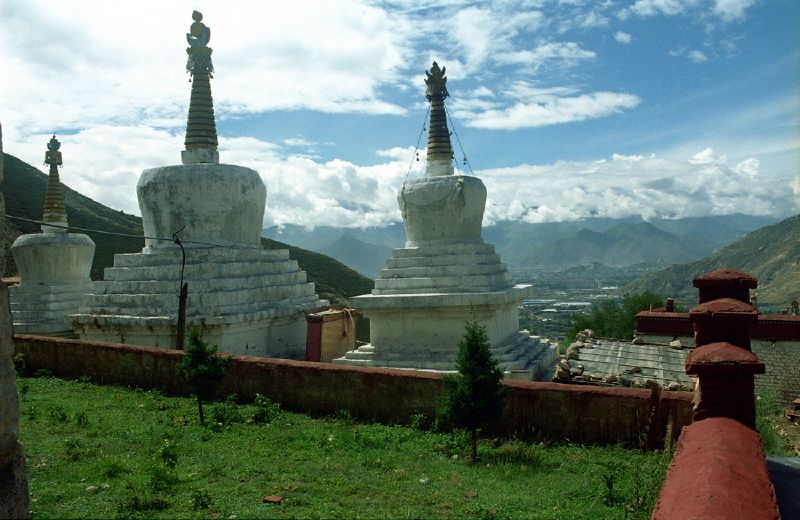
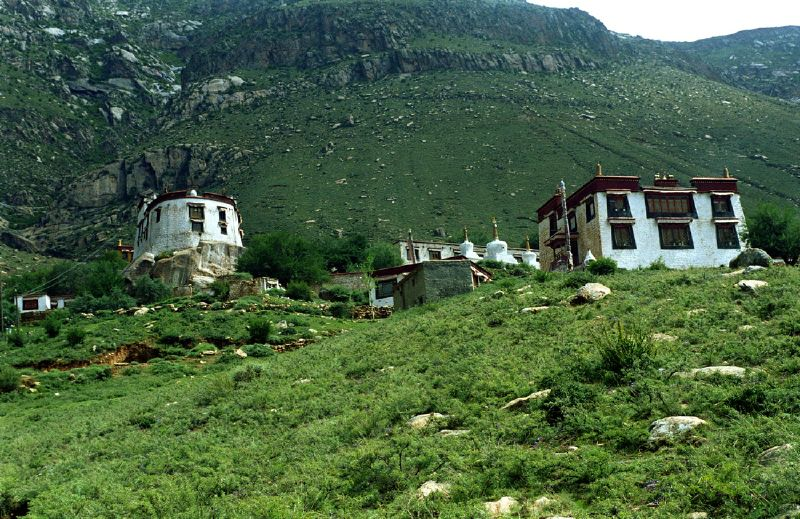
Pabonka Hermitage

Pabonka Hermitage (pha bong kha ri khrod), the largest and most important of the Sera hermitages is located about 8 km (5.0 mi) northwest of Lhasa in the Nyang bran Valley on the slopes of Mount Parasol.

The site, which is over 1,300 years old, dates back to Songtsän Gampo, the founder of the Tibetan Empire, and was amongst the first buildings built in the Lhasa area by him during the 7th century after settlement. Although originally the site of his castle or fort, the Tibetan Annals have revealed that Pabonka was converted into a monastery, possibly under the reign of the second great Buddhist king of Tibet Trisong Detsen. Detsen, along with Guru Rinpoche and the first seven monks of the new Tibetan Empire used to meditate at the hermitage and it became one of Tibet's very earliest Buddhist monasteries, possibly even pre-dating Jokhang. The original nine-storied monastery was partially destroyed by King Langdharma in 841 AD during his campaign to destroy monastic Buddhism; it was rebuilt in the 11th century as a two-storied structure that housed 200 monks.

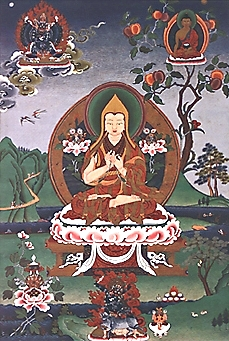
Je Tsongkhapa, who lived for some time as a hermit in Pabonka

Je Tsongkhapa (1357–1419) lived at the site as a hermit, and it eventually became a scholarly institution. The Fifth Dalai Lama was known to be fond of the monastery and funded the building of an upper floor for Pabonka.

Before 1959, Pabonka was independent of Sera Monastery, and from 1960 to the mid-1980s it was controlled by the Chinese. It then came under the control of Sera, whose monks renovated it and are continuing its traditions.

This temple is noted for its many shrines, and its blue and carved gold mantra in the hallway, inscribed with words meaning, "Hail to the jewel in the lotus". A number of stone relics were buried during the Cultural Revolution but when Sera monks restored the hermitage they excavated the relics and restored most of them. A central shrine, dating back 1300 years to Gampo, is located in the temple and depicts Chenresig, Jampelyang and Chana Dorje, the so-called "Rigsum Gompo Trinity" from which the temple takes its name. Up the hill from the hermitage, past a group of chortens, is Palden Lhamo Cave, a cave known to have been a meditation chamber of Songstan Gampo himself and contains statues of himself, his two wives and a rock carving of Palden Lhamo, the protectress.

The hermitage notably has its own tradition of monthly and yearly ritual cycles. The most important of these yearly ritual events (at least for the laity) are the six-day (three sets of two-day) Avalokiteśvara fasting rituals that take place during the Tibetan New Year (Losar) celebrations, the sixteen-day (eight sets of two-day) Avalokiteśvara fasting rituals that take place during the fourth Tibetan month (they attract many people from Lhasa and the surrounding districts), and a ritual and other events that take place during the “Sixth-Month Fourth-Day” pilgrimage.

==== Drakri Hermitage ====
Drakri Hermitage (brag ri ri khrod), also known as Bari Hermitage (sba ri ri khrod) lies about three kilometres north and slightly east of central Lhasa. Drakri, believed to have been founded by the abbot of Pha bong kh in the 18th century, was used as a meditational retreat by Klong rdol bla ma ngag dbang blo bzang (1719–1794), one of the most renowned scholars of the Lhopa Regional House (Lho pa khang tshan) of the Jé College (Grwa tshang byes). Drakri Hermitage had control over Garu Nunnery since its early history and supervised the training of the Garu nuns until 1959. In 1959, the monks of the hermitage were evicted and the hermitage was turned into the notorious Drapchi Prison, which gained a reputation for being one of the most severe penal institutions run by the Chinese in Tibet.

In the 1980s a citizen of Lhasa re-established the monastery under the Nyingma sect to remember his late mother. After receiving permission from the Lhasa municipal government, he began renovating the site, although a former official of the Bari Lama's estate who had previously controlled the monastery initially objected to it being converted into Nyingma practice centre.Today the hermitage, still partly ruined, consists of five major sections; a main temple compound around a central courtyard with a temple, kitchen, and some of the monks’ living quarters, an extensive ruined terraced complex just south of the main temple which before 1959 served as the meeting rooms and the living quarters of the workers and business managers of the Drakri Lama's estate, a building that had served as the living quarters for the eight fully ordained monks who formed the ritual core of the monastic community, a stable for mdzo, a yak-cow hybrid and several huts. The main temple contains statues of Guru Rinpoche and several tantric deities and a three-dimensional model of Guru Rinpoche's celestial palace, the Glorious Copper-Coloured Mountain (Zangs mdog dpal ri). Today there are four tantric priests residing in the main temple compound and two nuns living in huts to the southeast.

==== Jokpo Hermitage ====
The ruins of Jokpo Hermitage ('jog po ri khrod) is located in the far western end of the Nyang bran Valley. The former property of the Jokpo Lama's estate before the Chinese invasion in 1959, it originally served as the meditation retreat of a monk named 'Jog po rin po che of the Sera Mé College. The monk was a great meditator and according to tradition, after he died, his body remained in a state of perpetual meditative equipoise and was kept inside the Zhungpa Regional House temple where the monks reported that his hair and nails continued to grow even after his death. Before the Chinese invasion his body was buried and decayed and when the regional house (khang tshan) was rebuilt in the 1980s, his bones were exhumed. These are today placed inside the altar's clay statue in the regional house temple.

==== Keutsang Hermitage ====
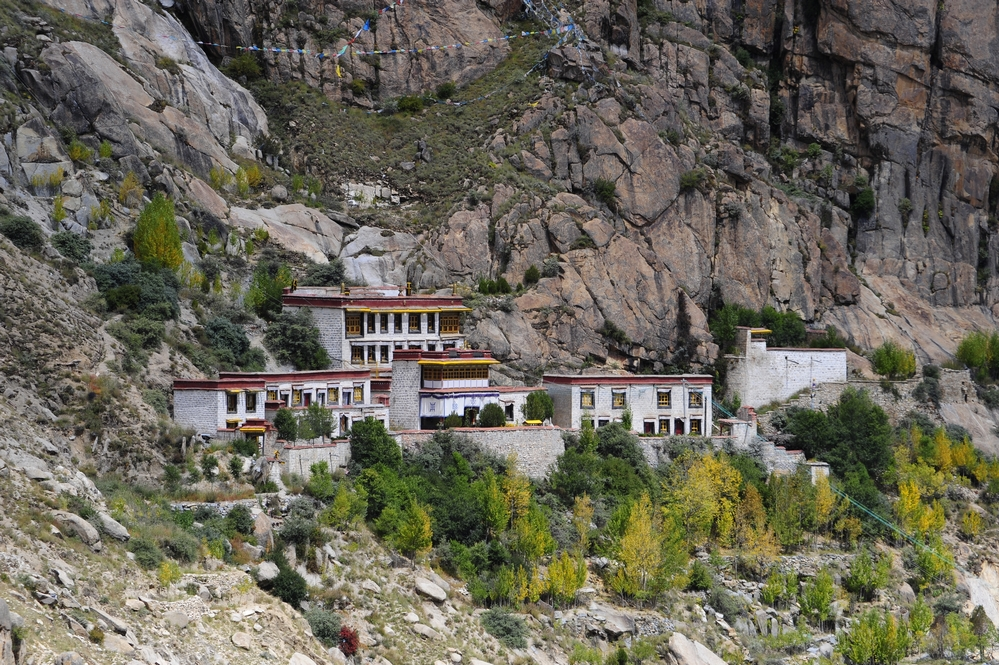
Keutsang Hermitage

Keutsang Hermitage (Ke'u tshang ri khrod) was a precariously perched cave hermitage inhabited by the great Tibetan guru Tsongkhapa. However, the original cave collapsed in a landslide. What is present now was rebuilt, adjoining the ruined Keutsang West Hermitage, at a safer location. As it exists now, Keutsang is located to the east of Sera on a hill side above Lhasa's principal cemetery. Rakhadrak Hermitage is located below this hermitage, within a close distance. This hermitage is also part of the Sera Mountain Circumambulation Circuit (se ra'i ri 'khor) that pilgrims undertake during the 'Sixth-Month Fourth-Day (drug pa tshe bzhi)' celebrations. The hermitage had smooth relationship with Sera all through its history so much so that every official monk of the hermitage enjoyed de facto status of a monk of the Hamdong Regional House (Har gdong khang tshan) of the Jé College also. The monastery also observes all ritualistic practices.

Some special aspects of the temple complex are: the belief that Maitreya (Byams pa) assures rebirth to those whose remains are brought to the cemetery below Keu tshang and it is also believed that light rays are exchanged between the Maitreya image here and the Maitreya Chapel at the northern end of the Barskor in Lhasa.

During the 1959 Cultural Revolution, the present and the fifth Keutsang incarnation (Keutshang sku phreng lnga pa) was incarcerated for a time and later he sought asylum in India in the 1980s.

The hermitage was destroyed during the Cultural Revolution. Rebuilding it was started by a former monk of the hermitage in 1991 and was completed by 1992. The rebuilt hermitage now houses 25 monks.

==== Keutsang East Hermitage ====
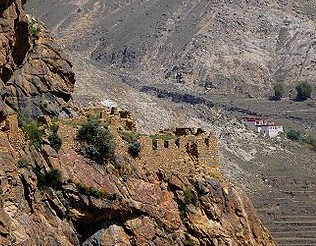
Ruins of 16 Arhats of Keutsang or Keutsang East Hermitage, destroyed after 1959

Keutsang East Hermitage (ke'u tshang shar ri khrod), a small hermitage exists now only in ruins between Keutsang West (Ke'u tshang nub), (now part of Kuetsang Hermitage) and the Purchok Hermitage. Its location is to the north of Lhasa. Prior to 1959, the hermitage belonged to Purchok Hermitage. It consisted of an assembly hall and monks' quarters and was famous for the divine image of Avalokiteśvara who blessed the dead at the funeral ground here. There were ten resident monks. However, at present there no plans to rebuild the hermitage due to lack of funds.

==== Keutsang West Hermitage ====
Keutsang West Hermitage is also in ruins and at present the Keutsang Hermitage has been built next to these ruins.

==== Khardo Hermitage ====
Khardo Hermitage (Mkhar rdo ri khrod) is a historical hermitage in the Dodé Valley, to the northeast of Lhasa and Sera monastery, which is named after the local deity (gnas bdag), known as Mkhar rdo srong btsan. Its setting is in a charnel ground ideal to perform tantric rites. The hermitage known as the "abode of saints" is surrounded by mountains on three sides which are all assigned divine names such as the ‘Soul Mountain of the Buddhas of the Five Families (Rgyal ba’i rigs lnga bla ri)' for a group of hills behind the monastery, 'Soul Mountain of Cakrasamvara (Bde mchog bla ri) where hand implements and bone ornaments of the deity were found, and the ‘Birth Deity Peak (Khrungs ba’i lha ri or ’Khrungs’ fro)' for the hill to the left of the hermitage. A cave here is known by the name the 'Offering Place Cave (Brag mchod sa)', (a copy of the holy Scriptures (Bka’gyur) is said to have been found here). Several local legends are narrated in respect of the history of founding the hermitage by Bzod pa rgya mtsho who lived in a cave here under the direction of the local deity. It was established in 1706. The hermitage, now in ruins, was originally built in three tiers (one above the other): the lowest tier was the hermitage or the main compound, the middle tier was known as the Upper Residence (Gzims khang gong ma) and top tier was the Temple of the Sixteen Arhats (Gnas bcu lha khang). The Seventh Dalai Lama, who was a student, fully supported Bzod pa rgya mtsho to build the first temple (Temple of the Sixteen Arhats) and also a residence for himself to stay during his visits to the hermitage, which came to be known as the 'Upper Residence'. The Dalai Lama's reverence for his guru was so deep that when the Bzod pa rgya mtsho died, he even performed the last rites for him, got installed his funerary stūpa and statue. He also located the Incarnate Lama of his guru at 'Phan po' near Lhasa. The second Bzod pa rgya mtsho also had excellent equation with the Eighth Dalai Lama, Jampel Gyatso (Da lai bla ma sku phreng brgyad pa ’jam dpal rgya mtsho). This power equation resulted in two more monasteries being built as satellite monasteries.

==== Panglung Hermitage ====
Panglung Hermitage (spangs lung ri khrod) is located in the valley, northeast and downhill from Phur lcog. Panglung lies completely in ruins although it once had a large temple and a Rdo rje shugs ldan oracle; an individual who would go into trance to make prognostications while possessed by the god. Panglung was attempted to be renovated in the 1990s, but met opposition from the local people because the site had always been associated with this controversial protector deity, so redevelopment was prevented.

==== Purbuchok Hermitage ====
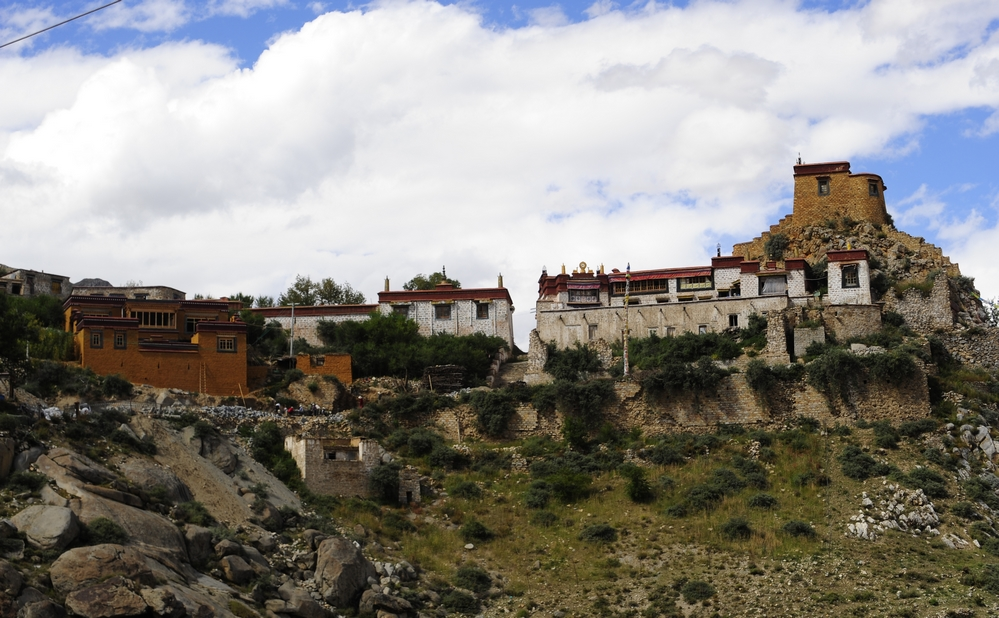
Purbuchok Hermitage

Purbuchok Hermitage (Phur bu lcog ri khrod) is situated in the Lhasa suburb of Dog bde in the northern mountains at the north-east corner of the Lhasa Valley. It is the last hermitage to be visited on the “Sixth-Month Fourth-Day” (drug pa tshe bzhi) pilgrimage circuit. Fairly fully rehabilitated, it is considered an attractive hermitage. The hills surrounding the monastery have been given name tags of the three protectors of the divine paradise namely the Avalokiteśvara, Mañjuśrī and Vajrapāni. It is also identified with the six syllables divine mantra (sngags)- "OM Mani Padme Hum".

History of the hermitage is traced to the 9th century when Padmasambhava (Padma ’byung gnas) meditated here. The main cave where he did penance is known as the ‘Cavern of Dochung Chongzhi (Rdo cung cong zhi’i phug pa)’. Over the centuries, the monastery has seen many leading lights of the Tibetan monastic order playing a role in its building, such as the Zhang ’gro ba’i mgon po g.yu brag pa (1123–1193), female saint Ma cig lab sgron, Sgrub khang dge legs rgya mtsho's (1641–1713), Ngawang Jampa (Phur lcog sku phreng dang po ngag dbang byams pa, 1682–1762) and Pan chen blo bzang ye shes (1663–1737). Royal family members like the Queen Tsering Trashi (Rgyal mo tshe ring bkra shis) and the Tibetan King Pho lha nas (1689–1747) also supported the activities of the hermitage. However, the most significant face of development occurred during the third Purchok incarnation Lozang Tsültrim Jampa Gyatso (Phur lcog sku phreng gsum pa blo bzang tshul khrims byams pa rgya mtsho) who was teacher of the 13th and 14th Dalai Lamas.

However, the Cultural Revolution of 1959 saw almost total destruction of the hermitage. Since 1984, with approval of the local government, a reconstruction face was begun and the hermitage has been substantially restored now to its past glory.

==== Rakhadrak Hermitage ====
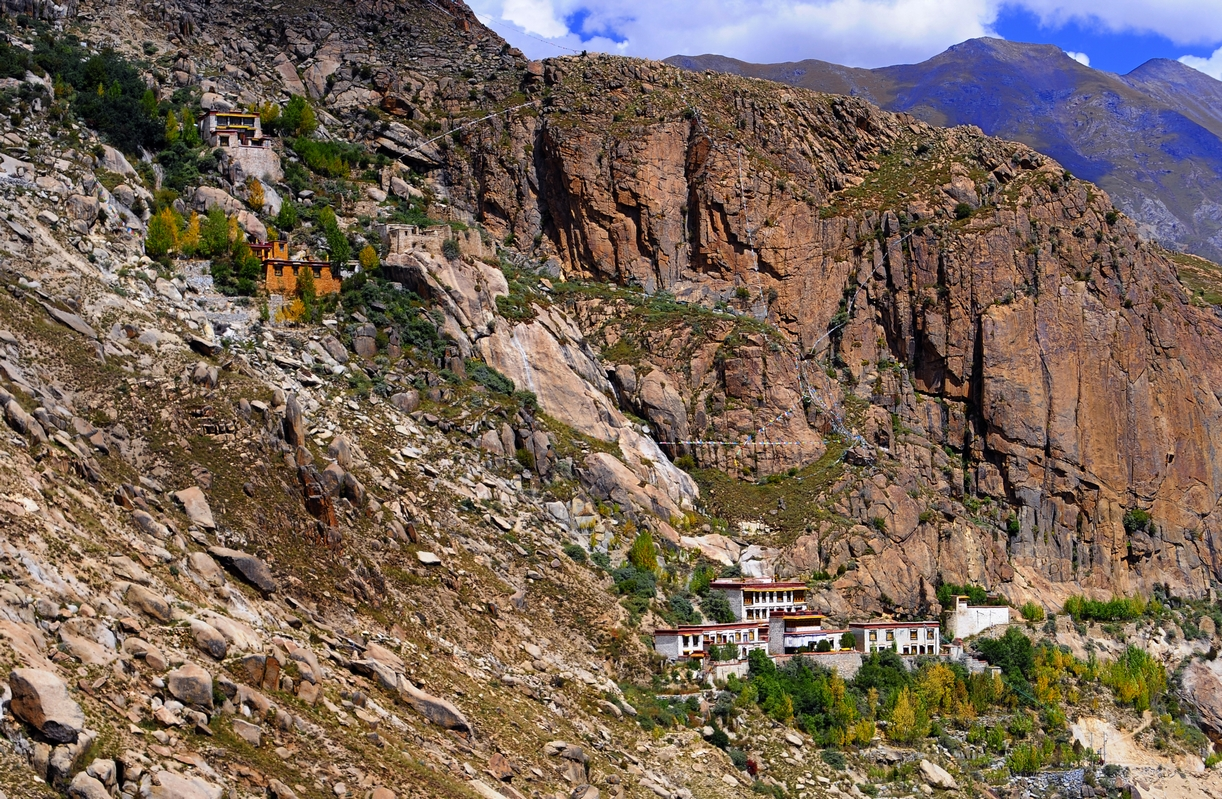
Rakhadrak Hermitage

Rakhadrak Hermitage (Ra kha brag ri khrod) is a historical hermitage, belonging to the Sera Monastery. It is located to the northeast of Sera and to the north of Lhasa. Mother of the Fifth Dalai Lama (Da lai bla ma sku phreng lnga pa) was the hermitage's benefactor. Under her patronage, the upper temple complex was built as a formal monastery. The hermitage was destroyed during the Cultural Revolution of 1959. In the 1980s, Sera took control of the hermitage complex. However, rebuilding activity has been sporadic and monastic rituals are not held.

==== Sera Chöding Hermitage ====
Sera Chöding Hermitage (Se ra chos sdings ri khrod) was a tantric college (rgyud smad grwa tshang) before the 1959 Cultural Revolution. Located close to Sera and facing south, it has a yellow retreat house which was built first for the Tsongkhapa. The interesting story of this house is that a local 'site-spirit' (gzhi bdag) used to visit Tsongkhapa through a narrow window in the house. Tsong kha pa's mural image is seen here on the wall, which is credited with special powers as an “image that speaks” or known as speaking-statue (gsung byon ma). It was Tsongkhapa's favourite hermitage where he spent substantial time and composed his magnum opus, the “Great Commentary on the Prajñāmūla (Rtsa shes Dīk chen). He also taught here. It is also known as the hermitage where Tsongkhapa assigned his Tantric teachings to Rje shes rab seng ge (1383–1445), the founder of the Tantric Colleges.

==== Sera Gönpasar Hermitage ====
Sera Gönpasar Hermitage (se ra dgon pa gsar ri khrod) is derived from the Tibetan name dgon pa gsar, meaning “new monastery.” Today it lies completely in ruins but the hermitage belonged to the bla mas of the Dgon pa gsar incarnation lineage and was established as a Dge lugs hermitage by the first Gönpasar incarnation, Ngawang Döndrup. The hermitage was run by thirteen fully ordained monks before its destruction in 1959. Some foundations and fragments of walls remain, including some notable rock carvings and a large stupa.

==== Sera Utsé Hermitage ====
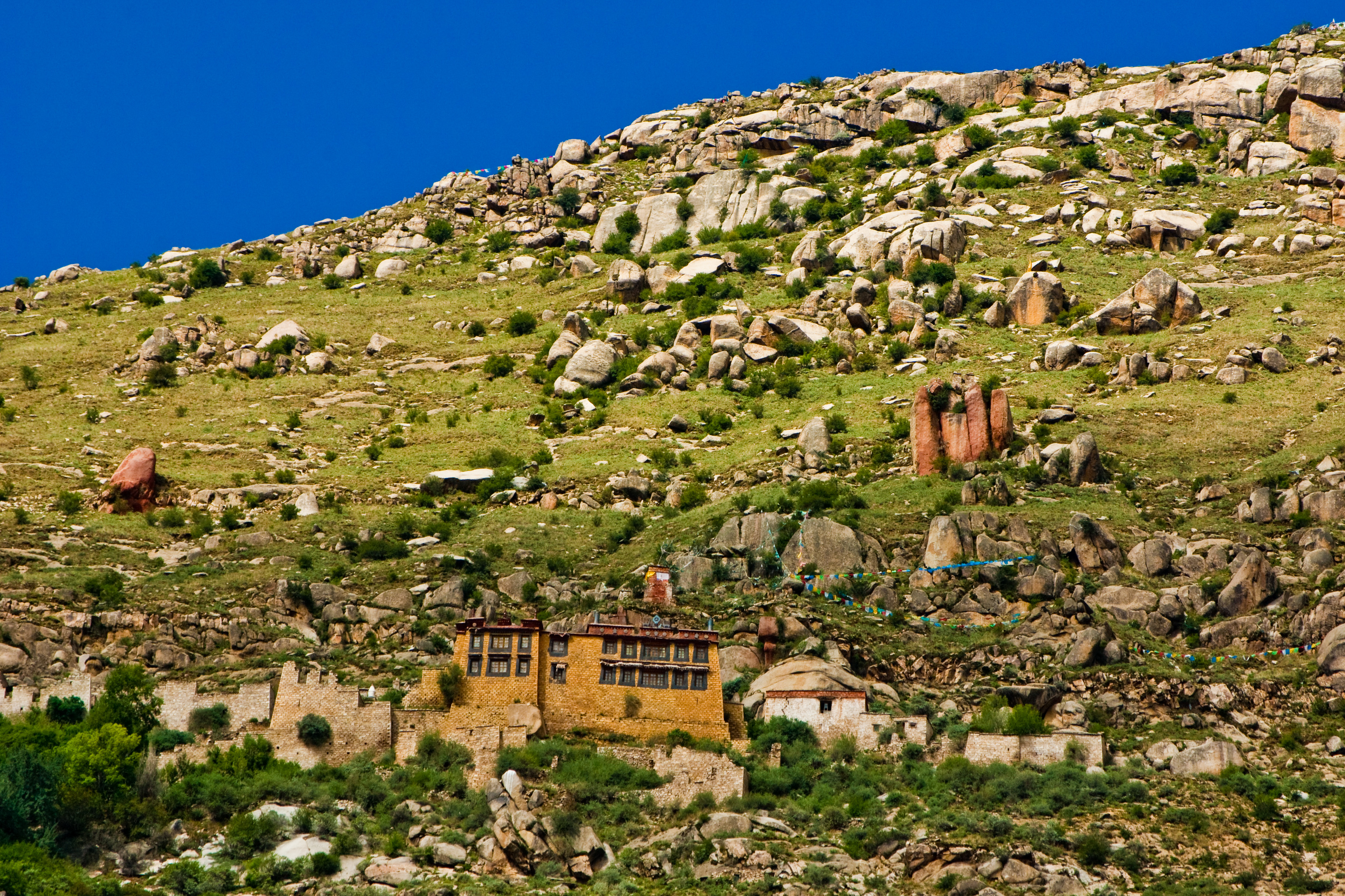
Sera Utsé Hermitage

Sera Utsé Hermitage (se ra dbu rtse ri khrod), meaning “Sera Peak” is located on the mountain directly behind Sera Monastery itself, which is about 5 km (3.1 mi) north of the Jokhang, about a 1 1/2-hour walk up the hill from the main complex of Sera. It is reputedly older than Sera Gompa. According to tradition, the site contained one of Tsongkhapa’s (1357–1419) meditation huts and Sgrub khang dge legs rgya mtsho (1641–1713) was reputed to have meditated here at end of the seventeenth or early eighteenth century. He was a distinguished meditator, who brought his knowledge of the philosophical tradition to Sera Utsé and attracted many students, amongst them included Phur lcog ngag dbang byams pa (1682–1762), and Mkhar rdo bzod pa rgya mtsho (1672–1749).

Historically the monastery was of substantial size but following its destruction by the Chinese in 1959 it was drastically reduced and only a section rebuilt. Sera Utsé has a two-storied chapel and monks' quarters with magnificent views over the city of Lhasa. There is a protector shrine to Pehar and Shridevi. A small assembly hall remains, which was once believed to contain a large metal statue of Vajrabhairava (Rdo rje ’jigs byed), a great statue of Yamāntaka Ekavīra, statues of the Buddha and the Sixteen Arhats, a speaking Tārā (Sgrol ma) statue, large images of Tsongkhapa and his two disciples, and statues of the bla mas of the Drupkhang incarnation (Sgrub khang sprul sku) lineage. Today the hall is inhabited by three monks but is not in use for central worship.

The bla ma’s residence which was inhabited by Sgrub khang bla also still exists and consists of two rooms with a central waiting room between them. There is also Sgrub khang pa's meditation hut, a small protector deity chapel, a Dharma enclosure (chos rwa), a ruined kitchen and various smaller huts, which are used mostly for storage today.

==== Takten Hermitage ====
Takten Hermitage (Rtags bstan ri khrod) is situated to the east of Trashi Chöling Hermitage and to the northeast of Sera. According to a legend, Dge-lugs bla-ma Pha bong kha bde chen snying po, on a visit to this area to find a retreat in the hills north of Sera, had a vision of a crow which spoke to him. He interpreted it as a “revealed sign” to build his hermitage here. The hermitage mostly consists of caves with fascia at the entrance to the caves. It belongs to the Pabongkha Lama's estate (Pha bong kha bla brang). Dge-lugs nuns, who have carried out restoration works at the hermitage, now live here.

==== Trashi Chöling Hermitage ====
Trashi Chöling Hermitage (Bkra shis chos gling ri khrod), which means “The Place of Auspicious Dharma” is located 3 km (1.9 mi) from Sera on the hills to the north-west of Sera. The hermitage, which is south facing, is part of the pilgrimage of the "Sera Mountain Circumambulation Circuit (se ra ri ’khor)". The hermitage that was substantially destroyed during the Cultural Revolution was rebuilt during the 1990s. The hermitage is now a part of the Pabongkha Lama's estate, the present incarnation, (after his recent return to Tibet) and is stated to be functioning as an autonomous institution with minimum allegiance to Sera.

=== Nunneries ===
==== Chupzang Nunnery ====
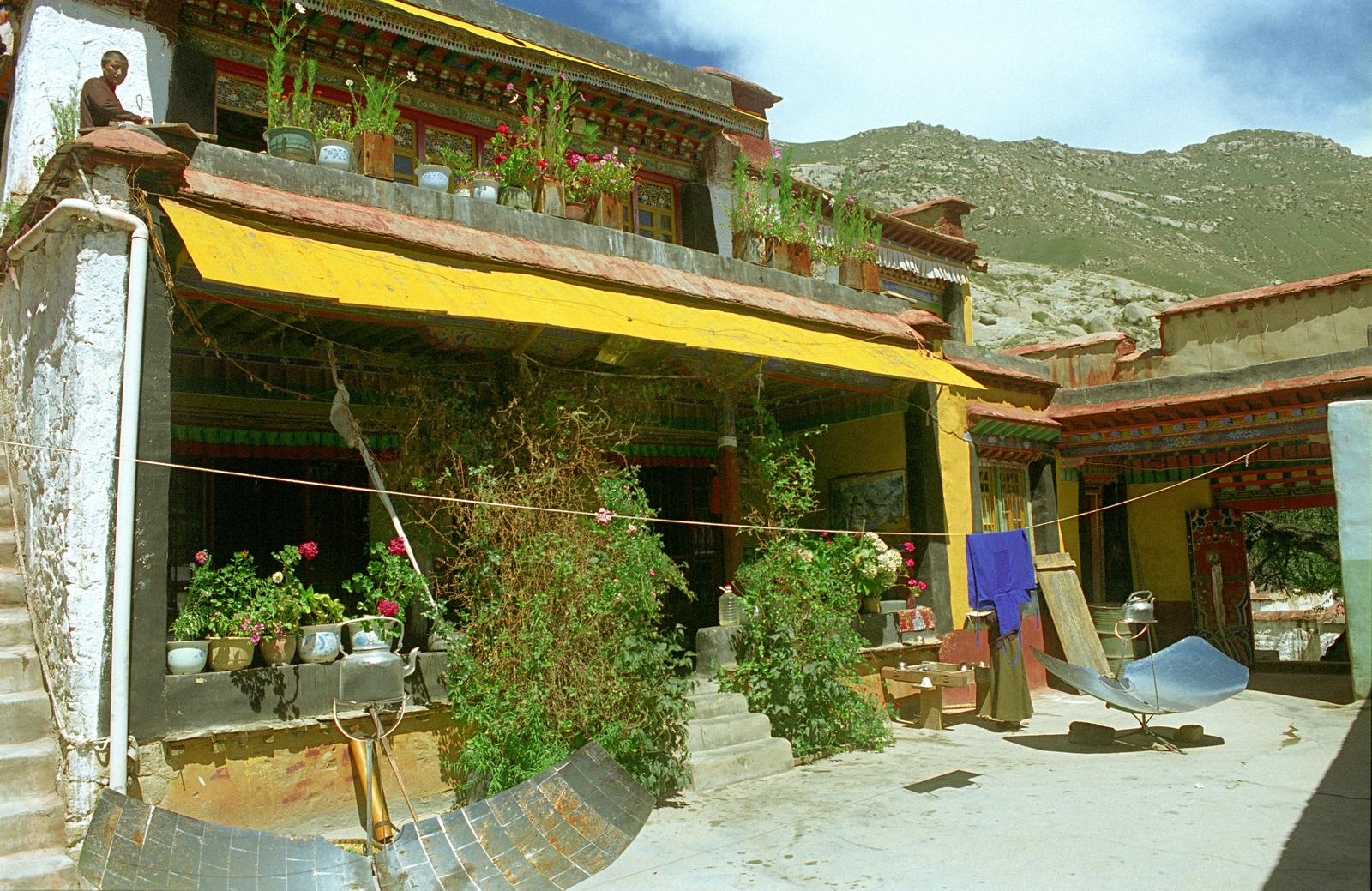
Chubzang Nunnery

The hermitage is believed to have been founded by Phrin las rgya mtsho (d. 1667), who was the regent of Tibet from 1665 to his death. He was a student of the Fifth Dalai Lama and requested his permission to build a hermitage for eight to sixteen monks in the foothills above his native Nyangbran and invited the Fifth Dalai Lama to perform a “site investigation” (sa brtag) to determine the most auspicious location on which to build the monastery. The Dalai Lama made the treasure (gter) discovery of the self-arisen stone image of the Buddha that is still located in Chupzang's lower temple. However, the initial hermitage fell into ruin and the official founding of the monastery is credited to Phrin las rgya mtsho's nephew, Sde srid sangs rgyas rgya mtsho, in around 1696.

The hermitage belonged to Chubzang ye shes rgya mtsho for sometime who built a four-pillar temple with rear chapel and porticos at the site. It was later under the possession of Byang chub chos ’phel (1756–1838) and Khri byang sku phreng gsum pa blo bzang yeshes, who was a junior tutor to the living 14th Dalai Lama.

In 1921, Pha bong kha bde chen snying po (1878–1941) stayed at Chubzang and published his teachings through his most famous work, Liberation in Our Hands (Rnam grol lagbcangs).

In the 1950s, the site began to be used as a religious retirement community by elderly Lhasans, who constructed small huts in which they could live out the final years of their lives in intensive Buddhist practice. Nuns began to renovate the site in the 1980s and founded the modern nunnery, as it is seen today, in 1984, and has since grown into one of the largest nunneries in the Lhasa Valley. However, somewhat unusually, the houses are owned individually by the nuns, but the nunnery has an administrative body and a site for communal gathering.

==== Gari Nunnery ====
Gari Nunnery is located north of Lhasa. The nunnery has an ancient history traced to the 11th century when Pha dam pa sangs rgyas), the Buddhist preceptor, visited this location. He not only named the place as "Garu" but also ordained that it shall be a "Nunnery" not a monastery of monks, on the basis of prophetic events that occurred during his visit to the place. The Nunnery's fame in recent years is the leading and bold role that some of the nuns have played in organizing silent demonstrations against the Chinese rule, and seeking freedom of Tibet. Many of the protesting nuns were arrested, incarcerated, brutally handled and released only after protracted detention.

==== Negodong Nunnery ====
Negodong Nunnery, a historical hermitage, is located in the Lhasa suburb of Dog bde, northeast of Sera (and also of Lhasa). It is believed that it was originally a retreat of the Buddhist scholar of the Sera Jé College's (Grwa tshang byes) Gomdé Regional House (Sgom sde khang tshan), Nam mkha’ rgyal mtshan. It was initially founded as a monastery with seventeen monks but later allotted in 1930 for exclusive use as a nunnery to provide personal security to the nuns who were then residing in a remote nunnery at Gnas nang (in a remote higher valley to the east) away from the present location at Nedong Nunnery Gnas sgo gdong (about a one-hour walk). The monks were shifted to Gnas nang(the original home of the nuns).

==== Nenang Nunnery ====
Nenang Nunnery (Gnas nang dgon pa) is located to the east of Negodong Nunnery (Gnas sgo gdong dgon pa) in Lhasa prefecture. It is associated with Padmasambhava who is stated to have meditated in two nearby caves in the 9th century. Founding the hermitage as a nunnery is credited to a nun (interpreted as a Dakini) by name Jetsün (or Khachö) Dröldor Wangmo (Rje btsun nam mkha’ spyod sgrol rdor dbang mo). It functioned well as nunnery during her time and also during the next generation but went into decline thereafter. It was then brought under the jurisdiction of the Khardo Hermitage.

== Debates ==
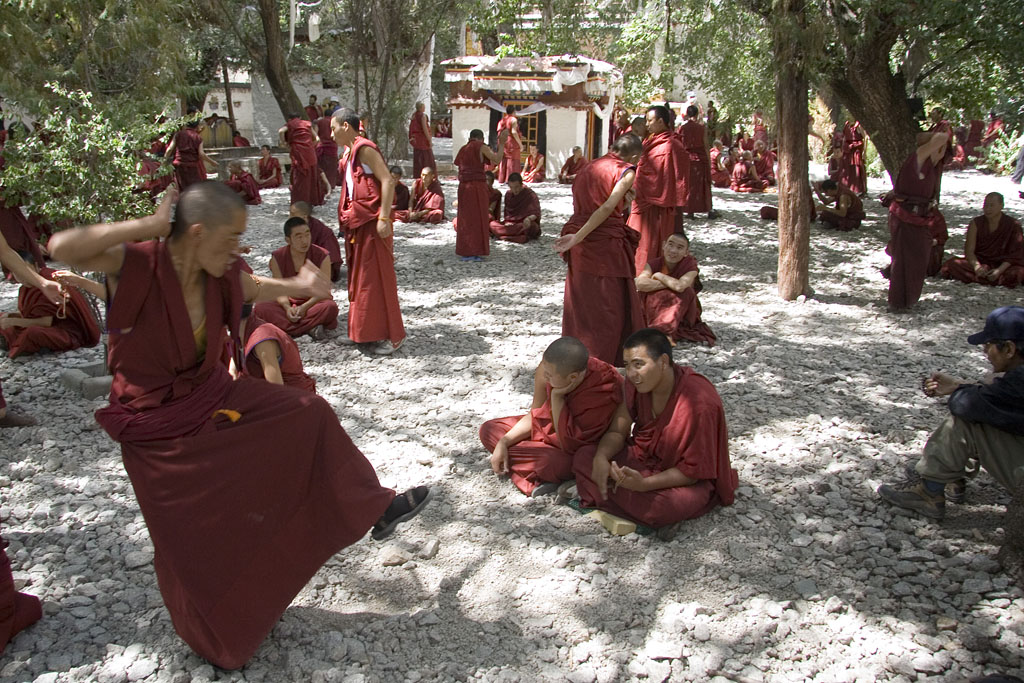
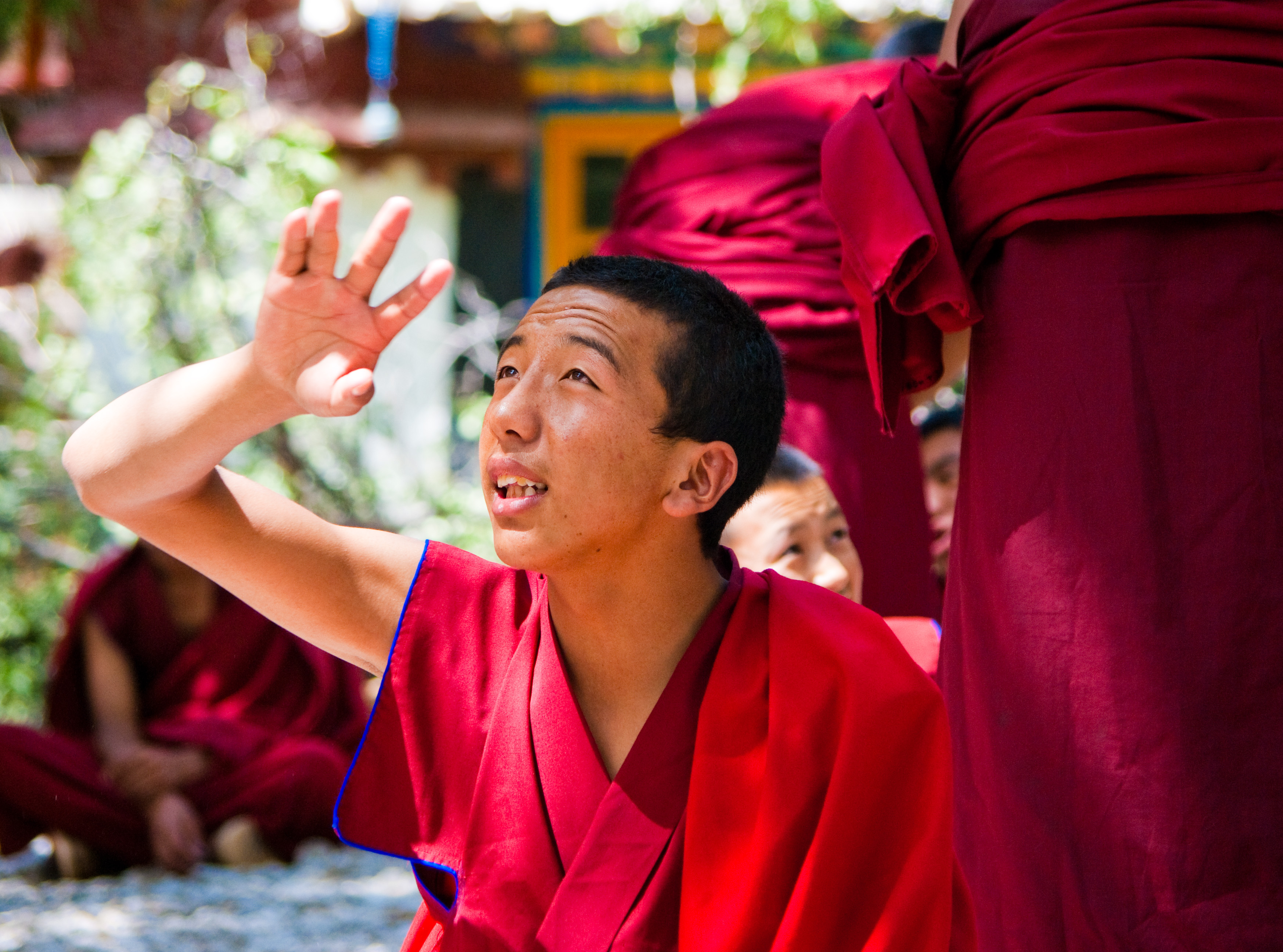
Debating monks and gesturing.

Debates among monks on the Buddhist doctrines are considered integral to the learning process in the colleges in the Sera Monastery complex. This is meant to facilitate better comprehension of the Buddhist philosophy to attain higher levels of study. This debating tradition supplemented with gestures is said to be exclusive to this monastery, among the several other monasteries of Lhasa. Visitors also attend to witness these debates that are held as per a set schedule, every day in the 'Debating Courtyard' of the monastery.

=== Procedures and rules ===
Monks debating at Sera monastery, Tibet, 2013

The debate among monks unfolds in the presence of their teachers, with a very well set rules of procedure for the defender and the questioners. The tradition of such debates is traced to the ancient ‘Hindu Orthodoxy’ in India and this practice permeated into Buddhist orthodoxy in Tibet in the eighth century. Such debates usually take place within the monastery's precincts. The defender has the onus to prove his point of view on the subject proposed for debate. The debate opens with an invocation to Manjushri recited in a loud and high pitched tone. The roles of the debater and the questioner are well defined; the questioner has to succinctly present his case (all on Buddhism related topics) and the defender has to answer within a fixed time frame. The finality of the debate is with specific answers like: “I accept (do), the reason is not established (ta madrup) or there is no pervasion (Kyappa majung)”. Many a time, the questions mooted are meant to mislead the defender. If the defender does not reply within a time frame, an expression of derision is witnessed. In the Tibetan debating sessions, there is no role for a witness and there is normally no adjudicator. This leads to “conflicting opinions of participants and listeners.” When there is direct contradiction on the defenders part, the outcome is, however, formally decided.

=== Physical gestures ===
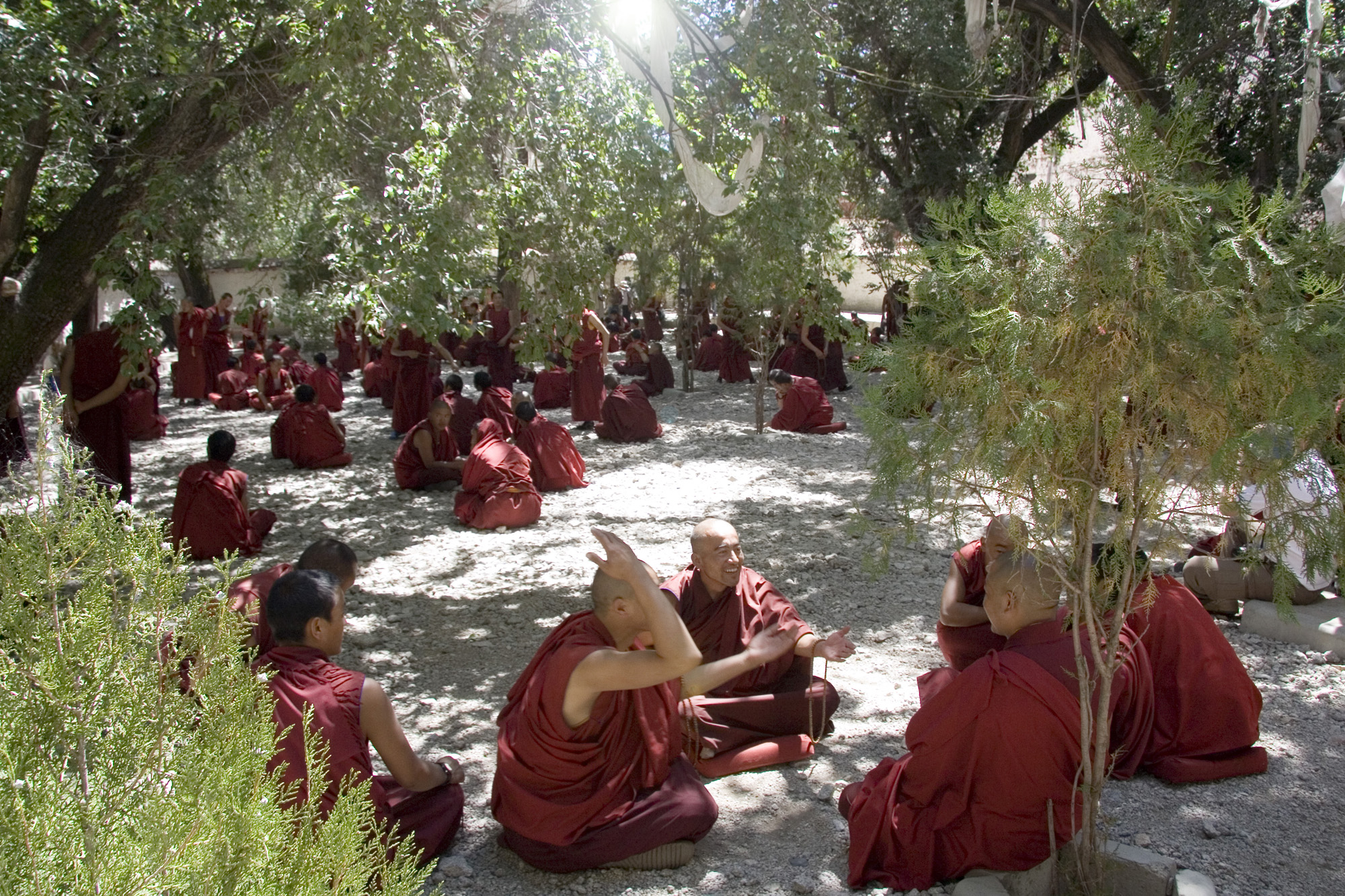
Monks practicing their debating skills following afternoon meditation, Sera Monastery

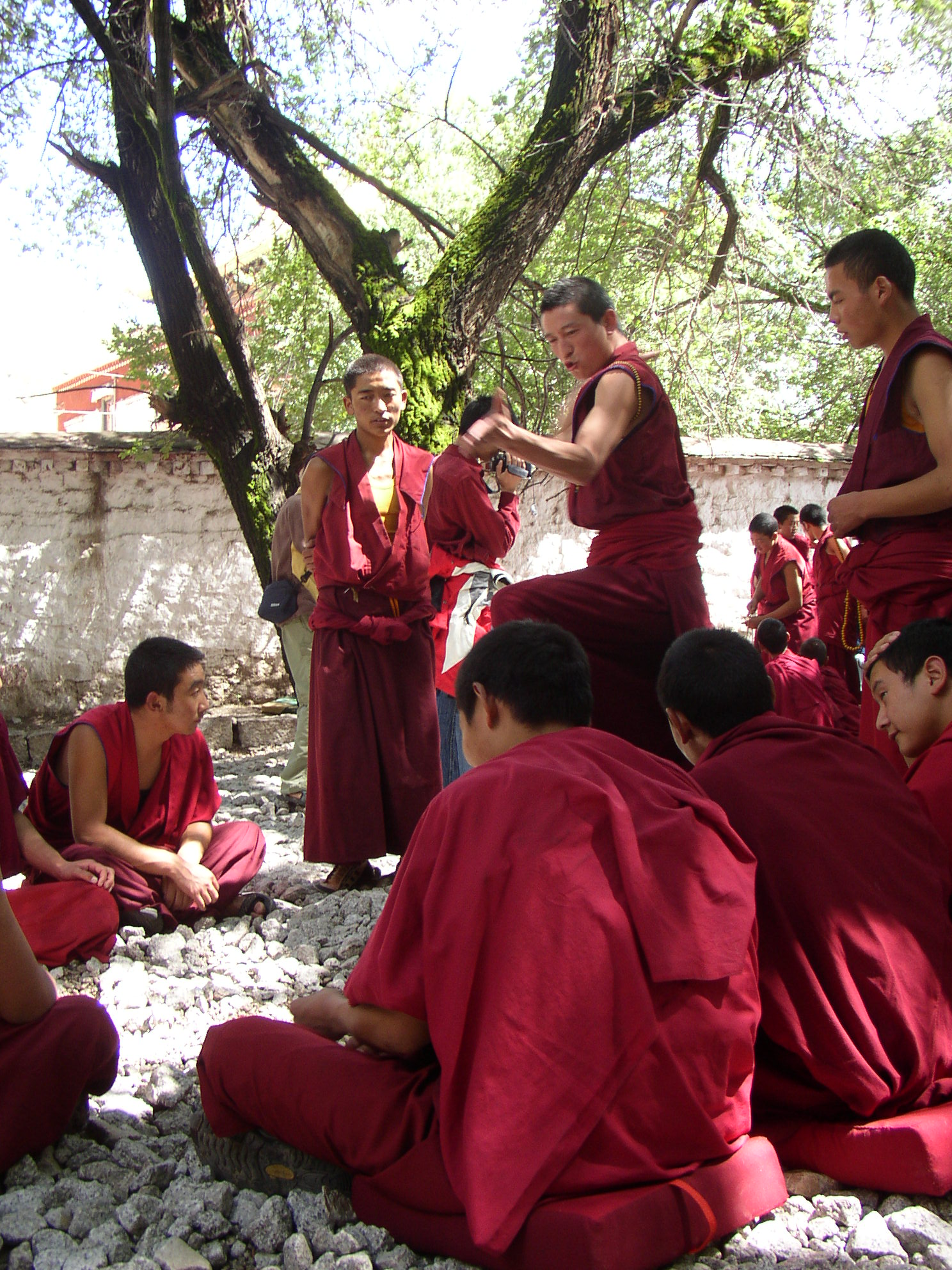
Debating monks at Sera Monastery

Debates are punctuated with vigorous gestures which enliven the ambience of the occasion. Each gesture has a meaning. The debater presents his case with subtlety, robed in a formal monk's attire. Some of the gestures (said to have symbolic value), made during the debates, generally subtle dramatic gestures are: clapping after each question; holding right hand and stretching left hand forward and striking the left palm with the right palm; clapping hands loudly to stress the power and decisiveness of the defender's arguments denoting his self-assurance; in case of wrong answer presented by the defender, the opponent gestures three circles with his hand around the defenders head followed by loud screaming to unnerve the defender; opponent's mistake is demonstrated by wrapping his upper robe around his waist; loud clapping and intense verbal exchange is common; and the approach is to trap the defender into a wrong line of argument. Each time a new question is asked, the teacher strikes his outstretched left palm with his right palm. When a question is answered correctly, it is acknowledged by the teacher bringing the back of his right hand to his left palm. When the defender wins the debate he makes an allegorical dig at the questioner by questioning his basic wisdom as a Buddhist.

=== Schedule ===
The tradition of conducting debates in the Gelukpa tradition was set in many monasteries of the Gelukpa sect, including the Ganden Monastery, the Sera Monastery, and the Drepung Monastery, not only in pre-modern Tibet but also in other similar monasteries established in exile, such as in Sera, India. At each location in Tibet, the debates are held under eight debating schedules in a year, depending on the rituals and festivals observed during the whole year. Each daily session is held between eight breaks when students debate on issues of Buddhist scriptures and related subjects. In the Sera monastery, the debate alternated by rituals has a daily schedule (with alterations to suit the climatic season) of the Morning debate (07:00 to 10:00), Noon debate (11:00 to 13:00), Afternoon debate (14:00 to 16:00) and Night debate (08:30 to 09:30).

== Festivals ==
The monastery hosts an impressive festival, popularly known as the 'Sera Bengqin Festival', which is largely attended by monks and devotees. The festival is held some time in February as per the Gregorian calendar corresponding to specific date fixed by the monastery according to the Tibetan calendar. On the festival day, a Dorje Pestle is ceremoniously taken to the Potala Palace. The Dalai Lama offers prayers to the Buddha to bestow strength and blesses the Pestle. Thereafter, the pestle is briefly placed on the heads of the monks and disciples by the Khenpo (president) of the Ngaba Zhacang.

Another popular festival witnessed by visitors and locals is the Sho Dun Festival held in the month of August in the Gregorian calendar. The festival represents the symbolic Buddha-Unfolding, where worship of the Buddha is the essential part.

== Notable alumni ==
Graduates of Sera Jey and Mey College who are known in the West include:

- Geshe Ngawang Tsondu, Wisdom of The Staten Island, Dharma Centre, The Meditation Factory, and Tibet House, New York City.
- Geshe Lhundub Sopa, professor emeritus at the University of Wisconsin, Madison.
- Geshe Rabten, an eminent monk who directed Tharpa Chloing Buddhist Center in Mont Pelerin, Switzerland.
- Kyabje Choden Rinpoche, Sera Jey's debate representative for the occasion of the 14th Dalai Lama's Geshe examinations; renowned scholar and yogi who spent 19 years in solitary dark retreat.
- Lama Thubten Yeshe, founder of the Foundation for the Preservation of the Mahayana Tradition (FPMT).
- Lama Thubten Zopa Rinpoche, a student of Lama Yeshe and presently director of FPMT.
- Pabongkhapa Déchen Nyingpo — Author of Liberation in the Palm of Your Hands - a highly revered Lama who lived in the late nineteenth and early twentieth century and was the Spiritual Guide of Trijang Rinpoche, the 14th Dalai Lama's own Spiritual Guide.
- Sermey Khensur Rinpoche Geshe Lobsang Tharchin—former abbot of Sera Mey university in Bylakuppe.
- Geshe Tenzin Zopa, attendant of Geshe Lama Konchog, and the subject of the 2008 documentary film Unmistaken Child.
- Kyabje Khensur Kangurwa Lobsang Thubten Rinpoche, 69th Abbot, Founder of the Tibetan Sponsorship Scheme and Tibetan Buddhist Institute

== Recent Events ==
Sera, Tibet that housed more than 5,000 monks in 1959, though badly damaged during the 1959 uprising, is still functional after restoration.

In 2011, according to local sources, there are about 300 monks. The reason for this decline is attributed to the 2008 Tibetan unrest.

== Gallery ==
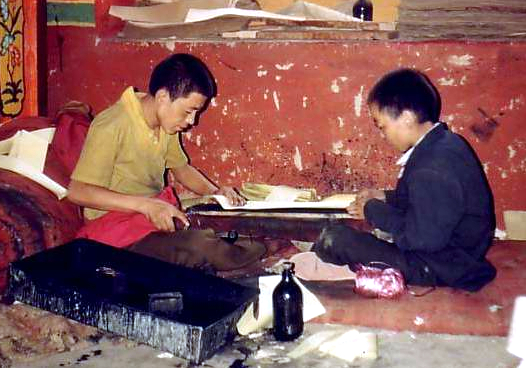
Young monks printing scriptures. Sera Monastery, 1993

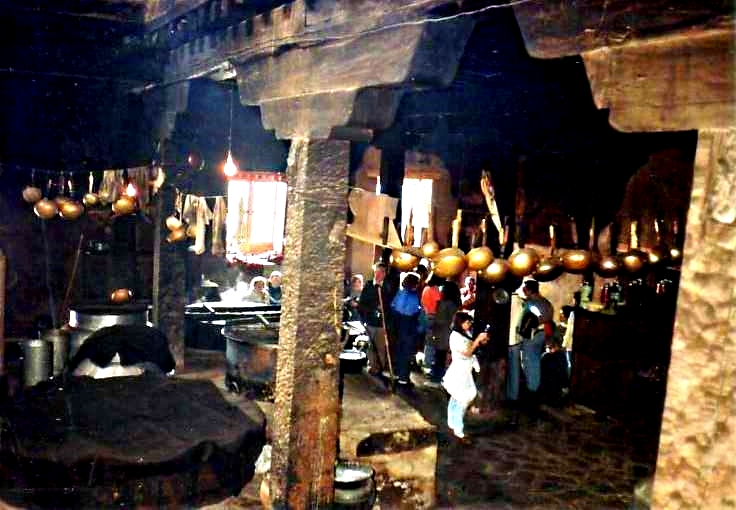
Kitchen at Sera Monastery, 1993

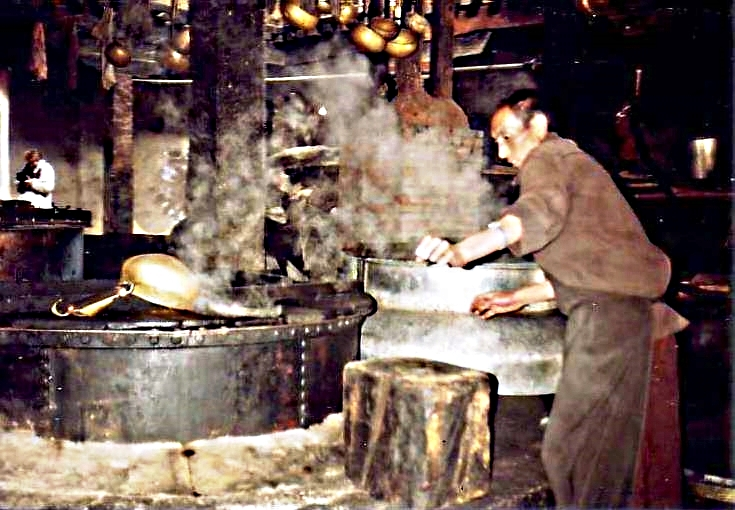
Cooking at Sera Monastery, Lhasa. 1993

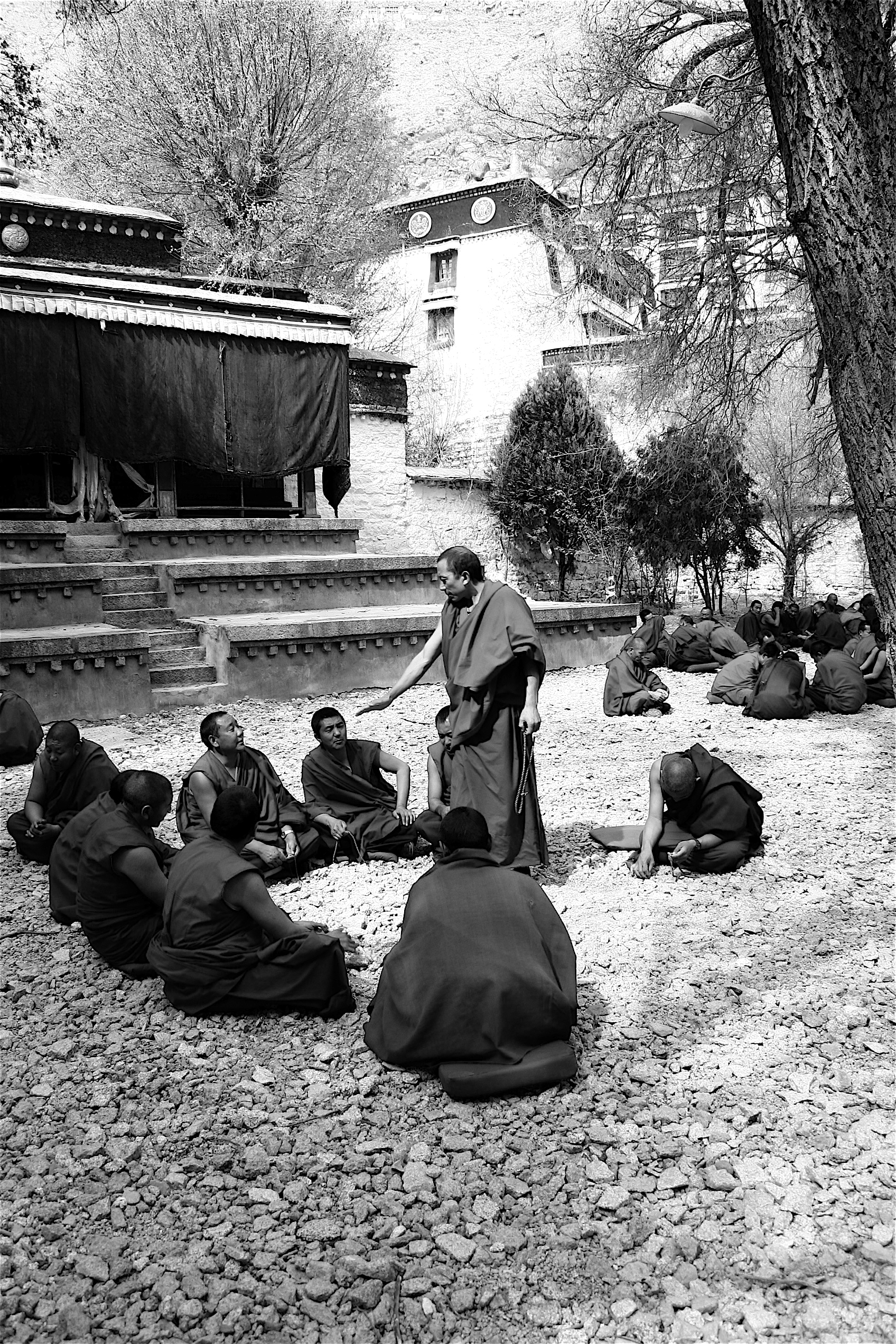
Monks in an intense debating session

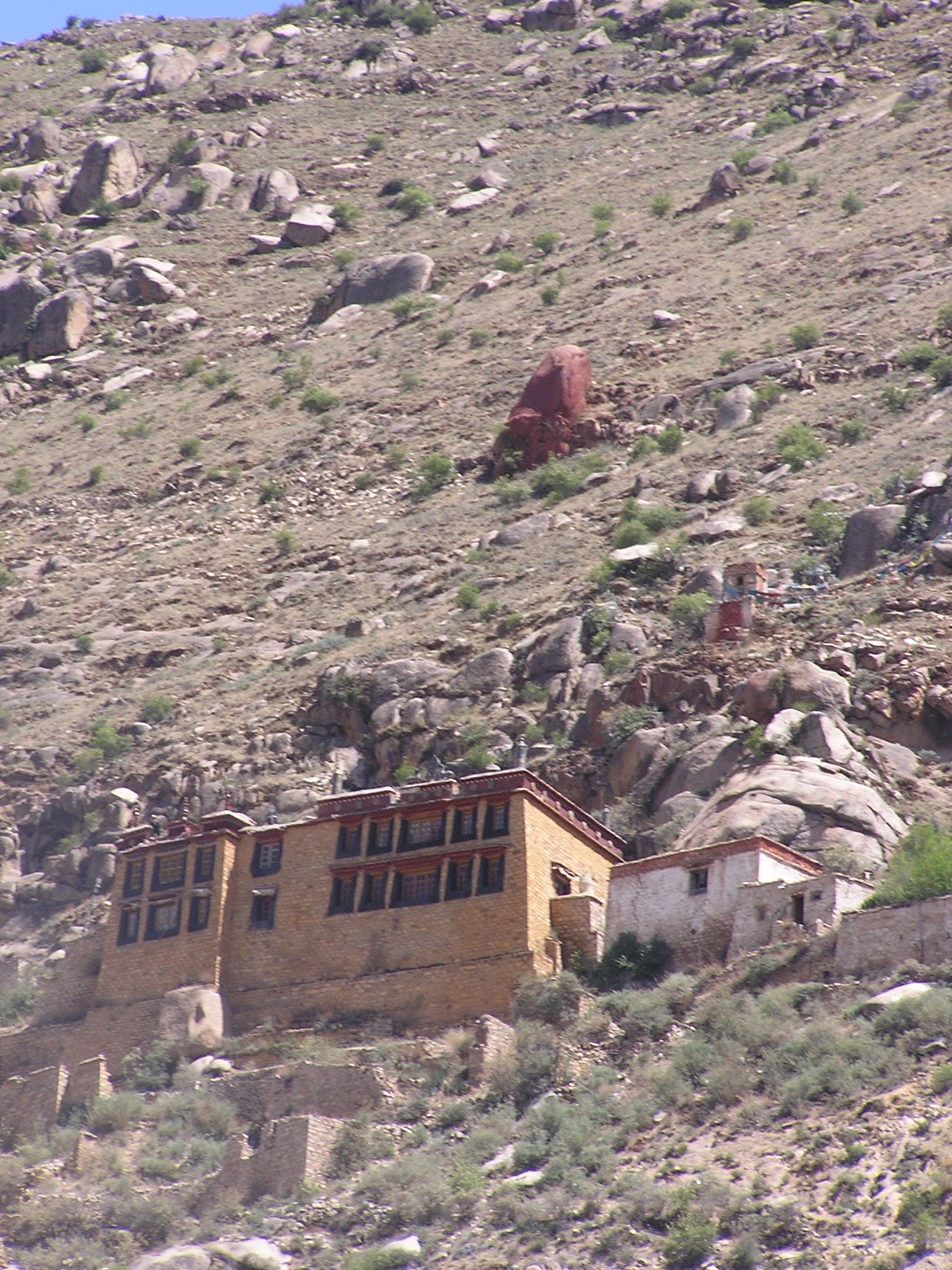
Sera Utsé Hermitage

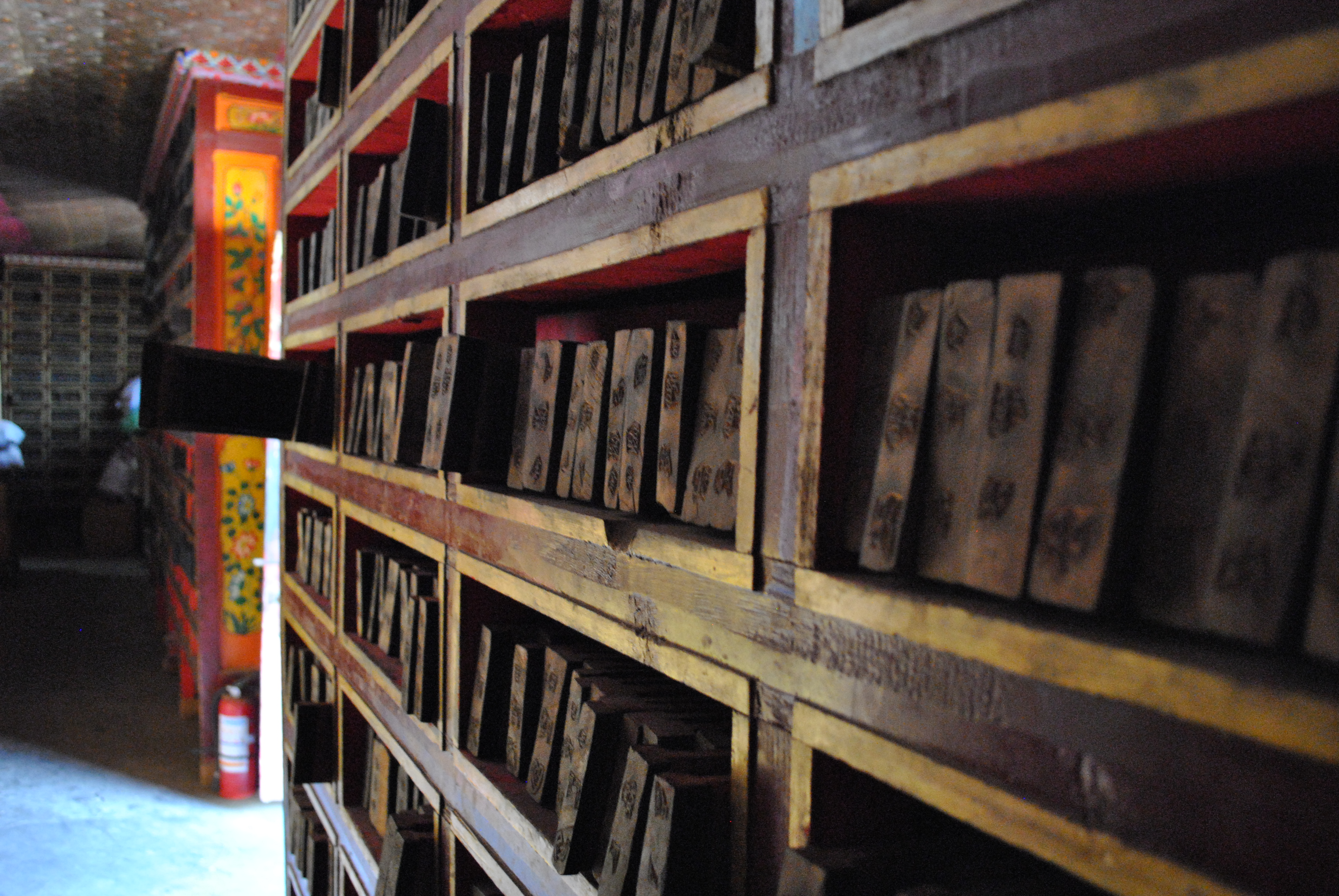
Woodblocks for printing, Sera monastery in Tibet, 2013

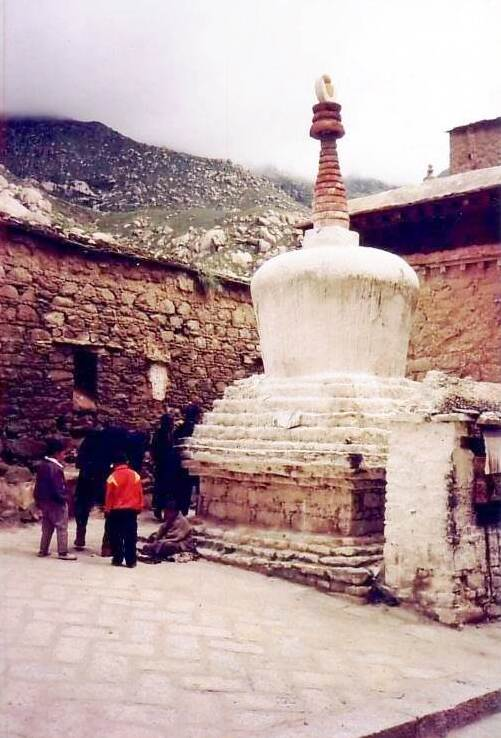
Old Chorten at Sera, 1993

== See also ==
- Tibetan Buddhist Institute
