= Panglung Hermitage =

Religion
- Affiliation: Tibetan Buddhism

Location
- Location: Lhasa Prefecture, Tibet, China
- Country: China

Panglung Hermitage is a historical hermitage, belonging to Sera Monastery. It is located north of Lhasa.

== Footnotes ==
The Tibetan and Himalayan Library
