= Sera Gönpasar Hermitage =

- Location within Tibet

Religion
- Affiliation: Tibetan Buddhism

Location
- Location: Lhasa Prefecture, Tibet, China
- Country: China
- Interactive map of Sera Gönpasar Hermitage
- Coordinates: 29.68579°N 91.08616°E

Sera Gönpasar Hermitage is a historical hermitage, belonging to Sera Monastery. It is located north of Lhasa in Tibet.

== Footnotes ==
The Tibetan and Himalayan Library
