= Takten Hermitage =

Buddhist hermitage in Lhasa, Tibet, China

Religion
- Affiliation: Tibetan Buddhism

Location
- Location: Lhasa Prefecture, Tibet, China
- Country: China

Takten Hermitage is a historical hermitage, belonging to Sera Monastery. It is located in the north of Lhasa in Tibet.

== History ==
Dben sa pa lived in the cave at some point in his life. It is believed that Pabongkhapa Déchen Nyingpo also lived for some time here with his students in the 1930s. Before 1959, it was a monk's institution, and since the 1930s, has belonged to the Pabongkha Lama's estate.
