= Drakri Hermitage =

Religion
- Affiliation: Tibetan Buddhism

Location
- Location: Lhasa Prefecture, Tibet, China
- Country: China

Drakri Hermitage is a historic hermitage in Tibet, belonging to Sera Monastery. It is located about 3 kilometres (1.9 mi) northeast of Lhasa, on a mountainside.

== Structure ==
The hermitage grounds consist of five sections:

- The main temple compound, renovated around a courtyard and comprised:
  - Temple
  - Kitchen
  - Monks' living quarters
- Terraced complex: Formerly stables and living quarters, now in ruins
- Building foundations: Formerly monks' living quarters, also in ruins
- Stable for dzo (a yak–cow hybrid)
- Huts: Nuns' living quarters

== History ==
While the hermitage (whose name derives from brag ri, meaning "crag" or "gorge") is believed to have been founded during the 18th century, little documentation of its early history exists. In 1959, the monks were evicted and Drakri was converted into a prison with a reputation for severity. With the expansion of other prisons in Lhasa, Drakri was eventually abandoned.

During the 1980s a representative of a rival sect to that of the original owners (headed by the Bari Lama) began restoration work on the hermitage to convert it to a Nyingma practice center. In response to objections raised by a representative of the previous owner (who was, however, unable to renovate the estate himself), the Nyingma devotee has asserted that he is renovating the hermitage in stewardship rather than ownership.
