= Trashi Chöling Hermitage =

- Location within Tibet

Religion
- Affiliation: Tibetan Buddhism

Location
- Location: Lhasa Prefecture, Tibet, China
- Country: China
- Interactive map of Trashi Chöling Hermitage
- Coordinates: 29.900282°N 93.337136°E

Trashi Chöling Hermitage is a historical hermitage, belonging to Sera Monastery. It is located north of Lhasa in Tibet.

== Footnotes ==
The Tibetan and Himalayan Library
