= Keutsang East Hermitage =

Historical hermitage belonging to Sera Monastery

Religion
- Affiliation: Tibetan Buddhism

Location
- Location: Lhasa Prefecture, Tibet, China
- Country: China

Keutsang East Hermitage is a historical hermitage, belonging to Sera Monastery. It is located north of Lhasa in Tibet.

== Footnotes ==
The Tibetan and Himalayan Library
