= Central Symposium on Work in Tibet =

Chinese Communist Party gathering

- Simplified Chinese: 中央西藏工作座谈会
- Traditional Chinese: 中央西藏工作座談會
Transcriptions
Standard Mandarin
- Hanyu Pinyin: Zhōngyāng Xīzàng Gōngzuò Zuòtánhuì

The Central Symposium on Work in Tibet is an event held in Beijing by the Chinese Communist Party regarding its operations in Tibet. To date, there have been seven Tibet work conferences; in 1980, 1984, 1994, 2001, 2010, 2015 and 2020.

== The first symposium ==
On March 14 and 15, 1980, Hu Yaobang, the General Secretary of the Central Committee's Secretariat, chaired the First Symposium on Tibet Work (Chinese: 第一次西藏工作座谈会) in Beijing. The Tibet Autonomous Regional Committee of the Chinese Communist Party presented its work report to the Secretariat of the Central Committee. Leaders from the Central Secretariat, the Central United Front Work Department, and other pertinent departments participated at the meeting. In accordance with the principles established during the Third Plenary Session of the Eleventh Central Committee, the participants engaged in discussions regarding the affairs of the Tibet region, delineated the challenges confronting Tibet, and identified the necessary guidelines and policies to be addressed, culminating in the Summary of the Symposium on the Work of Tibet.

== The second symposium ==
The Second Symposium on Tibet Work (Chinese: 第二次西藏工作座谈会), called by the central government, pertains to a series of meetings of the Central Committee of the Chinese Communist Party conducted in Beijing from February to March 1984, presided over by Hu Yaobang.

== The third symposium ==
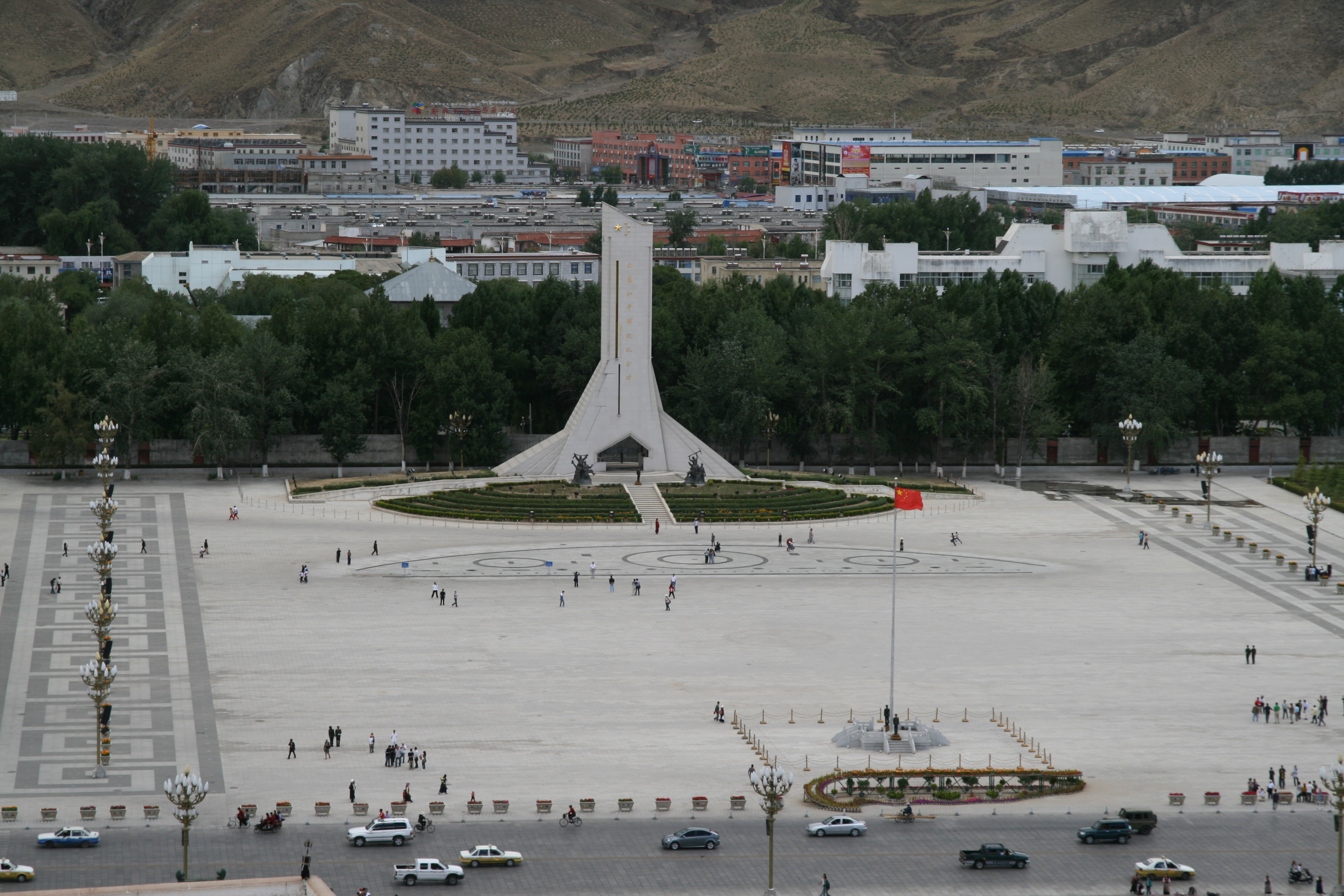
A view of Potala Palace Square from the Potala Palace, which is a part of 62 Aid Projects to Tibet

The Central Committee of the Chinese Communist Party and the State Council held the Third Symposium on Tibet Work (Chinese: 第三次西藏工作座谈会) in Beijing from July 20 to 23, 1994.

== The fourth symposium ==
The Central Committee of the Chinese Communist Party and the State Council held the Fourth Symposium on Tibet Work (Chinese: 中央第四次西藏工作座谈会) in Beijing from June 25 to 27, 2001.

== The fifth symposium ==
The Fifth Symposium on Tibet Work (Chinese: 中央第五次西藏工作座谈会) of the Central Government occurred from January 18 to 20, 2010, in Beijing. Hu Jintao, General Secretary of the Chinese Communist Party, chaired the meeting.

== The sixth symposium ==
The Sixth Symposium on Tibet Work (Chinese: 中央第六次西藏工作座谈会) held from August 24 to 25, 2015, in Beijing. Xi Jinping, General Secretary of the Chinese Communist Party participated in the meeting and delivered the address.

== The seventh symposium ==
The Seventh Symposium on Tibet Work (Chinese: 第七次西藏工作座谈会) held in Beijing from August 28 to 29, 2020. Premier Li Keqiang chaired the meeting.

== See also ==
- Central Symposium on Work in Xinjiang
