= Bank of Tibet =

The Bank of Tibet (Tibetan: བོད་ལྗོངས་དངུལ་ཁང་, Wylie: bod ljongs dngul khang, Chinese: 西藏银行) is a joint-stock commercial bank located in Lhasa, Tibet Autonomous Region, People's Republic of China.

== History ==
Previously, the Tibet Autonomous Region hosted merely five commercial bank branches: Industrial and Commercial Bank of China, Agricultural Bank of China, Bank of China, China Construction Bank, and the Postal Savings Bank of China. These institutions were predominantly situated at or above the prefecture (city) level, resulting in an underdeveloped financial system at the county level, characterized by a scarcity of financial institutions and a restricted range of financial services. The central government convened the Fifth Symposium on Tibet Work and explicitly articulated the objective of "assisting Tibet in establishing local commercial banks." The China Banking Regulatory Commission, the Tibet Autonomous Regional Committee of the Chinese Communist Party and People's Government of Tibet Autonomous Region conducted extensive investigation and thorough validation about the establishment of a bank in Tibet.

On December 17, 2011, the Bank of Tibet received a financial license and an enterprise legal person business license, establishing itself as the inaugural local legal person bank in Tibet. On May 22, 2012, the Bank of Tibet officially commenced operations in Lhasa, with a capital infusion of 1.5 billion RMB.
