= 50th anniversary of the Tibet Autonomous Region =

The 50th Anniversary of the Tibet Autonomous Region (Chinese: 庆祝西藏自治区成立50周年) in 2015 consisted of a series of events conducted in September 2015 to honor Tibet Autonomous Region's founding.

== Preparation ==
From August 24 to 25, 2015, the Central Committee of the Chinese Communist Party convened the Sixth Symposium on Tibet Work in Beijing, delineating the guiding ideology, target requirements, and principal measures for future Tibet work.

On September 3, the state conducted a military parade to commemorate the 2015 China Victory Day Parade, necessitating an adjustment in the timing of the celebration for the 50th anniversary of the founding of the Tibet Autonomous Region. On September 6, the Central Delegation, led by Yu Zhengsheng, arrived in Lhasa to participate in the celebrations. The delegation consisted of 65 members from 38 central state organs and 17 provinces and municipalities that assist Tibet. The deputy heads of the delegation included Liu Yandong, Sun Chunlan, Du Qinglin, Qiangba Puncog, Pagbalha Geleg Namgyai, Raidi, and Zhang Yang.

== Engagements ==
On September 8, around 20,000 individuals from many sectors in Tibet convened at the Potala Palace Square in Lhasa to commemorate the 50th anniversary of the establishment of the Tibet Autonomous Region. Xi Jinping, General Secretary of the Chinese Communist Party, inscribed a celebratory plaque with the phrase "Strengthening national unity and building a beautiful Tibet." Yu Zhengsheng, a member of the Politburo Standing Committee of the Chinese Communist Party, Chairman of the National Committee of the Chinese People's Political Consultative Conference, and leader of the Central Delegation, participated in the celebratory meeting and delivered a speech.

== Remembrance ==
The 50th Anniversary Gold and Silver Commemorative Coin is a collection of gold and silver coins released by the People's Bank of China on July 16, 2015, to honor the 50th anniversary of the establishment of the Tibet Autonomous Region. The collection comprises two commemorative coins: one gold and one silver, both recognized as legal money in the People's Republic of China.

China Post released a series of three commemorative stamps on September 1, 2015, to mark the Fiftieth Anniversary of the Establishment of the Tibet Autonomous Region.

== See also ==
- 20th anniversary of the Tibet Autonomous Region
- 30th anniversary of the Tibet Autonomous Region
- 40th anniversary of the Tibet Autonomous Region
- 60th anniversary of the Tibet Autonomous Region
- Sixth Symposium on Tibet Work
