= First Symposium on Tibet Work =

On March 14 and 15, 1980, Hu Yaobang, the General Secretary of the Central Committee's Secretariat, chaired the First Symposium on Tibet Work (Chinese: 第一次西藏工作座谈会) in Beijing. The Tibet Autonomous Regional Committee of the Chinese Communist Party presented its work report to the Secretariat of the Central Committee. Leaders from the Central Secretariat, the Central United Front Work Department, and other pertinent departments participated at the meeting. In accordance with the principles established during the Third Plenary Session of the Eleventh Central Committee, the participants engaged in discussions regarding the affairs of the Tibet region, delineated the challenges confronting Tibet, and identified the necessary guidelines and policies to be addressed, culminating in the Summary of the Symposium on the Work of Tibet.

== History ==
In April 1980, the Central Committee of the Chinese Communist Party sanctioned the Summary of the Symposium on Tibetan Work. The Minutes explicitly articulated that the primary objective of the Tibet Autonomous Region was to enhance the national economy, elevate the material living standards of all ethnic groups, fortify the frontier, strengthen national defense, and systematically ensure the prosperity and wealth of Tibet. To ensure the execution of this task, the Central Government emphasizes the development of guidelines and policies tailored to the specific circumstances in Tibet. It allows the leading organs of the Party and People's Government of Tibet to either abstain from implementing or to adapt the guidelines, policies, and systems established by the Central Government and its various departments, as well as the national documents and directives, when these are deemed unsuitable for Tibet's actual situation. Nonetheless, significant matters ought to be addressed beforehand, while ordinary issues should be reported subsequently. The Central Committee directed the CCP TAR Committee to thoroughly evaluate its previous efforts, build upon its successes, address its deficiencies, and amend its errors. The economic development plan for the entire region should be reassessed, addressing various "left" deviations in policy matters including agricultural and livestock production, foreign trade, economic management systems, reserved land, reserved livestock, and family auxiliary industries, thereby enabling the populace to recuperate, enhance production, and elevate their living standards.

On April 7, the CCP Central Committee released the Notice about the Dissemination of the Summary of the Symposium on Tibet Work (Chinese: 《关于转发〈西藏工作座谈会纪要〉的通知》). The primary objective of the Tibet Autonomous Region is to concentrate on Tibetan officials and the Tibetan populace, enhance the cohesion among officials and individuals of all ethnicities, harness all beneficial elements, and, based on the specific circumstances of Tibet, advance the national economy through various means, elevate the material living standards of all ethnic groups, as well as their cultural and scientific development, fortify the border, strengthen national defense, and systematically ensure the prosperity and wealth of Tibet.

== Policy ==
In late May 1980, Hu Yaobang and Wan Li directed the heads of pertinent Central Government departments to Tibet for inspection and guidance, aiming to assist in the implementation of the symposium's principles. On May 29, during a general meeting of the cadres of the Tibet Autonomous Region, Hu Yaobang articulated the strategic objective of "endeavoring to construct a united, prosperous, and civilized new Tibet" for the first time. The central government mandated Tibet to accomplish six primary tasks within a specified time-frame:

1. Under the unified leadership of the Central Government, it must fully exercise its authority regarding regional ethnic autonomy;
2. Given Tibet's current challenging circumstances, a policy of rest and recuperation should be enacted to alleviate the burdens on the populace;
3. A special and flexible approach should be adopted in all economic policies to foster production development;
4. The substantial funds allocated by the State for Tibet's support should be utilized for agricultural and pastoral development as well as for the urgent daily needs of the Tibetan people;
5. The scientific initiatives of the Tibetans should be vigorously advanced while maintaining adherence to the socialist framework;
6. The Party's policy concerning ethnic cadres should be properly implemented, and the solidarity between Tibetan and Chinese cadres should be reinforced.

Tibet has exempted from taxes and purchases for three to five years (1981–1986), and the financial subsidy provided by the central government in 1980 served as the baseline, increasing by 10 percent yearly starting in 1981. In 1983, the State Council decided that under the guideline of adhering to the national support for Tibet, four places - Sichuan, Zhejiang, Shanghai and Tianjin, would focus on counterpart support for Tibet.

== Outcomes ==
Subsequent to the inaugural Tibet Work Conference, the Central Government, considering Tibet's specific circumstances and the national economic context, boosted its support for Tibet and established a range of preferential policies for the region. The average annual flat-rate subsidy was raised to 496 million yuan, with other special allocations amounting to 0.9 billion yuan, and capital investment of 262.2 million yuan. The inaugural symposium on labor in Tibet, coupled with the implementation of the Central Government's support and specialized policies, resulted in the extraordinary development of modern industrial and transportation infrastructure in Tibet, establishing a solid foundation for modernization.

== See also ==
- Second Symposium on Tibet Work in 1984
  - 43 Aid Projects to Tibet
- Third Symposium on Tibet Work in 1994
  - 62 Aid Projects to Tibet
- Fourth Symposium on Tibet Work in 2001
- Fifth Symposium on Tibet Work in 2010
- Sixth Symposium on Tibet Work in 2015
- Seventh Symposium on Tibet Work in 2020
