= Sixth Symposium on Tibet Work =

Meeting in Beijing

The Sixth Symposium on Tibet Work (Chinese: 中央第六次西藏工作座谈会) held from August 24 to 25, 2015, in Beijing. Xi Jinping, General Secretary of the Chinese Communist Party participated in the meeting and delivered the address.

== Procedure ==
The meeting delineated the Chinese Communist Party's policy for managing Tibet, emphasizing adherence to the leadership of the party, the socialist system, and the framework of regional ethnic autonomy. The meeting evaluated Tibet's progress since the establishment of China, particularly following the Fifth Symposium on Tibet Work. Xi also highlighted the significance of Tibet: "To govern a nation, we must control its borders, and to control its borders, we must first stabilize Tibet" (Chinese: 治国必治边、治边先稳藏). It elucidated the guiding ideology, target requirements, and principal initiatives for current and future endeavors in Tibet, and strategically outlined efforts to enhance economic and social development as well as ensure long-term peace and stability in the region. The meeting also facilitated a thorough implementation of development and stabilization efforts in the Tibetan regions of Sichuan, Yunnan, Gansu, and Qinghai Provinces.

== See also ==
- First Symposium on Tibet Work in 1980
- Second Symposium on Tibet Work in 1984
  - 43 Aid Projects to Tibet
- Third Symposium on Tibet Work in 1994
  - 62 Aid Projects to Tibet
- Fourth Symposium on Tibet Work in 2001
- Fifth Symposium on Tibet Work in 2010
- 50th anniversary of the Tibet Autonomous Region in 2015
- Seventh Symposium on Tibet Work in 2020
- 60th anniversary of the Tibet Autonomous Region in 2025
