= Central Symposium on Work in Xinjiang =

Chinese Communist Party gathering

- Simplified Chinese: 中央新疆工作座谈会
- Traditional Chinese: 中央新疆工作座談會
Transcriptions
Standard Mandarin
- Hanyu Pinyin: Zhōngyāng Xīnjiāng Gōngzuò Zuòtánhuì

The Central Symposium on Work in Xinjiang is an event held in Beijing by the Chinese Communist Party regarding its operations in Xinjiang. To date, there have been three Xinjiang work conferences; in 2010, 2014 and 2020.

== The first symposium ==
The first Central Symposium on Work in Xinjiang was held in Beijing in May 2010 by the Central Committee of the Chinese Communist Party and the State Council. At the conference, CCP general secretary Hu Jintao set the goals of bringing Xinjiang's GDP per capita in line with the national average by 2015 and mostly eliminating poverty in the region by 2020.

== The second symposium ==
The second Central Symposium on Work in Xinjiang was held in Beijing in May 2014. CCP general secretary Xi Jinping delivered a speech at the meeting. The meeting was chaired by Premier Li Keqiang, while Chinese People's Political Consultative Conference National Committee Chairman Yu Zhengsheng gave a concluding speech.

=== Xi Jinping's speech ===
In his speech, which came a month after the 2014 Kunming attack and a few days after the May 2014 Ürümqi attack just after Xi's visit to Xinjiang, Xi focused on stability, stating that Xinjiang's stability was the foundation of the entire nation's stability. He argued that while focusing on economic development was right, it alone was not enough, noting that Yugoslavia was "originally a country with good economic and living standards, but it finally fell apart". Xi argued that "This shows that economic development does not naturally bring about long-term peace and stability, and issues pertaining to development cannot be used to substitute issues pertaining to stability." He added that Xinjiang's terrorism problems were of external nature: "As I said before, there are ‘seeds’ outside the [national] borders, the ‘soil’ within the borders, and a ‘market’ online – these are the main causes behind the highly active occurrence of violent terrorist activities in Xinjiang". Xi considered stability maintenance work in Xinjiang to be "at a historical stage" and said "[w]e must have strong faith in our victory, make a determined effort, and even have to pay a special price sometimes". Xi said:

In the face of rampant violent terrorist activities and frenzied violent terrorists, we must focus our current fight on a severe crackdown on violent terrorist activities. We must not hesitate or waver in the use of the weapons of the people’s democratic dictatorship and focus our energy on executing a crushing blow that buys us time and initiative for solving the deep-seated issues regarding Xinjiang’s long-term peace and stability.

He proposed a "painful period of interventionary treatment" for Xinjiang and called for "preemptive control of the enemy". He said in Xinjiang, "intelligence work is overall weak", meaning counterterrorism work resembled "fighting against the enemy with a black eye". He said the authorities must "compare and correlate massive amounts of data" but also that technology cannot fully replace human work. Xi argues that it is a "political mistake" to deemphasize the difference between ethnic groups, adding such differences decrease only as a "result of a long process of social development". He instead says China "must unswervingly adhere to the party's ethnic policies and the system of ethnic regional autonomy". Xi expressed concern about the rising ethnic tensions between Uyghurs and Han people, and condemns ethnic discrimination. He argues that discrimination leads to "ethnic groups living in separate communities", which should be countered with "a social structure and community environment where all ethnic groups are mutually embedded in each other". Xi proposes the following policies:

The scale of Xinjiang's ethnic minorities receiving education, employment, and residence in other parts of China will be expanded in an orderly manner, promoting deeper understanding and stronger bonds among people of all ethnic groups through shared production, life, work, and study.

Xi warns of unemployment among ethnic minorities, stating large number of unemployment people would "provoke trouble". He proposes ethnic minorities to be put to enterprise work which is "conducive to ethnic interaction, exchanges and blending" and thus helps them "resist religious extremist thinking" as well as make them "unobtrusively study Chinese culture". Xi quotes the term "hug each other tightly like pomegranate seeds" for various ethnic groups in Xinjiang, which he says was coined by an Uyghur cadre a few days after the Kunming attack. He calls on for greater interactions between different ethnic groups:

Cadres and people of all ethnic groups must move to interact with each other on multiple levels, in multiple ways, and in multiple forms. This is an important task that must be done under the current situation. ... Party and government agencies, enterprises and institutions, civic organizations, and democratic parties must take the initiative to do something harmonious and with sentiment. Uyghur and Han cadres and workers must engage in activities together and find a weekend once a month to do an activity together. Cadres of all ethnic groups can take the initiative to drop by, to visit, to take their family members and children and go on walks together, chat, have a meal, all of these are viable options.

Xi speaks of a "heart disease" in Xinjiang:

Heart disease requires heart medicine. For Xinjiang, this "heart medicine" is a correct view of the motherland and nation, Chinese culture, the core value system of socialism and the core values of socialism. It is necessary to use this medicine to support the correct, remove evil, strengthen the body, and strengthen the heart. We must adopt effective measures to strengthen the recognition that people of all ethnic groups identify with the great motherland, the Chinese nation, the Chinese culture, and the road to socialism with Chinese characteristics.

Xi also warns of religious extremism:

Religious extremism is a powerful psychedelic drug. Under its toxic influence, some people become obsessed with "martyrdom." When committing violent and terrorist crimes, these people often lose their lives through their stubborn resistance – out of fear that they may not die. Some persons – even whole families – become reckless criminals. Without eradicating the violent and terrorist ideology of religious extremism, violent terrorist activities will continue to replicate and multiply like cancer cells.

Xi calls on Xinjiang to implement Party policies regarding religion. He says that some cadres have expressed views including "development of Islam should be curbed" or that Islam should be "eliminated", which he said was "one-sided and even wrong". He cites Friedrich Engels in saying religions will eventually disappear with increasing material conditions and ideological awareness, but that this would take a long time. He calls on Xinjiang to be secularized:

It is necessary to vigorously disseminate modern cultural concepts and behaviors, produce large numbers of modern cultural products that transmit modern culture in their values, convey the real life of ethnic minorities in their contents, and appeal to the public through their styles and techniques, so as to guide the masses towards secularization and modernization in their spiritual and emotional interests. A secularized atmosphere has to be vigorously cultivated and promoted, and continuously maintained. Xinjiang has long been known as the land of songs and dances, where multiple cultures coexist.

=== Li Keqiang's speech ===
In his speech, Premier Li Keqiang notes that there were "about 3 million urban and rural laborers in Xinjiang who need to find employment, which is equivalent to about one-sixth of the labor force in the region", especially in southern Xinjiang. He adds "P]eople without land, employment or a fixed income have nothing to do and wander around all day; not only will this breed dissatisfaction, but they will also be easily exploited by evildoers". Li adds:

There is an old saying in Xinjiang, "I would rather eat bread at home than eat mutton soup outside." On the one hand, this shows people's strong feelings for their hometown, while on the other, it indicates that their awareness regarding [the need for] leaving their hometown to work or start a business is weak. Changing this situation requires patience and time, as well as improving the management [and] training methods for new employees.

Li added that Xinjiang authorities must "transform [people’s] way of thinking about employment" and "vigorously develop labor-intensive industries that absorb more employment", arguing the Southern Xinjiang unemployment situation is "urgent'. Li also calls for increased planting of cotton, support for textile and apparel industries, increase in sustainable development strategies to conserve Xinjiang's ecology, and an expansion of Standard Chinese education. Li focused on the scarcity of water, stating it was the "biggest bottleneck in Xinjiang's development, the shortcoming of shortcomings".

=== Yu Zhengsheng's speech ===
Yu Zhengsheng gave a concluding speech at the conference on 29 May, stating Xinjiang needed a "painful period of interventionary treatment". He added:

We must thoroughly comprehend that doing a proper job in Xinjiang is not only a matter of concern for the region, but also a major issue for the whole party and the entire country. If the Xinjiang situation is not handled properly, it will influence the overall situation regarding reform, development and stability throughout the country, as well as the realization of the Two Centennial Goals.

Yu stated the conference had "put forward a series of new ideas, new measures, and new requirements for Xinjiang Work", adding:

The Central Government's major policy direction regarding Xinjiang Work has been decided. The key is to seize the opportunity to implement [these policies]. Implementation is the pivotal link in doing all the work well. Carrying out the spirit of the meeting [Second Central Xinjiang Work Forum] is an important test of the work ability and work style of the leading cadres at all levels. We cannot falter at the expense of the party, we cannot bargain for discounts, and we have to be firm in our party spirit as a guarantee that we are determined to put the central [government’s] decisions and deployments into practice.

Yu then talked about Xinjiang's economic conditions:

Given that southern Xinjiang has poor natural conditions, a weak economic foundation, poor employment conditions, a monolithic population structure, many people with [economic] difficulties, a distorted religious atmosphere, a complicated surrounding environment, and a situation involving severe struggles, how can we solve the problems of Southern Xinjiang, maintain social stability and realize long-term peace and stability without implementing special policies?

Yu stated that economic goals "must absolutely be subservient to [the goals of] social and long-term peace and stability" and added:

For example, in Xinjiang, the requirements for the development of laborintensive industries are particularly urgent. Although these industries may not contribute more to economic growth and taxation than other industries, they are particularly important for employment and for promoting exchanges and the integration of various ethnic groups.

Yu then continued:

For example, a series of supporting policies and requirements have been put forward for the development of the textile and garment industry, which is to drive at least one million people into employment. This matter is of vital importance to Xinjiang’s social stability and long-term stability. To develop the textile and garment industry, we must rely on the environment, make enterprises willing to transfer their production [to Xinjiang]…

Yu mentioned the Pairing Assistance Program:

To strengthen the coordination and planning of projects funded by the Pairing Assistance [program]....For example, focusing on employment, education, talent recruitment, etc., we should put into consideration the number of labor-intensive enterprises to be brought in[to Xinjiang], the number of Xinjiang workers to be employed in the Mainland, the number of bilingual teachers and vocational education teachers to be supported and trained, the extent to which bilingual education and vocational education should be popularized, the number of talents to be introduced and the number of talents to be trained, etc. These factors should be included in the project planning of [the] Pairing Assistance [program], enforcing responsibility and conducting strict assessments.

Yu stated centrally-managed state-owned enterprises are in Xinjiang not just to produce but also form "propaganda teams" to "promote national unity and propagate party policies," and "carry out indepth education on ethnic and religious policies".

== The third symposium ==
The third Central Symposium on Work in Xinjiang was held in Beijing on 25 to 26 September 2020. CCP general secretary Xi Jinping delivered a speech at the meeting. The meeting was chaired by Premier Li Keqiang, and was attended by Li Zhanshu, Wang Huning, Zhao Leji, and Han Zheng, while Wang Yang gave a concluding speech. Xi told the meeting that "Viewed overall, Xinjiang is enjoying a favorable setting of social stability with the people living in peace and contentment" and that "The facts have abundantly demonstrated that our national minority work has been a success". He added that Xinjiang policies have been "totally correct" and "it must be held to for the long term".

== See also ==
- Central Symposium on Work in Tibet
