= Seventh Symposium on Tibet Work =

The Seventh Symposium on Tibet Work (Chinese: 第七次西藏工作座谈会) held in Beijing from August 28 to 29, 2020. Premier Li Keqiang chaired the meeting.

== Process ==
All seven Politburo Standing Committee of the Chinese Communist Party, Xi Jinping, Li Zhanshu, Li Keqiang, Wang Huning, Zhao Leji, Han Zheng, and Wang Yang, attended the meeting. The meeting concluded that, in light of the new circumstances and tasks, it is imperative to thoroughly execute the CCP's strategy for governing Tibet in the new era, uphold the comprehensive framework of the "Five-in-One" (Chinese: 五位一体) and the strategic structure of the Four Comprehensives, maintain the overarching principle of pursuing progress while ensuring stability, cultivate a robust sense of community among the Chinese nation, improve developmental quality, and ensure the safety and security of the Tibetan populace. Foster awareness of the Chinese national community, elevate developmental quality, protect and enhance citizens' livelihoods, advance the establishment of an ecological civilization, fortify the organization of the Chinese Communist Party and its political framework, guarantee national security and enduring peace and stability, ensure the continuous improvement of living standards, maintain a healthy ecological environment, secure the reinforcement of border defenses and border security, and diligently strive to create a united, prosperous, civilized, harmonious, and aesthetically pleasing modernized socialist new Tibet.

== See also ==
- First Symposium on Tibet Work in 1980
- Second Symposium on Tibet Work in 1984
  - 43 Aid Projects to Tibet
- Third Symposium on Tibet Work in 1994
  - 62 Aid Projects to Tibet
- Fourth Symposium on Tibet Work in 2001
- Fifth Symposium on Tibet Work in 2010
- Sixth Symposium on Tibet Work in 2015
- 60th anniversary of the Tibet Autonomous Region in 2025
