= Woka River-I Hydropower Station =

Hydropower station in Shannon, Tibet, China

Coordinates: 29.31°N 92.23°E

Woka River-I Hydropower Station 沃卡河一级水电站
- Interactive map of Woka River-I Hydropower Station 沃卡河一级水电站
- Country: China
- Location: Sangri County, Shannan City, Tibet
- Purpose: Power, irrigation
- Construction began: April 1996
- Construction cost: ¥861.1 million

The Woka River-I Hydropower Station (Chinese: 沃卡河一级水电站), also spelled Wokahe First-cascade Hydro Station, is a water conservancy project in Tibet, located in Sangri County, Shannan City.

Woka River-I Hydropower Station is one of the 62 Aid Projects to Tibet (62项援藏工程) identified by the Central Committee of the Chinese Communist Party. The hydropower station is mainly for hydroelectric power generation and has a small-scale irrigation function, and the construction was undertaken by the Third Corps of Armed Police Hydropower Troops (武警水电第三总队).

== History ==
The construction of the project started in April 1996 with an investment of ¥861.1 million by the China Development Bank and was completed on 12 October 2000 with a total installed capacity of 20,000 kilowatts. It has an annual power generation capacity of 73 million kilowatt hours.
