= Second Symposium on Tibet Work =

The Second Symposium on Tibet Work (Chinese: 第二次西藏工作座谈会), called by the central government, pertains to a series of meetings of the Central Committee of the Chinese Communist Party conducted in Beijing from February to March 1984, presided over by Hu Yaobang.

== Conference ==
At the Second Symposium on Tibetan Work, senior CCP leaders reviewed the work reports from Tibet Autonomous Regional Committee of the Chinese Communist Party and People's Government of Tibet Autonomous Region officials, as well as addresses by relevant authorities, and facilitated visits for Tibetan cadres to rapidly developing coastal regions. This meeting discussed Tibet's developments since 1980 and assessed the potential for additional economic policy relaxation to expedite the prosperity of the Tibetan populace, considering the current circumstances in Tibet. The conference acknowledged the accomplishments of Tibet's efforts since 1980. The Central Committee established a series of economic policies and reform initiatives tailored to the specific circumstances of Tibet. To commemorate the 20th anniversary of the Tibet Autonomous Region, it was determined that the provinces and municipalities of Beijing, Shanghai, Tianjin, Jiangsu, Zhejiang, Fujian, Shandong, Sichuan, and Guangdong, along with the Ministry of Water and Electricity, the Ministry of Agriculture, Animal Husbandry and Fisheries, and the State Bureau of Building Materials, would assist in the construction of 43 urgently needed small and medium-sized engineering projects in Tibet, in two phases, as per Tibet's requirements.

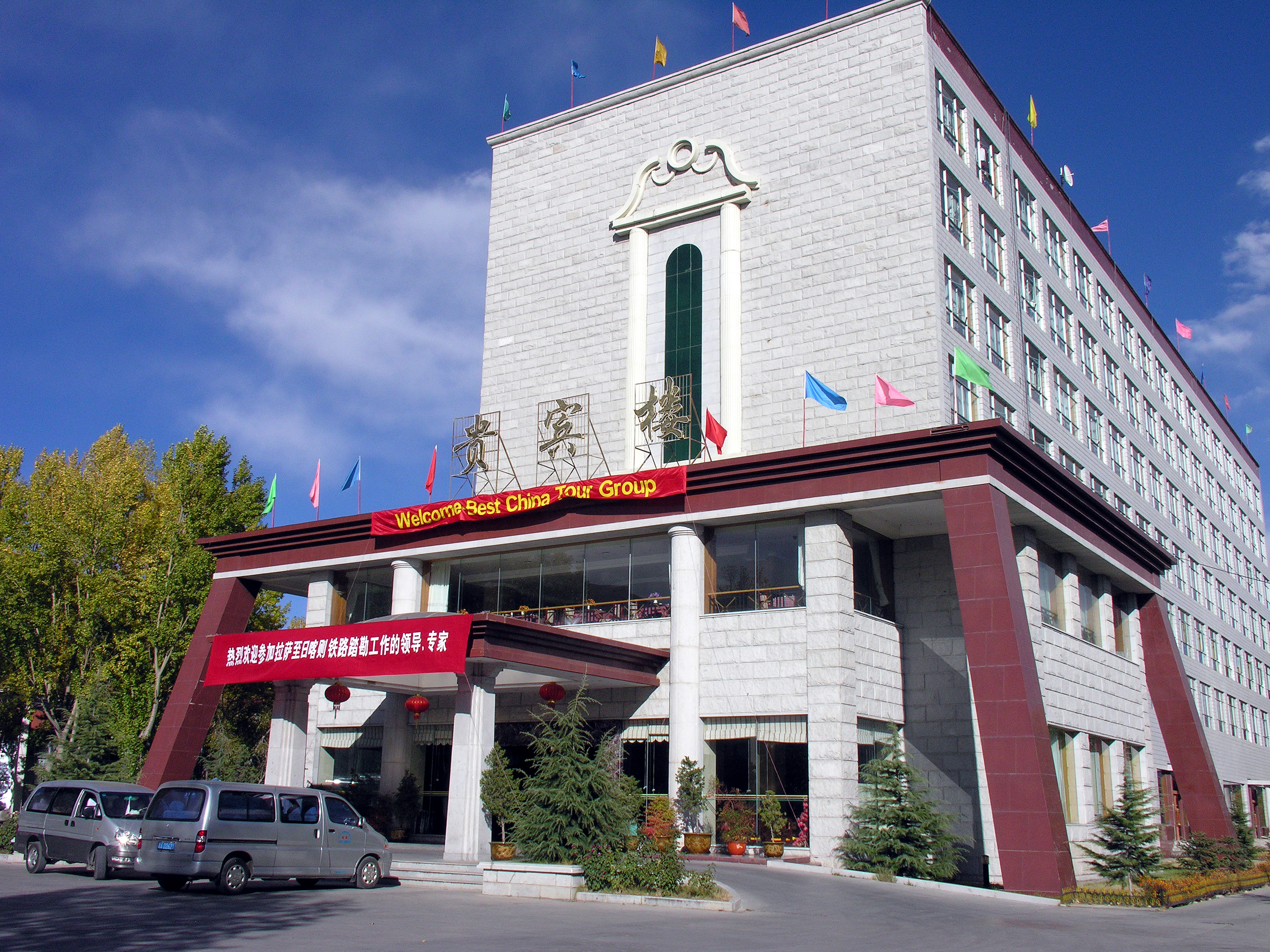
Tibet Hotel in Lhasa

Following extensive discussions, the meeting produced the "1984 Summary of the Tibet Work Symposium" (Chinese: 西藏工作座谈会纪要), which outlined the primary objectives for Tibet's long-term initiatives: to robustly advance energy resource development and the transportation sector; to further liberalize policies and enhance agriculture, animal husbandry, forestry, and ethnic handicrafts; to prioritize educational advancement and the flourishing of arts and culture; to facilitate external engagement and strengthen internal exchanges; to emphasize the importance of ethnicity, united front efforts, and religious affairs; and to meticulously nurture the development of ethnic groups, united front initiatives, and religious activities, alongside the rigorous training of ethnic cadres to elevate their cognitive and operational competencies.

== Outcomes ==
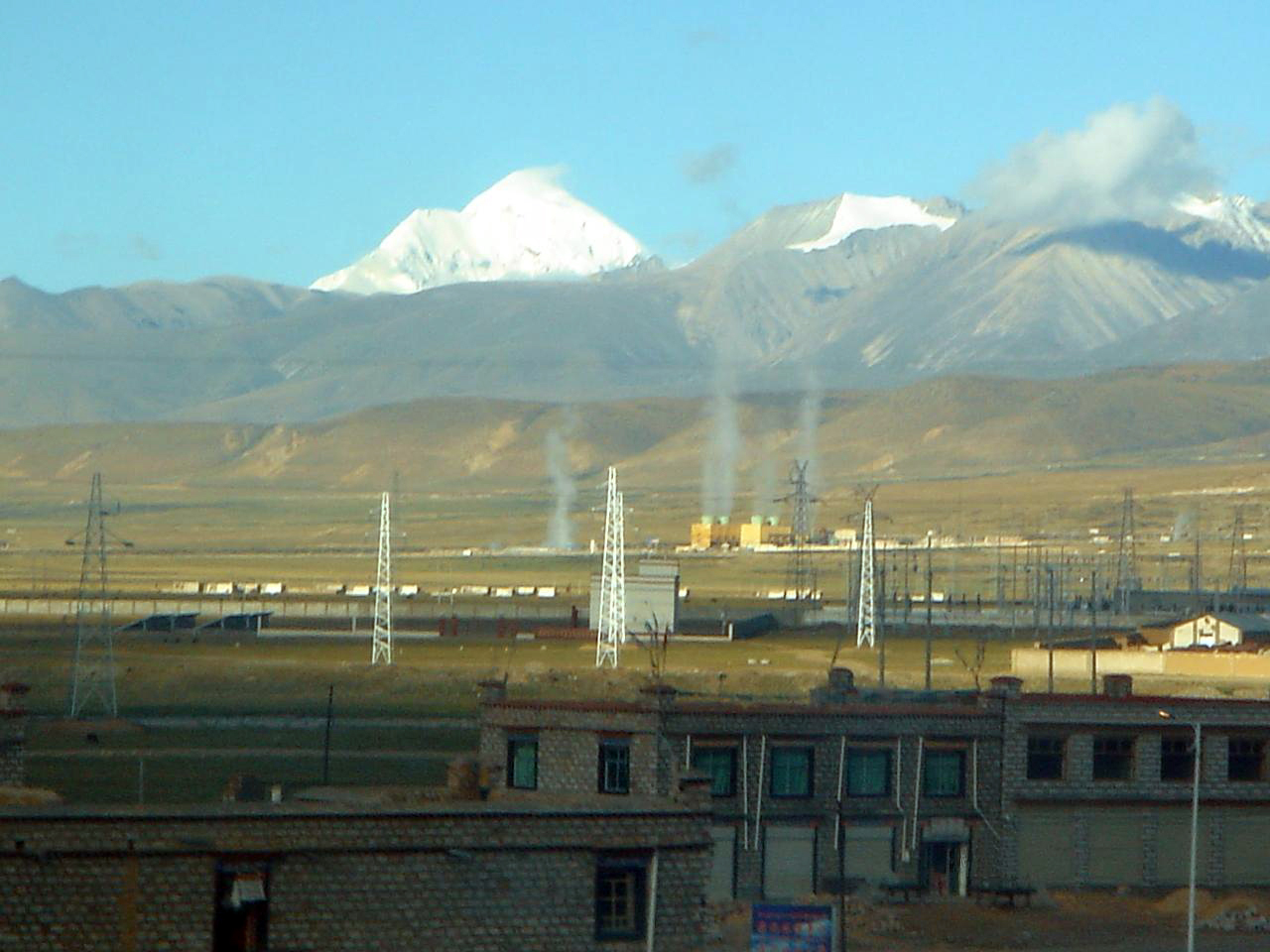
Yangbajain Geothermal Power Station

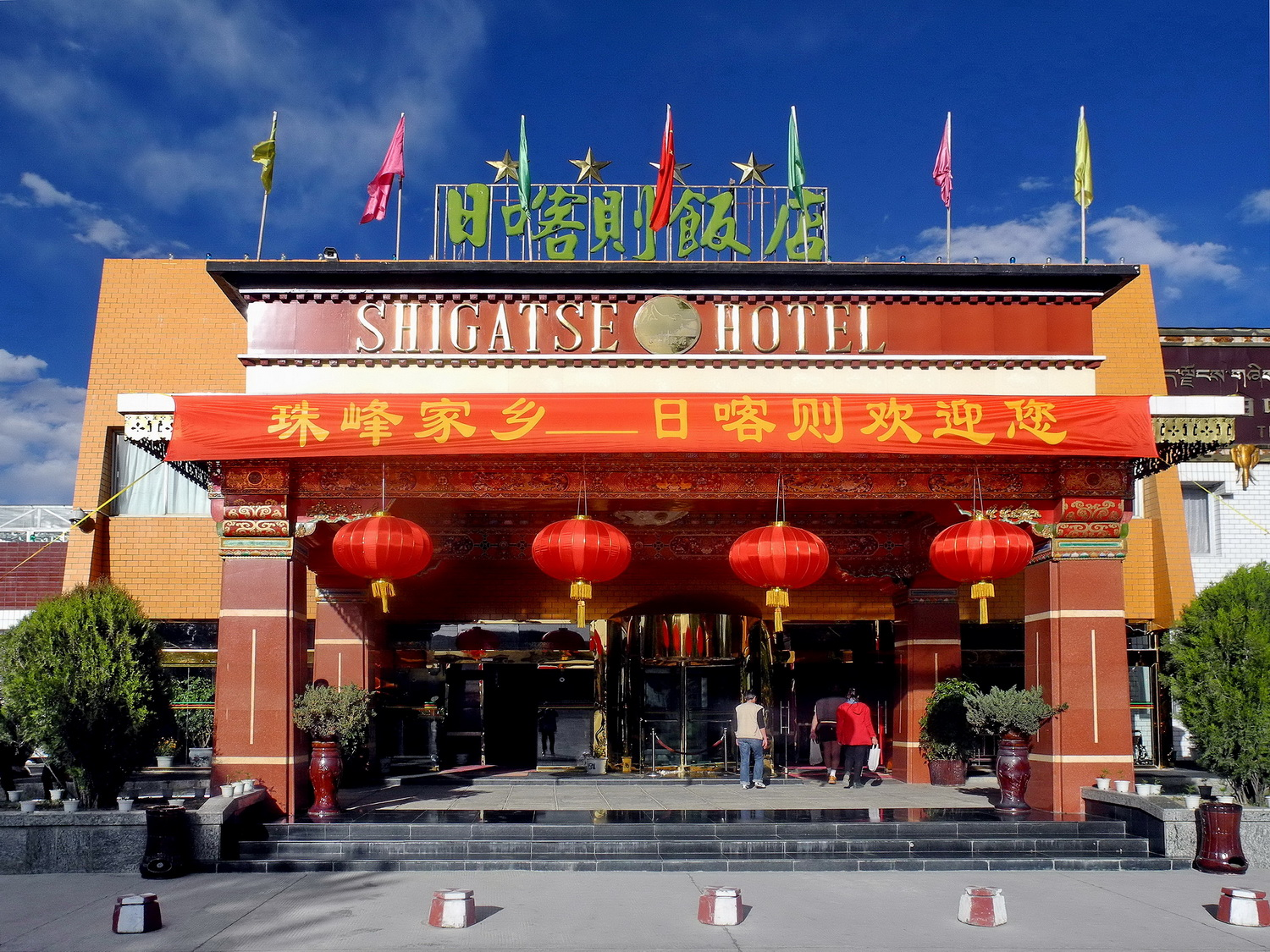
Shigatse Hotel

The initiation of this conference signified the commencement of a nationwide initiative to assist Tibet. During the meeting, the CCP Central Committee and the State Council resolved that nine provinces and municipalities would assist Tibet in constructing 43 urgently required small- and medium-sized engineering projects in the near future. The projects encompass 10 industries, with a cumulative investment of 480 million yuan and an aggregate building area of 236,000 square meters. The construction assistance method was termed "Key Projects" wherein contractors managed all aspects from design and construction to interior equipment and personnel training. Upon completion, the keys were transferred, enabling the projects to become operational and generate benefits. In the 1980s, 43 initiatives effectively addressed the social and economic development demands of Tibet, particularly within the tourism sector.

At the Second Symposium on Tibetan Work convened by the CCP Central Committee, a set of preferential policies aimed at fostering economic development in Tibet was established, including provisions for “land allocated to households for long-term self-management” and “livestock designated for household use, privately owned and reared, with long-term self-management.” Driven by the Second Symposium on Tibetan Work, the Tibetan rural economy has experienced significant development, transitioning from a closed system to an open, supply-driven, and business-oriented economy and society.

== See also ==
- First Symposium on Tibet Work in 1980
- 43 Aid Projects to Tibet
- 20th anniversary of the Tibet Autonomous Region in 1985
- Third Symposium on Tibet Work in 1994
  - 62 Aid Projects to Tibet
- Fourth Symposium on Tibet Work in 2001
- Fifth Symposium on Tibet Work in 2010
- Sixth Symposium on Tibet Work in 2015
- Seventh Symposium on Tibet Work in 2020
