= Third Symposium on Tibet Work =

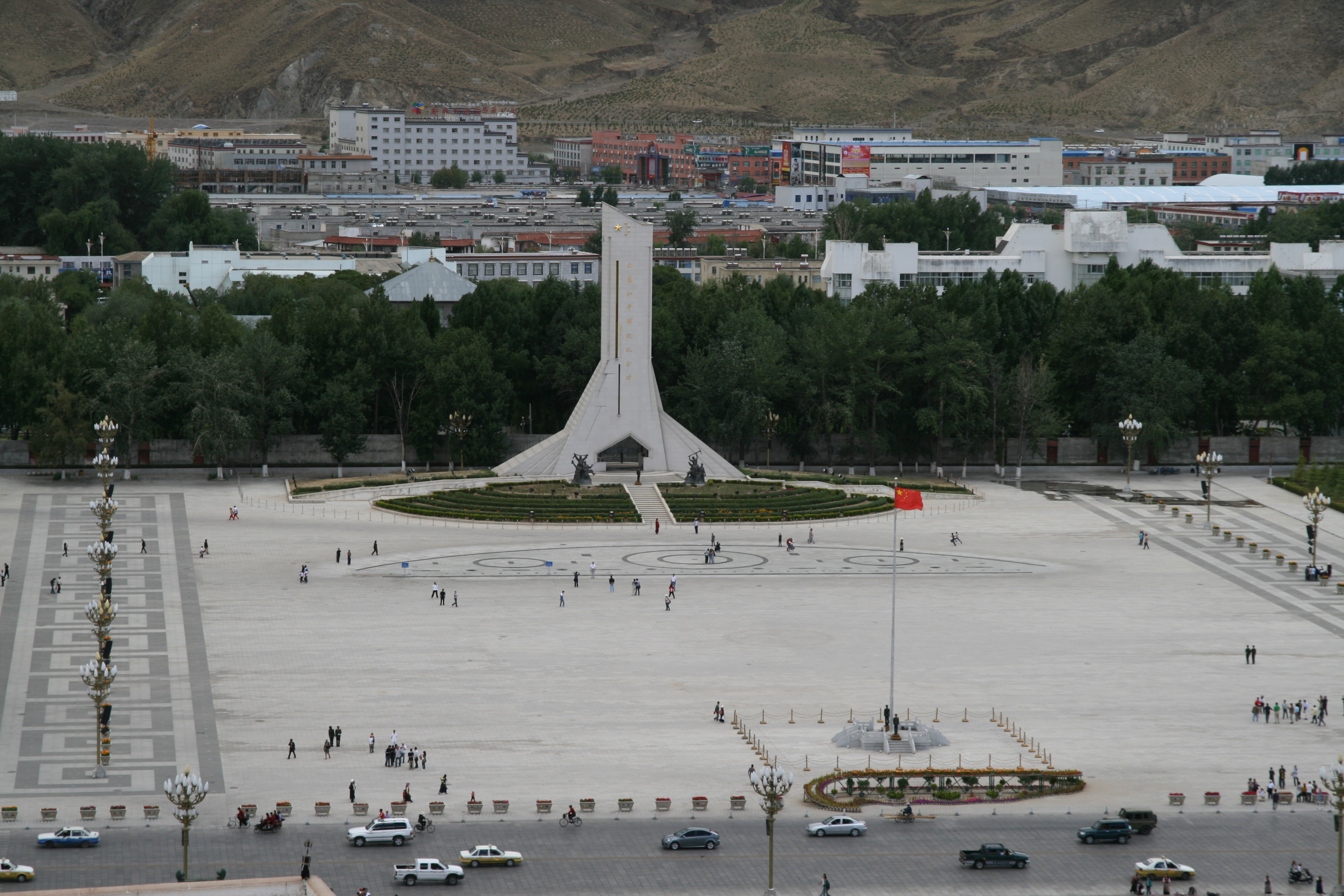
A view of Potala Palace Square from the Potala Palace, which is a part of 62 Aid Projects to Tibet

The Central Committee of the Chinese Communist Party and the State Council held the Third Symposium on Tibet Work (Chinese: 第三次西藏工作座谈会) in Beijing from July 20 to 23, 1994.

== History ==
Jiang Zemin, General Secretary of the Chinese Communist Party, Premier Li Peng, and Li Ruihuan, Chairman of the Standing Committee of the National People's Congress, spoke at the meeting. The Opinions on Accelerating Development and Maintaining Social Stability in Tibet, established by the meeting, encapsulated the historical experiences of Tibet's operations during that phase, assessed the prevailing circumstances in Tibet, delineated the guiding principles and objectives for future endeavors, and devised policies and measures to expedite development and uphold social stability in the region.

The conference directly resulted in the initiation of 62 construction projects, with a cumulative investment of 2.38 billion yuan to promote Tibet. It also established the principal decision of "counterpart assistance to Tibet, division of responsibilities, and regular rotation".

== See also ==
- First Symposium on Tibet Work in 1980
- Second Symposium on Tibet Work in 1984
  - 43 Aid Projects to Tibet
- 62 Aid Projects to Tibet
- Fourth Symposium on Tibet Work in 2001
- Fifth Symposium on Tibet Work in 2010
- Sixth Symposium on Tibet Work in 2015
- Seventh Symposium on Tibet Work in 2020
