= 60th anniversary of the Tibet Autonomous Region =

60th anniversary of the Tibet Autonomous Region 庆祝西藏自治区成立60周年
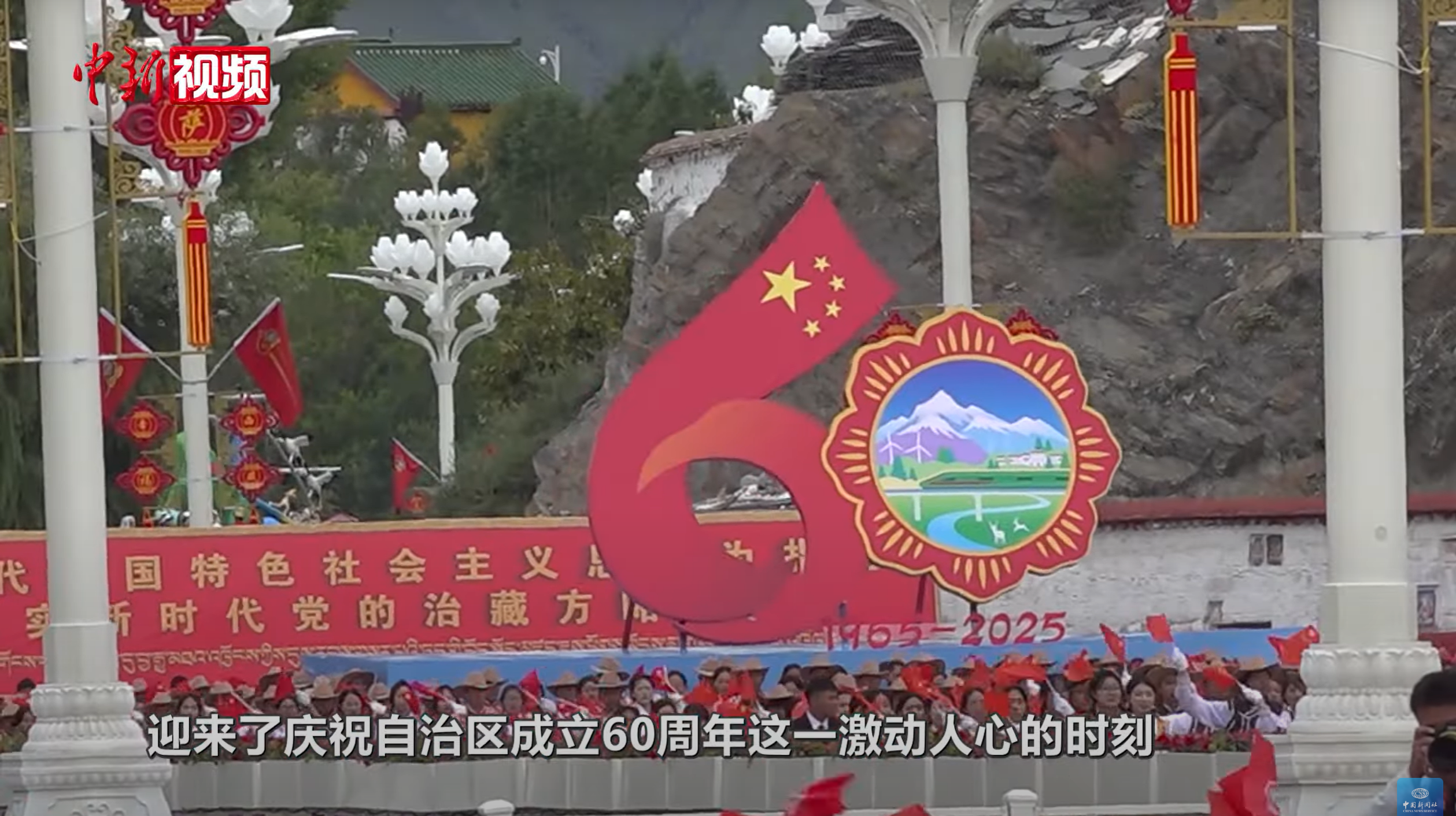
- Genre: Military parade, mass pageant, music and dance gala
- Date: 21 August 2025
- Locations: Tibet Autonomous Region, China
- Previous event: 50th anniversary of the Tibet Autonomous Region
- Participants: National leaders
- General Secretary of the CCP: Xi Jinping

The 60th Anniversary of the Tibet Autonomous Region (Chinese: 庆祝西藏自治区成立60周年) in 2025 consisted of a series of events conducted on 21 August 2025 to honor Tibet Autonomous Region's founding. Xi Jinping, General Secretary of the Chinese Communist Party, participated in the celebratory meeting, marking the first time the CCP General Secretary attended an event commemorating Tibet Autonomous Region's anniversary.

== Preparation ==
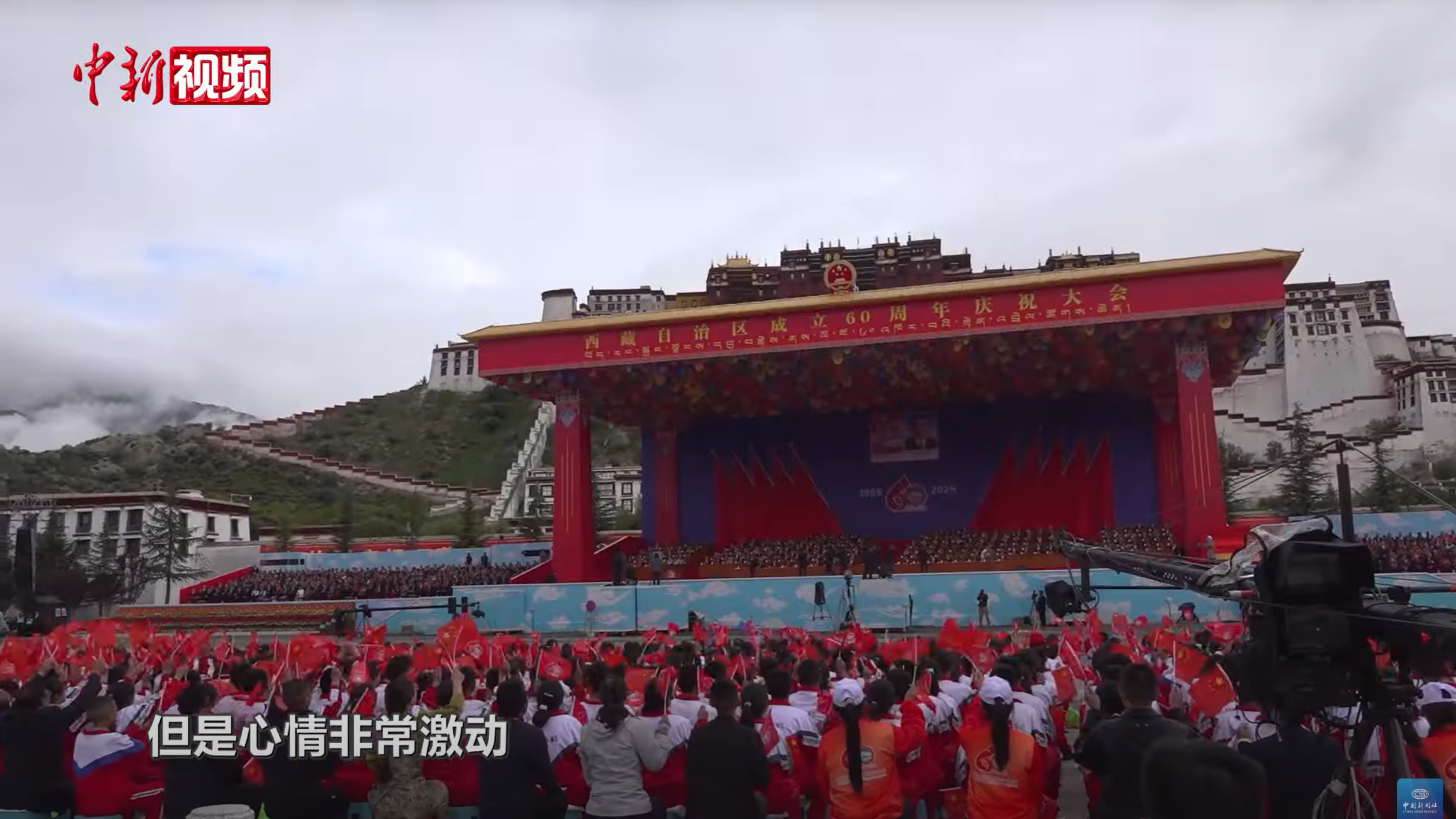
60th anniversary of the Tibet Autonomous Region

On August 5, 2025, the State Council Information Office hosted a press conference. It was reported that the Party Central Committee places a high value on the celebrations celebrating the 60th anniversary of the founding of the Tibet Autonomous Region. A centralised delegation would travel to Tibet to attend the memorial ceremony.

== Engagements ==
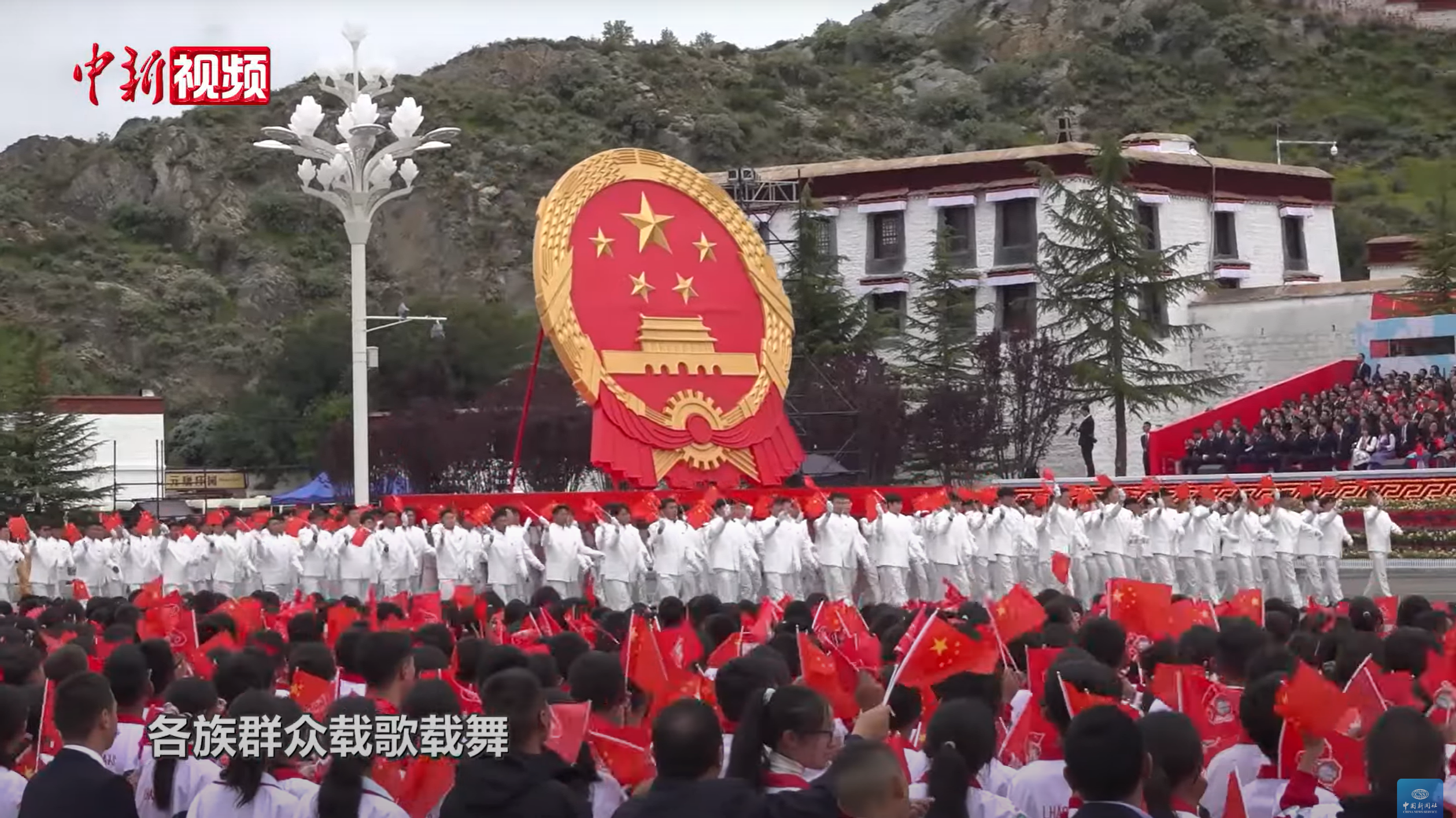
60th anniversary of the Tibet Autonomous Region

On August 21, around 20,000 individuals from many sectors in Tibet convened at the Potala Palace Square in Lhasa to commemorate the 60th anniversary of the establishment of the Tibet Autonomous Region. Xi Jinping, General Secretary of the Chinese Communist Party, participated in the celebratory meeting, marking the first time the CCP General Secretary attended an event commemorating Tibet Autonomous Region's anniversary. This also made Xi the first General Secretary to visit Tibet twice, having visited previously in 2021.

Garma Cedain, Deputy Secretary of the Tibet Autonomous Region Party Committee and Chairman of the People's Government of the Tibet Autonomous Region, declared the conference open. Zhang Guoqing, Vice Premier of the State Council, and Deputy Head of the Central Delegation, read out congratulatory messages from the Central Committee of the Chinese Communist Party, the Standing Committee of the National People's Congress, the State Council, the National Committee of the Chinese People's Political Consultative Conference, and the Central Military Commission on the occasion of the 60th anniversary of the establishment of the Tibet Autonomous Region. Wang Huning, a member of the Politburo Standing Committee of the Chinese Communist Party and the Chairman of the Chinese People's Political Consultative Conference, delivered a speech.

Subsequently, a grand mass parade was held and divided into four segments: "Flags Leading the Way," "Four Major Achievements," "Striving in the New Era," and "Marching Toward the Future," featuring 26 mass parade contingents and floats. Present at the event were Cai Qi, the Director of the General Office of the Chinese Communist Party, along with other central leaders including Li Ganjie, He Lifeng, Wang Xiaohong, Losang Jamcan, Hu Chunhua, Pagbalha Geleg Namgyai, and Zhang Shengmin.

On the afternoon, Xi Jinping met with representatives from various ethnic groups and sectors of Tibetan society, cadres assisting Tibet, responsible officials from the autonomous region and relevant departments, representatives of leading comrades from various prefectures and cities, representatives of judicial and police officers, patriotic figures from religious circles and representatives of temple management committee cadres, as well as senior officers at the rank of colonel and above from the military units stationed in Lhasa, along with some grassroots advanced models and civilian personnel.

== Remembrance ==
On August 7, 2025, the People's Bank of China announced the issuance of a set of gold and silver commemorative coins marking the 60th anniversary of the establishment of the Tibet Autonomous Region, scheduled for August 15, 2025. The set comprises two coins: one gold commemorative coin and one silver commemorative coin, both of which are legal tender of the People's Republic of China.

== See also ==
- 20th anniversary of the Tibet Autonomous Region
- 30th anniversary of the Tibet Autonomous Region
- 40th anniversary of the Tibet Autonomous Region
- 50th anniversary of the Tibet Autonomous Region
