= 20th anniversary of the Tibet Autonomous Region =

The 20th anniversary of the Tibet Autonomous Region (Chinese: 庆祝西藏自治区成立20周年) in 1985 consisted of a series of events conducted in September 1985 to honor Tibet Autonomous Region's founding.

== Preparation ==
On August 27, 1985, the Central Delegation reached Lhasa. Hu Qili, First Secretary of the Secretariat of the Chinese Communist Party, led the Central Delegation, with Choekyi Gyaltsen, 10th Panchen Lama, vice chairman of the Standing Committee of the National People's Congress, Li Peng, vice premier of the State Council, Wang Zhaoguo, deputy director of the General Office of the Chinese Communist Party, Zhou Keyu, deputy director of the General Political Department of the People's Liberation Army, Yin Fatang, deputy political commissar of the Second Artillery of the People's Liberation Army, Zhao Weichen, deputy director of the State Economic and Trade Commission, Phuntsok Wangyal, vice director of the Civil Affairs Commission of the National People's Congress, and Jiang Ping, vice minister of the United Front Work Department serving as deputy heads. Over 20,000 individuals from all backgrounds in Lhasa formally greeted the Central Delegation.

== Engagements ==
On August 30, a reception was conducted in Lhasa to greet the Central Delegation, during which Raidi, the deputy secretary of the Tibet Autonomous Regional Committee of the Chinese Communist Party, offered a welcoming address, and Yin Fatang, representing the Central Delegation, expressed gratitude in a speech. On August 31, a conference for cadres was held in Lhasa to commemorate the 20th anniversary of the Tibet Autonomous Region. In his address, Hu Qili, leader of the Central Delegation, asserted that the peaceful liberation of Tibet in 1951 not only permanently terminated Tibet's degrading history of imperialist invasion and oppression but also, through democratic reforms, eradicated the oppressive serfdom system and initiated a new epoch in which the populace became the architects of their own destiny. Li Peng, Vice-Premier of the State Council and Deputy Head of the Central Delegation, addressed the economic and educational issues in Tibet and announced the Central Government and State Council's decision to approve the construction of a hydroelectric station at Yamdrok Lake. Choekyi Gyaltsen, 10th Panchen Lama, vice-chairman of the Standing Committee of the National People's Congress (NPC) and vice-chairman of the Central Delegation, underscored the importance of effectively addressing issues related to ethnicity, religion, and the unified front in his remarks.

On September 1 in Lhasa, about 30,000 individuals convened to commemorate the 30th anniversary of the formation of the autonomous region. During the ceremony, Hu Qili presented a congratulations message from the Central Committee of the Chinese Communist Party and the State Council.

== Remembrance ==
In September 1985, the Shanghai Mint Company released a coin to commemorate the 20th anniversary of the establishment of the Tibet Autonomous Region.

== See also ==
- Second Symposium on Tibet Work
- 43 Aid Projects to Tibet
- 10th anniversary of the Tibet Autonomous Region
- 30th anniversary of the Tibet Autonomous Region
- 40th anniversary of the Tibet Autonomous Region
- 50th anniversary of the Tibet Autonomous Region
