= Fourth Symposium on Tibet Work =

The Central Committee of the Chinese Communist Party and the State Council held the Fourth Symposium on Tibet Work (Chinese: 中央第四次西藏工作座谈会) in Beijing from June 25 to 27, 2001.

== Procedure ==
The primary objective of the meeting was to encapsulate the accomplishments and experiences of Tibet's initiatives since the Third Symposium on Tibet Work, evaluate the circumstances and challenges confronting Tibet's endeavors at the onset of the new century, and examine significant issues pertinent to future efforts in Tibet, thereby facilitating the attainment of accelerated development and enduring peace and stability in the region. Jiang Zemin, General Secretary of the Chinese Communist Party, evaluated the accomplishments and significant experiences of the initiatives in Tibet since the Third Symposium on Work in Tibet, assessed the current challenges confronting these efforts, and proposed the guiding principles and primary objectives for future endeavors in Tibet. Premier Zhu Rongji and Chairman Li Peng of the Standing Committee of the National People's Congress discussed the operational deployment in Tibet.

== See also ==
- First Symposium on Tibet Work in 1980
- Second Symposium on Tibet Work in 1984
  - 43 Aid Projects to Tibet
- Third Symposium on Tibet Work in 1994
  - 62 Aid Projects to Tibet
- Fifth Symposium on Tibet Work in 2010
- Sixth Symposium on Tibet Work in 2015
- Seventh Symposium on Tibet Work in 2020
- Forum on the Development of Xizang
