= 62 Aid Projects to Tibet =

Chinese projects in support of Tibet's construction

The 62 Aid Projects to Tibet are the sixty-two projects of the People's Republic of China in support of the construction of Tibet, as determined by the Third Symposium on Tibet Work convened by the Central Government in 1994. These projects involved agriculture, animal husbandry and forestry, transportation, energy, post and telecommunications, and communications, with a cumulative total investment of over RMB 4.86 billion. These projects have been fully completed and put into operation.

== Lists ==
1. Construction of Agricultural Technology Extension System: Aided by the Ministry of Agriculture.
2. Comprehensive Agricultural Development of the Yuqu River in Zuogong County: invested and constructed by the Ministry of Finance.
3. Liberation Canal in Renbu County: invested and constructed by the State Planning Commission and the Ministry of Water Resources.
4. Manla Water Conservancy Hub Project: invested and constructed by the State Planning Commission and the Ministry of Water Resources. This project is the largest, most invested and longest project among the 62 projects.
5. High-quality oilseed rape production and processing: by the Ministry of Agriculture of the People's Republic of China and Gansu Province aid construction.
6. Naidong County oil grain processing plant: built with the aid of Sichuan Province, the Central Government and Sichuan joint investment
7. Oil and grain processing plant in Lhasa: built with the aid of Sichuan Province and jointly invested by the Central Government and Sichuan
8. Northwest Tibet Velvet Goat Base: invested by the Ministry of Agriculture.
  Nagqu cashmere combing plant: invested by the Ministry of Foreign Trade and Economic Cooperation.
9. Linzhi Dongjiu Forestry Development: built with the aid of the Ministry of Forestry of the People's Republic of China, China Development Bank and Xiamen City of Fujian Province.
10. Tibet Border Tea Factory: invested by the Ministry of Agriculture in the construction of tea processing facilities, and invested by the State Planning Commission and Yunnan Province in the construction of a 640-kilowatt power station.
11. Dingqing County Hydropower Station: invested and built by Hainan Province.
12. Baqing County Hydropower Station: built with the aid of Jilin Province.
13. Tsomei County Hydropower Station: Designed by Water Conservancy and Hydroelectricity Surveying and Facilities Research Institute of Jilin Province, constructed by Hubei Water Conservancy Department and provided training.
14. Yanjing Hydropower Station in Mangkang County: built with the aid of Tianjin Municipality and constructed by Sinohydro 14th Engineering Company.
15. Nerong County Hydropower Station: built with the aid of Liaoning Province.
16. Nanyi Hydropower Station in Miling County: invested and constructed by Fujian Province.
17. Woka River Grade I Hydropower Station: built with the aid of China Development Bank.
18. Langjiu Geothermal Power Station: financed by China Development Bank, Tibet Geothermal Development Company undertook the reconstruction of the power station.
19. Lhasa West Suburb Transmission and Substation Project: invested and constructed by China Development Bank.
20. Changdu Power Grid Reconstruction: the Ministry of Electric Power of the People's Republic of China was fully responsible for the construction, and Zigong Power Bureau of Sichuan Provincial Power Bureau was designated as the construction unit.
21. Construction of Chromite Mine in Shankar Mountain: fixed loan from China Development Bank plus self-financing by the enterprise.
22. Shenzha gold mine and ancillary facilities construction: the Ministry of Metallurgy of the People's Republic of China is responsible for the design, and a loan from the People's Bank of China.
23. Shenzha Kegang Hydropower Station: invested by Zhejiang Province to aid the construction, the rest of the state subsidies.
  Zacang Chaka taut magnesium mine: aided and constructed by the Ministry of Chemical Industry of the People's Republic of China.
24. Relocation of Chamdo Cement Plant: constructed with the combined efforts of loan from China Development Bank, appropriation from Tibet Autonomous Region and self-financing.
25. Machala Coal Mine: built with the aid of the Ministry of Coal of the People's Republic of China, and constructed by the Sixth Construction Engineering Agency of Sichuan Coal Mine.
26. Expansion of Tibetan Medicine Factory in Tibet Autonomous Region: built with the aid of Jiangsu Province.
27. Reconstruction of Lagong Highway: aided and constructed by the Ministry of Transportation of the People's Republic of China.
28. Oil pipeline from Golmud Oil Refinery to 101 Oil Depot: constructed by the Ministry of Metallurgy of the People's Republic of China, China National Petroleum Corporation, General Logistics Department of the People's Liberation Army and Golmud City of Qinghai Province.
29. Lhasa Xinhua Bookstore: built with the aid of Henan Province.
30. Renovation of Zhongba-Lazhi section of China-Nepal Highway: invested by the state and constructed by the Second Armed Police Traffic Detachment.
31. Construction of oil storage facilities at Gongga Airport: invested by the State Planning Commission, designed by the China Aviation Oil Design Institute, constructed by the Ninth General Engineering Institute of China Aviation Port Construction, and supervised by the Civil Aviation Southwest Airport Construction Co.
32. Long-distance telephone hub building in the western suburb of Lhasa: built with the assistance of the Ministry of Posts and Telecommunications of the People's Republic of China.
33. Fiber optic cable project from Lhasa to Shigatse: invested by the Ministry of Posts and Telecommunications of the People's Republic of China.
34. 12 terrestrial VSAT stations: invested by the Ministry of Posts and Telecommunications of the People's Republic of China, designed by the Beijing Design Institute of the Ministry of Posts and Telecommunications of the People's Republic of China and constructed by the Post and Telecommunications Administration of Tibet Autonomous Region and the Post and Telecommunications Administration of Sichuan Province.
35. Potala Palace Square: invested and reconstructed by the State Planning Commission.
36. Lhasa Ring Road: built with the aid of the State Planning Commission.
37. Road reconstruction in Zedang Town: jointly invested and constructed by the State Planning Commission, the Ministry of Construction and Hunan Province.
38. Rikaze City Water and Sewerage Project: Aided by Shanghai Municipality, Shanghai Water Supply Company is specifically responsible for the construction.
39. Shiquanhe Town Water and Sewage Project: built with the aid of Shaanxi Province, divided into water supply project and drainage project.
40. Comprehensive Building of Party School and Administrative College of the Autonomous Region: built with the assistance of Hebei Province.
41. Construction of county organs in 37 border and poor counties: invested by the Ministry of Finance of the People's Republic of China.
42. Construction of Border Crossing Points: Aided by the Ministry of Finance, including Zhangmu Crossing Point, Pulan Crossing Point, Yadong Crossing Point and other national first and second level crossing points.
43. Tibet Museum: invested and built with the aid of the State Planning Commission.
44. Township-level solar-powered radio and television receiving stations: built with the aid of the Ministry of Radio, Film and Television of the People's Republic of China, Shenzhen City and Heilongjiang Province.
45. Linzhi Hotel: jointly invested by five star-rated hotels in Guangzhou and constructed by the Tibet Branch of the Third Construction Company of Sichuan Province.
46. Rikaze Second Middle School: jointly invested and built by Shanxi Province and Dalian City.
47. Naidong County Middle School: built with the aid of Anhui Province and Guangxi Zhuang Autonomous Region, and constructed by Shannan Regional Construction Company.
48. Jiali County Secondary School: jointly built by Ningxia Hui Autonomous Region and Xinjiang Uygur Autonomous Region.
49. Gongjue County Secondary School: built with the support of Jiangxi Province, Gongjue County is responsible for organizing and implementing the construction, Sichuan Zibang Third Construction Company and Anyue Yongqing Construction Company.
50. Langxian Middle School and Qunar Middle School: Langxian Middle School was built with the assistance of the Inner Mongolia Autonomous Region. Wrongna Middle School was built with the assistance of the Ningxia Hui Autonomous Region.
51. Reproductive Health Training Center: built with the aid of the State Planning Commission.
52. Infectious Disease Hospital of the Autonomous Region: constructed with the aid of Shanghai Municipality.
53. Inpatient Department of Lhasa Municipal Hospital: Supported by Jiangsu Province.
54. Office Building and Conference Center of the Party Committee and Government of the Autonomous Region: built with the aid of the State Planning Commission.
55. Tibet Building in Beijing: appropriately subsidized by the Central People's Government, Beijing Municipality provided construction land and part of construction funds free of charge and was responsible for the construction.
56. Renovation of Tanghe Hydropower Plant: Aided by Shandong Province.
57. Rehabilitation of Wokatan Tertiary Power Station: Aid construction by Guizhou Province.
58. Renovation of Linzhi Bayi Power Plant: invested by Guangdong Province and constructed by Guangdong Electric Power Bureau and Guangdong Shaoguan Civil Power Equipment Factory.
59. Lhasa Cement Plant Rotary Kiln Rehabilitation
60. Renovation of Changdu Grain and Oil Processing Plant: reconstructed with the aid of Chongqing Municipality.
61. Linzhi County Grain and Oil Processing Plant renovation: aid from the State Economic and Trade Commission.
62. Gongga Grain and Oil Processing Plant: built with the assistance of the Ministry of Domestic Trade of the People's Republic of China and the All-China Federation of Supply and Marketing Cooperatives, and utilized by the Tibet Autonomous Region. The Luozha Cereals and Oil Processing Plant also belongs to the scope of reconstruction assistance.
63. Tibet Agricultural and Animal Husbandry Products Processing and Export Base

== See also ==
- First Symposium on Tibet Work in 1980
- Second Symposium on Tibet Work in 1984
  - 43 Aid Projects to Tibet
- Third Symposium on Tibet Work in 1994
- Fourth Symposium on Tibet Work in 2001
- Fifth Symposium on Tibet Work in 2010
- Sixth Symposium on Tibet Work in 2015
- Seventh Symposium on Tibet Work in 2020
