= Tibet Autonomous Region Archives =

Province-level archives in Tibet, China

Coordinates: 29.65772°N 91.08187°E

The Tibet Autonomous Region Archives (Chinese: 西藏自治区档案局), or TAR Archives, are province-level archives in the Tibet Autonomous Region of China, located on Beijing West Road in Lhasa.

== History ==
In June 1959, the CPC Tibet Work Committee (Chinese: 中国共产党西藏工作委员会) set up the Tibet Cultural Relics, Monuments, Documents and Archives Management Committee, with the Documents and Archives Section under it. In 1963, the Preparatory Office of the TAR Archives was set up. In 1965, the TAR Archives Bureau (TAR Archives) was established. In 1972, the TAR Archives Section was set up. In 1975, the TAR Archives Bureau and TAR Archives were under one brand, i.e., "TAR Archives Bureau", with both units having one set of personnel. In 1981, the Bureau and the Archives were separated, and the TAR Historical Archives was established. In 1987, the TAR Historical Archives was renamed the TAR Archives. On July 7, 1994, the Bureau and the Archives were merged, and the TAR Archives Bureau and the TAR Archives became a single set of personnel. Tibet Autonomous Region Archives became a set of people and two brands, and the Tibet Autonomous Region Archives was upgraded to a sub-territorial unit, an institution directly under the TAR Party Committee and the TAR People's Government, and under the leadership of the General Office of the TAR Party Committee.

The name of the museum in Chinese and Tibetan were respectively inscribed by Deng Xiaoping and Ngapo-Ngawang Jigme. On July 25, 1990, Jiang Zemin, the General Secretary of the CPC Central Committee, visited the museum and wrote the inscription "The excellent history and culture of the Tibetan people is an important part of the cultural treasury of the Chinese nation".

== Collections ==
The museum has archives from the Yuan Dynasty, the Ming Dynasty, the Qing Dynasty, the Republic of China and 1950s.

The original of the Agreement between the Central People's Government and the Local Government of Tibet on Measures for the Peaceful Liberation of Tibet is in the Tibet Autonomous Region Archives.

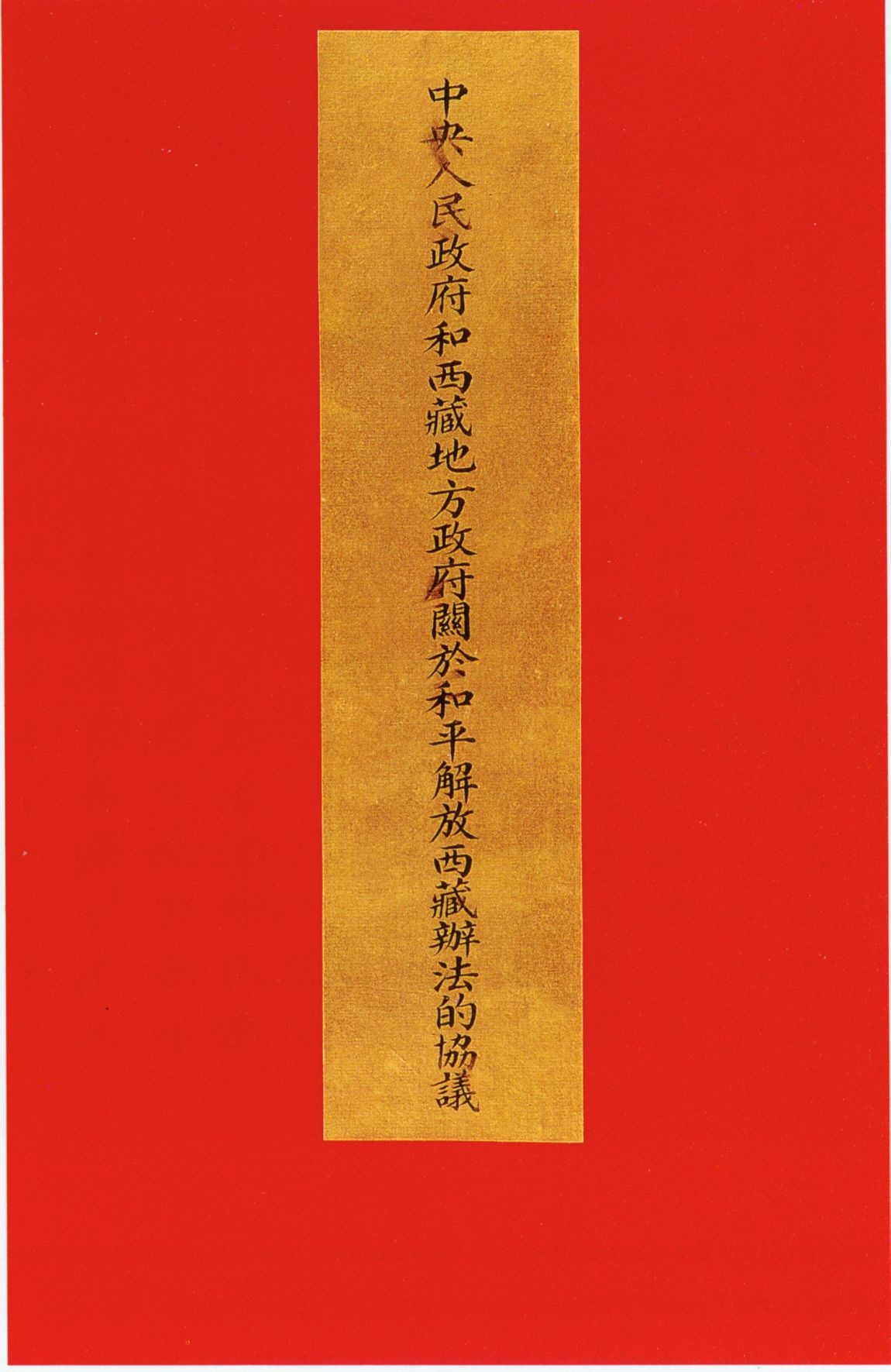
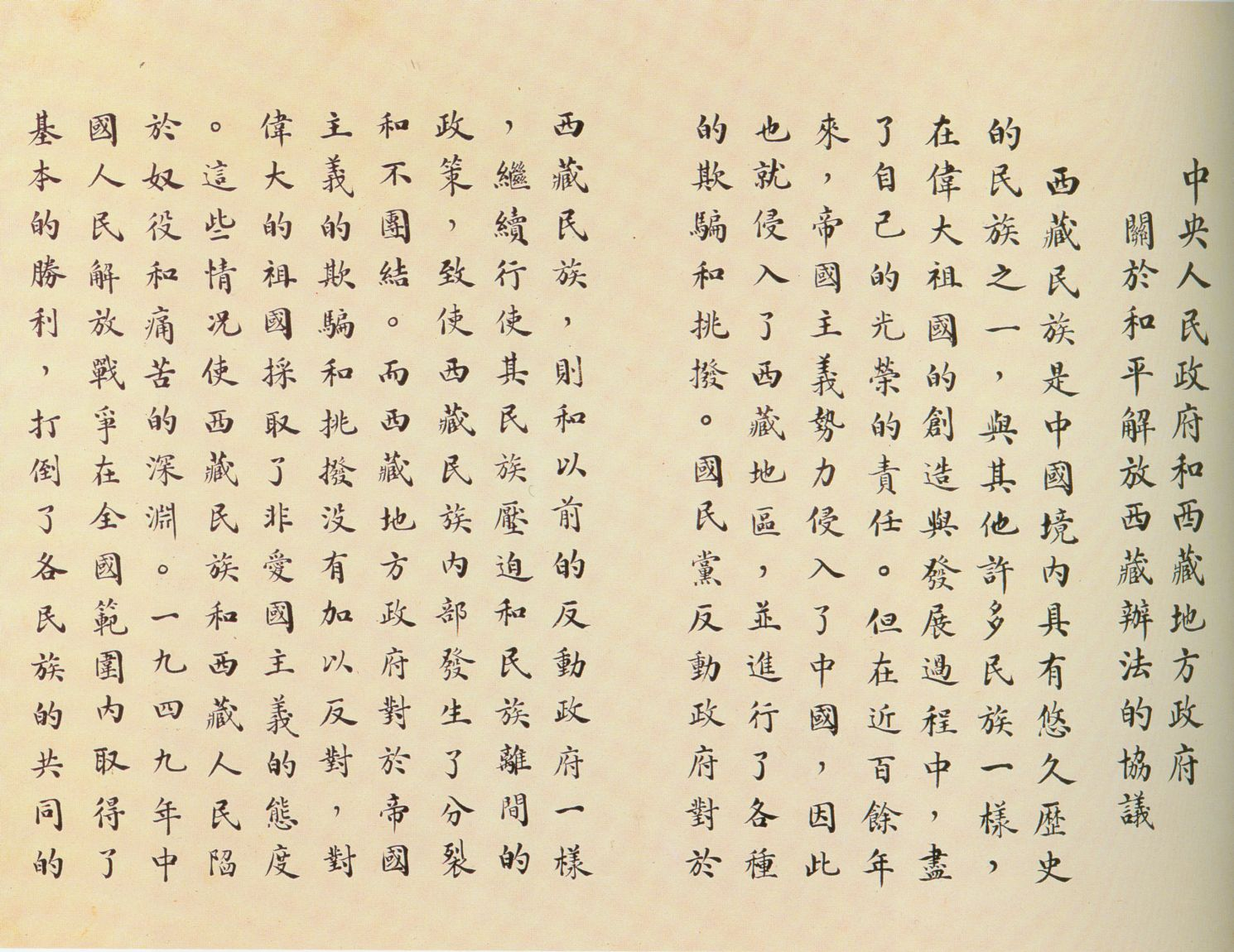
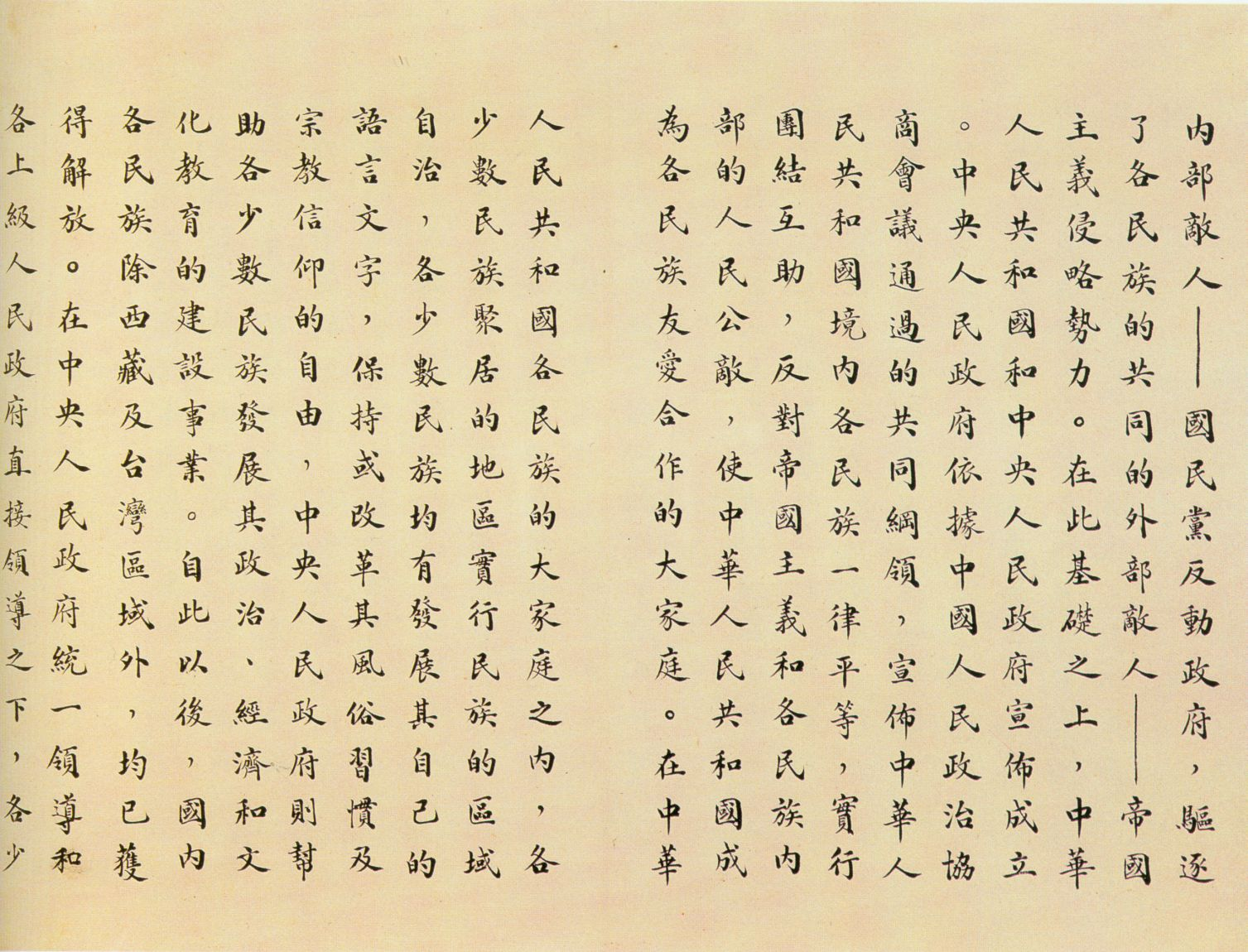
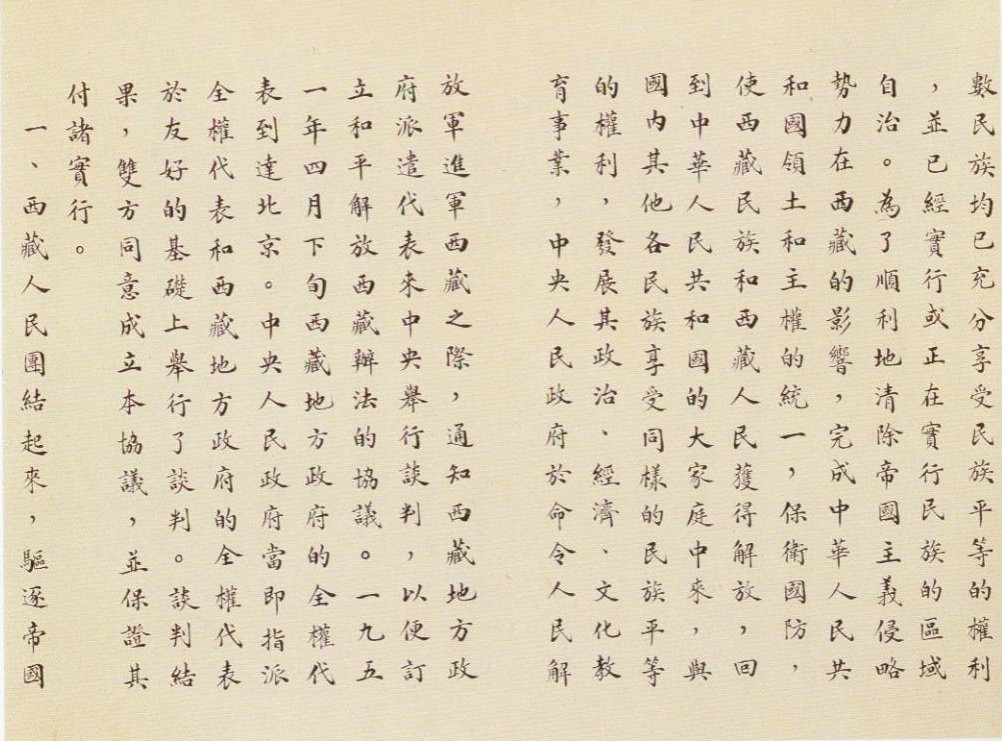
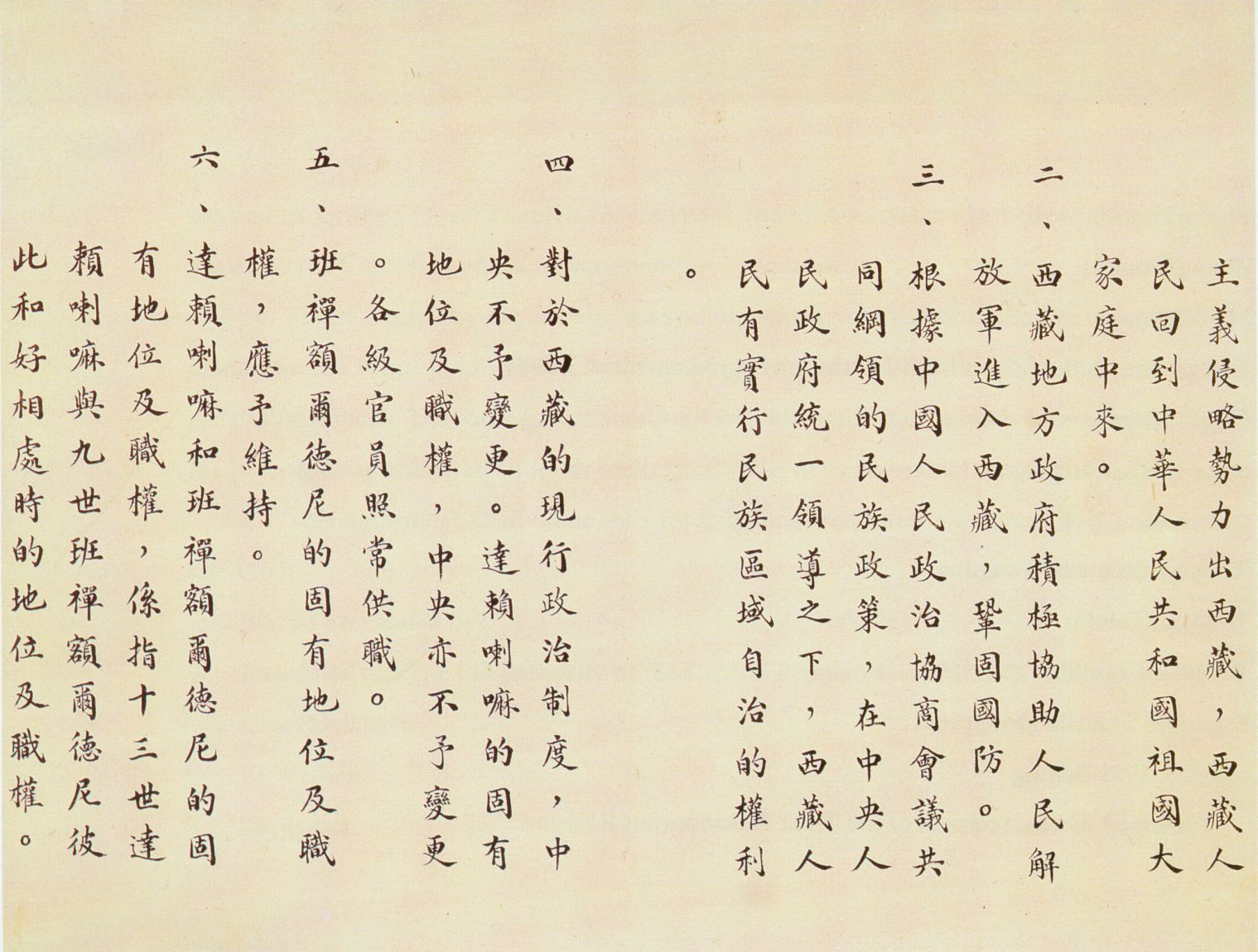
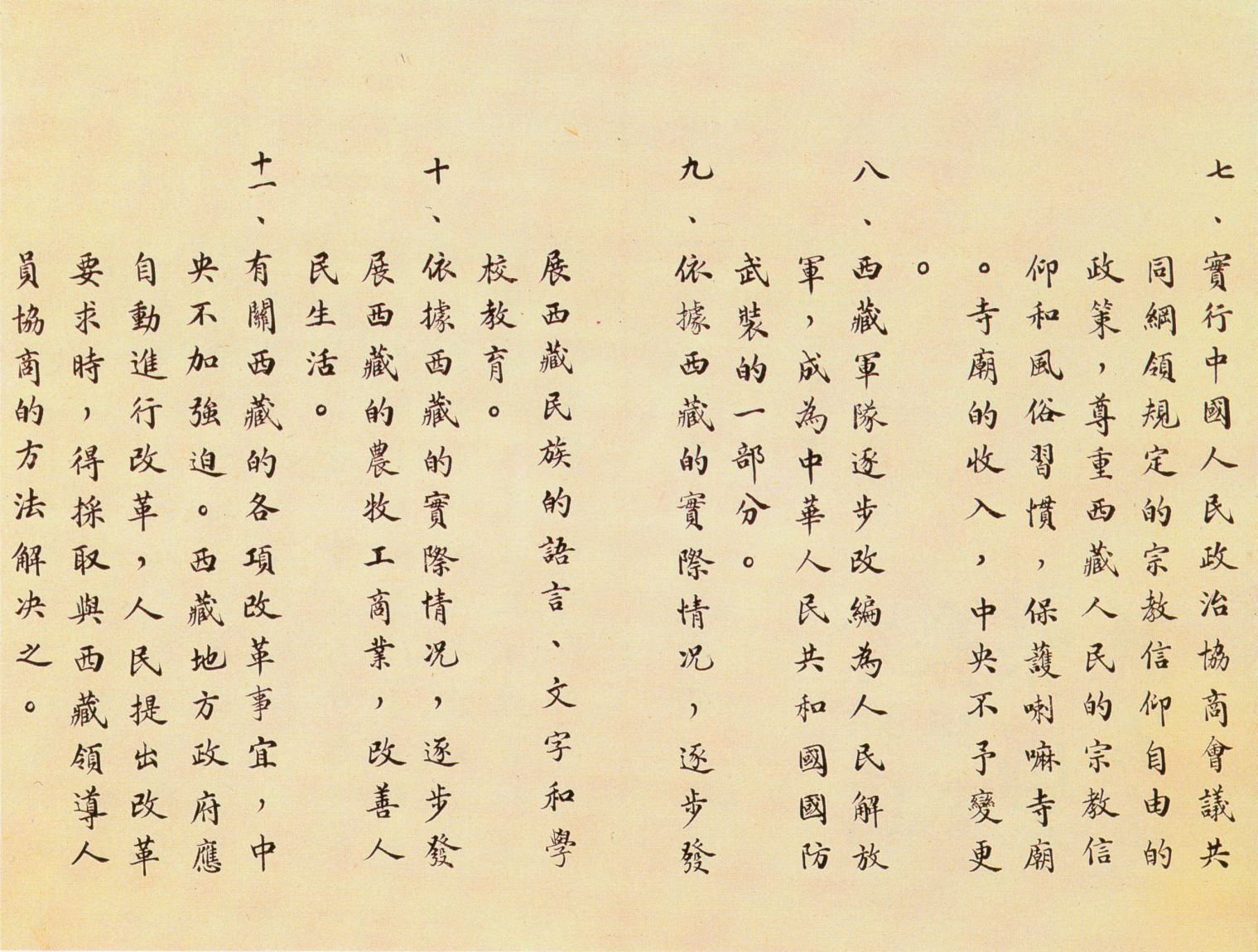
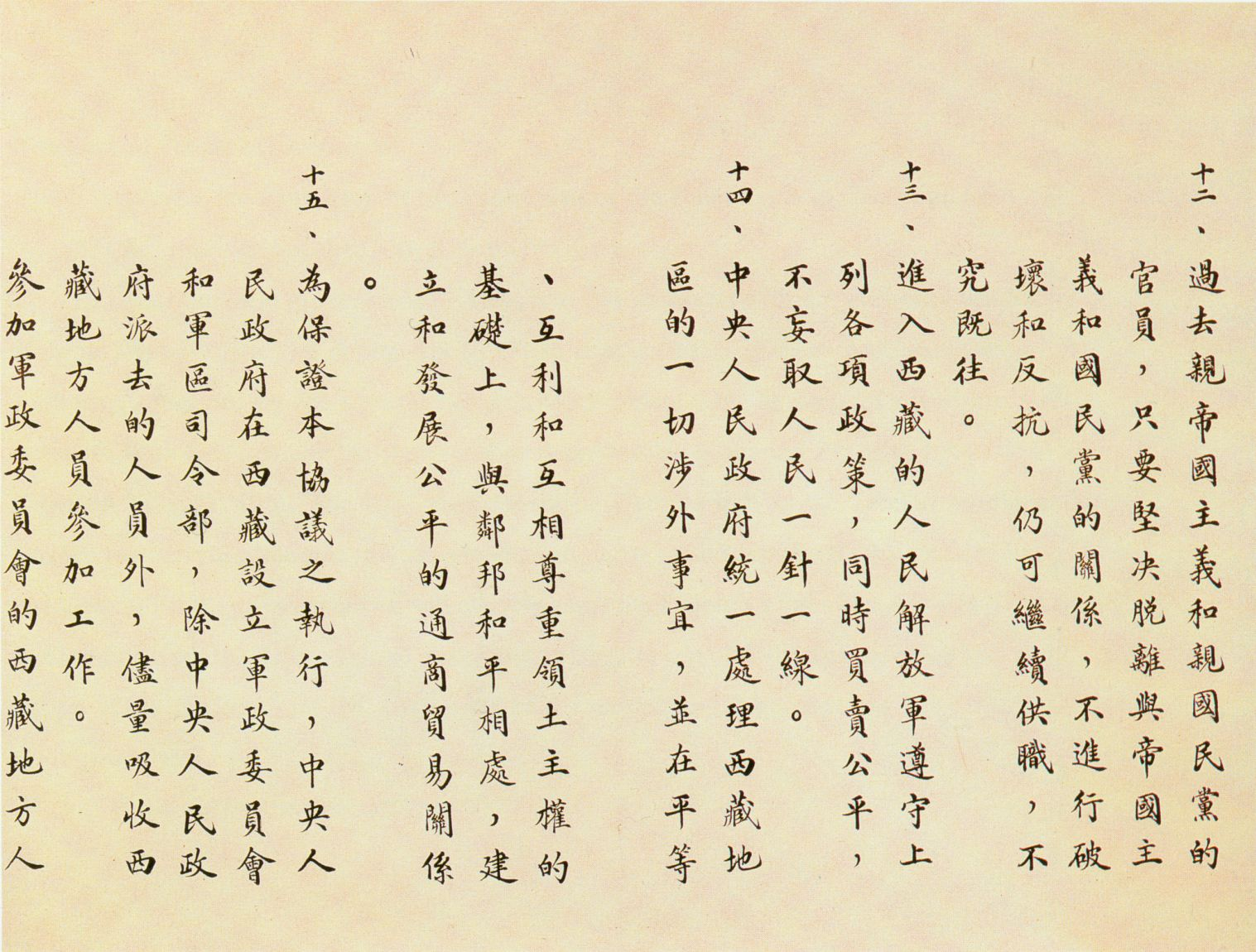
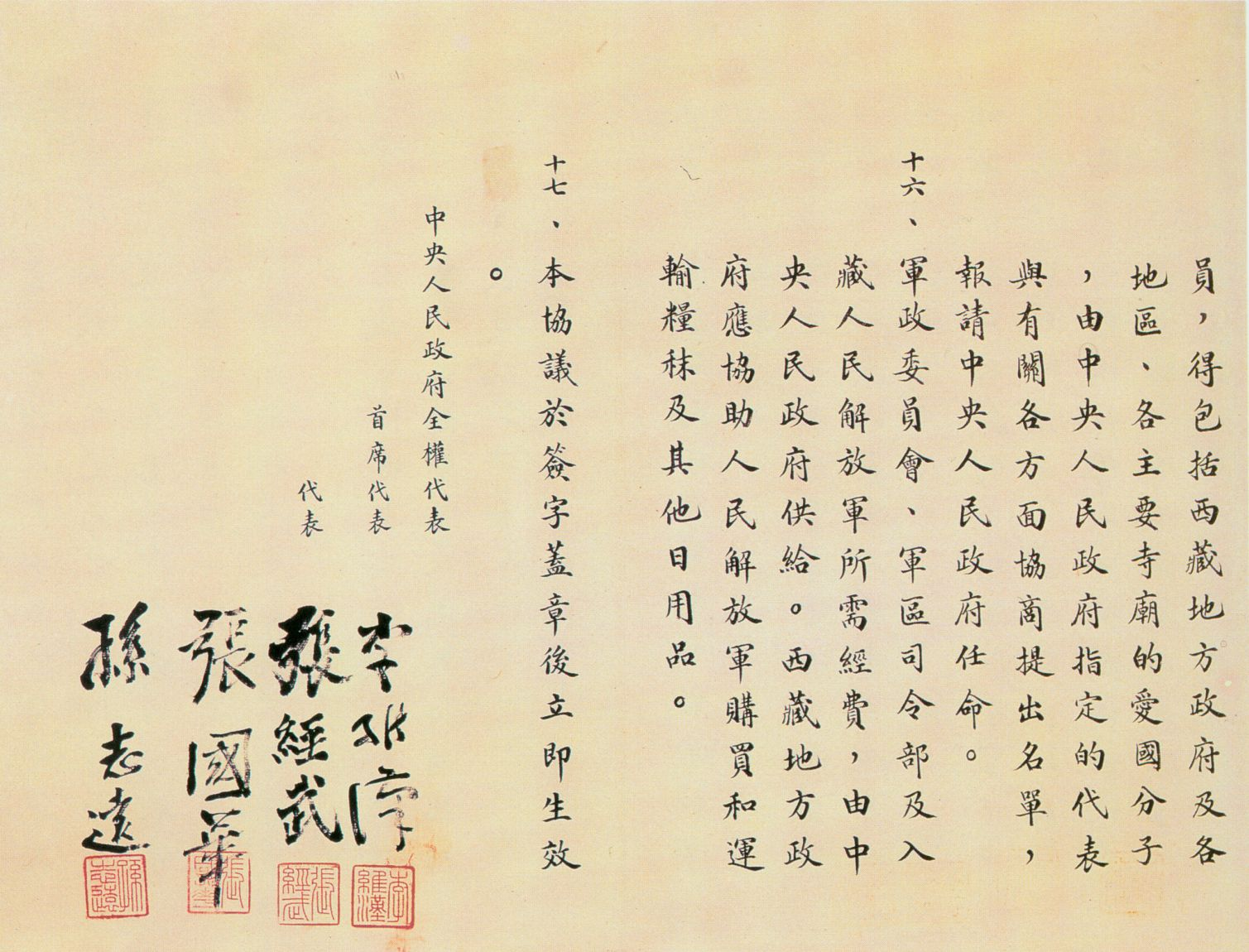
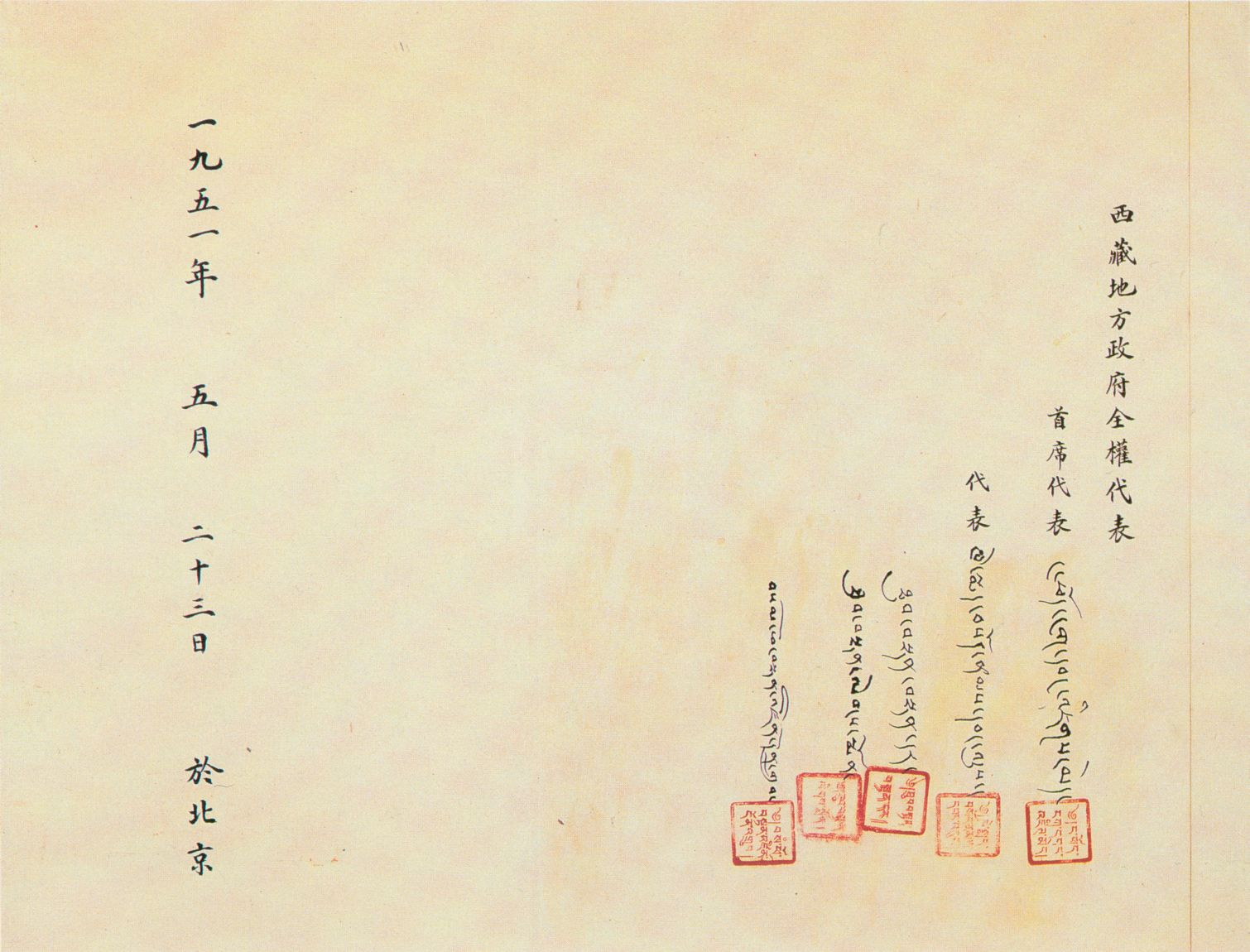
Seventeen Point Agreement (Han)
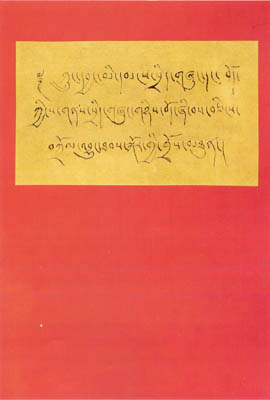
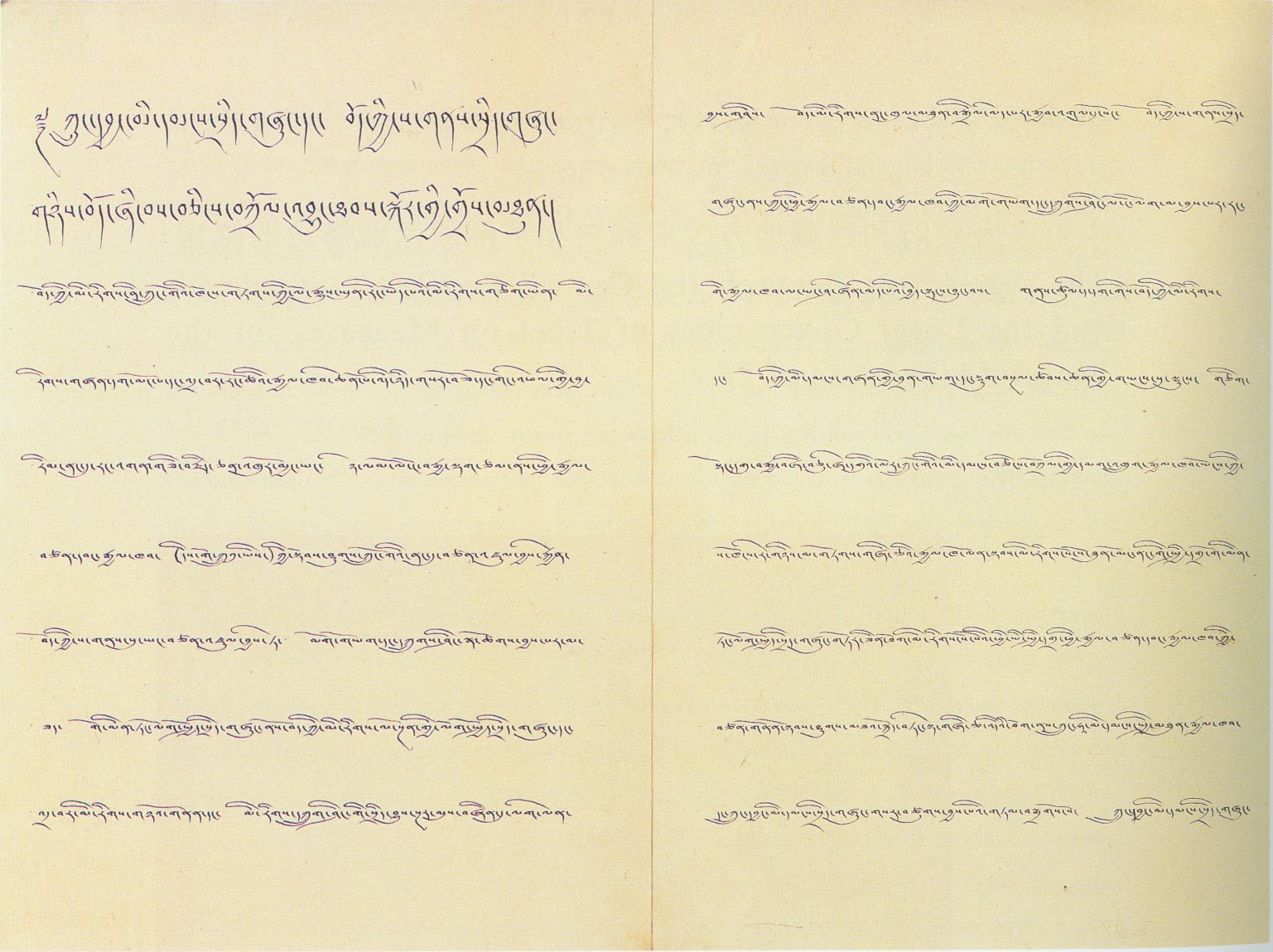
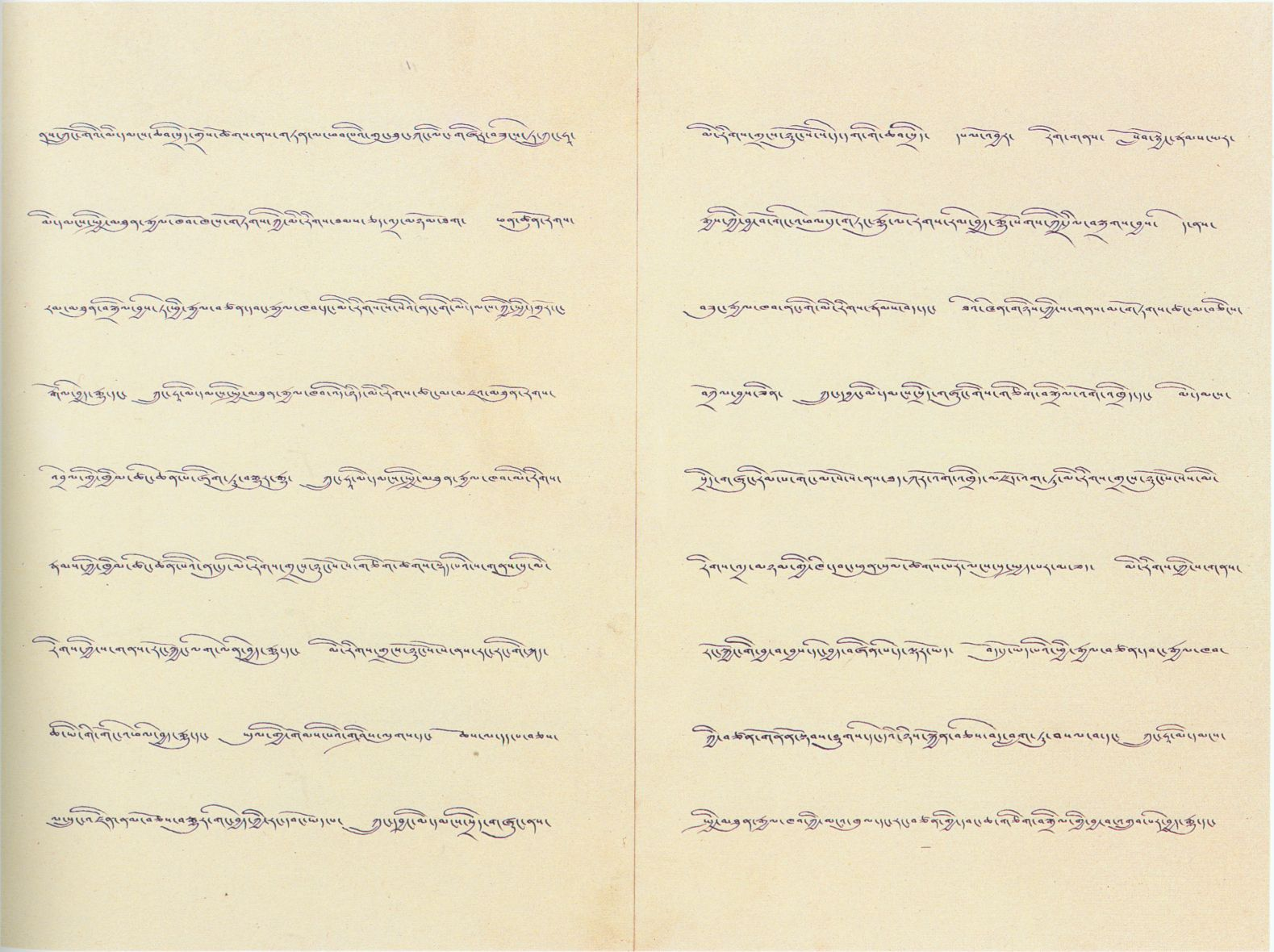
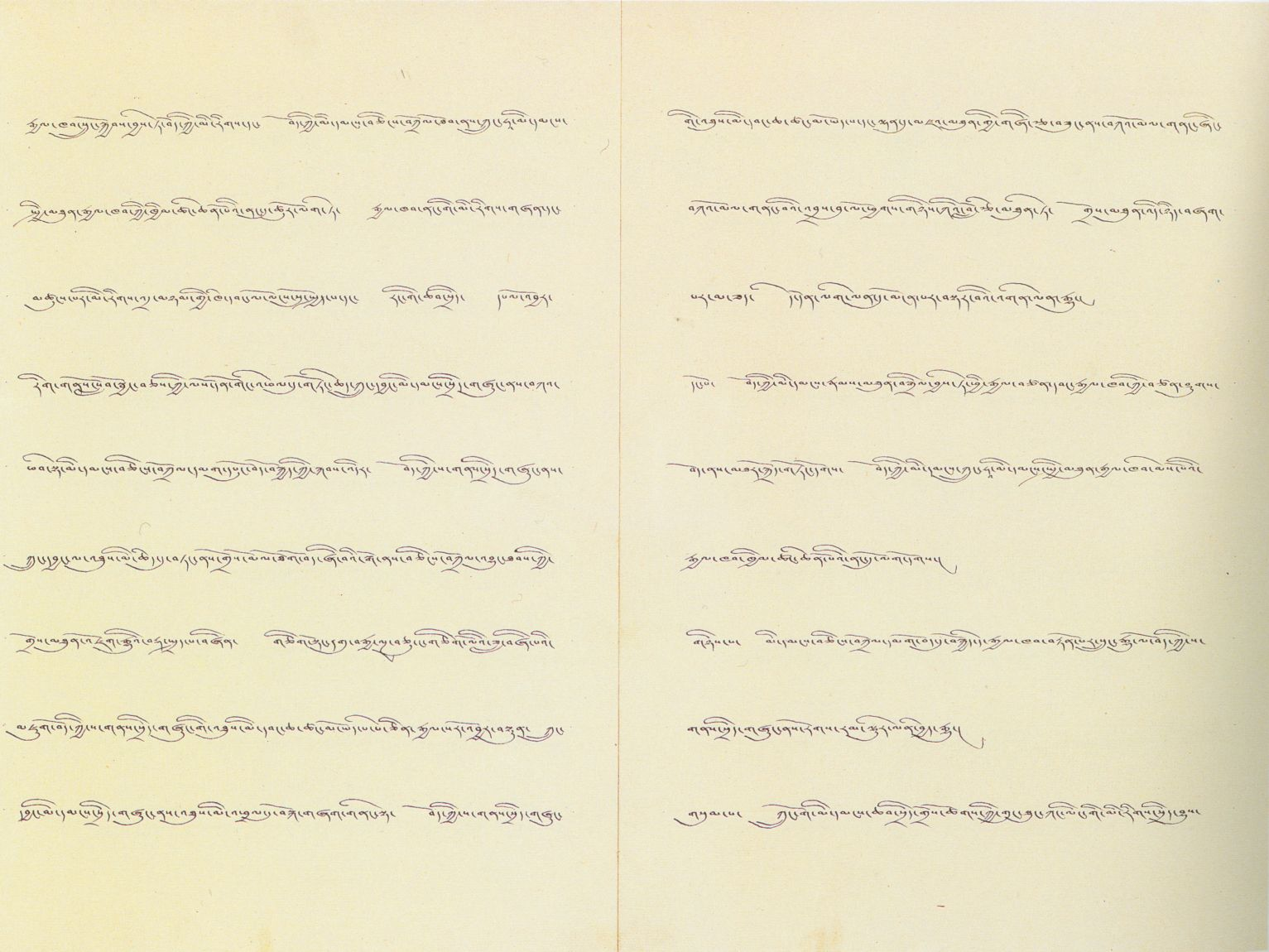
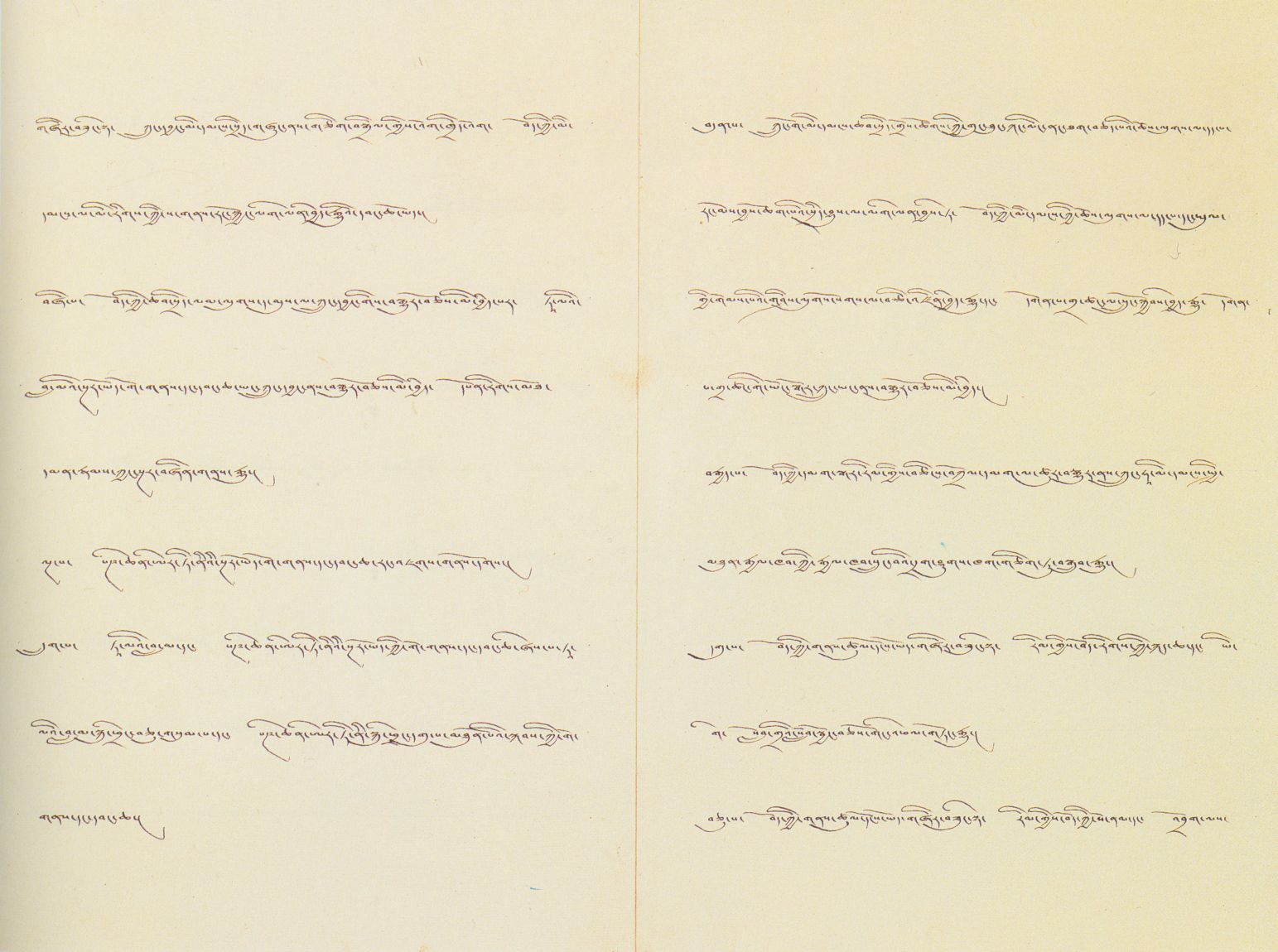
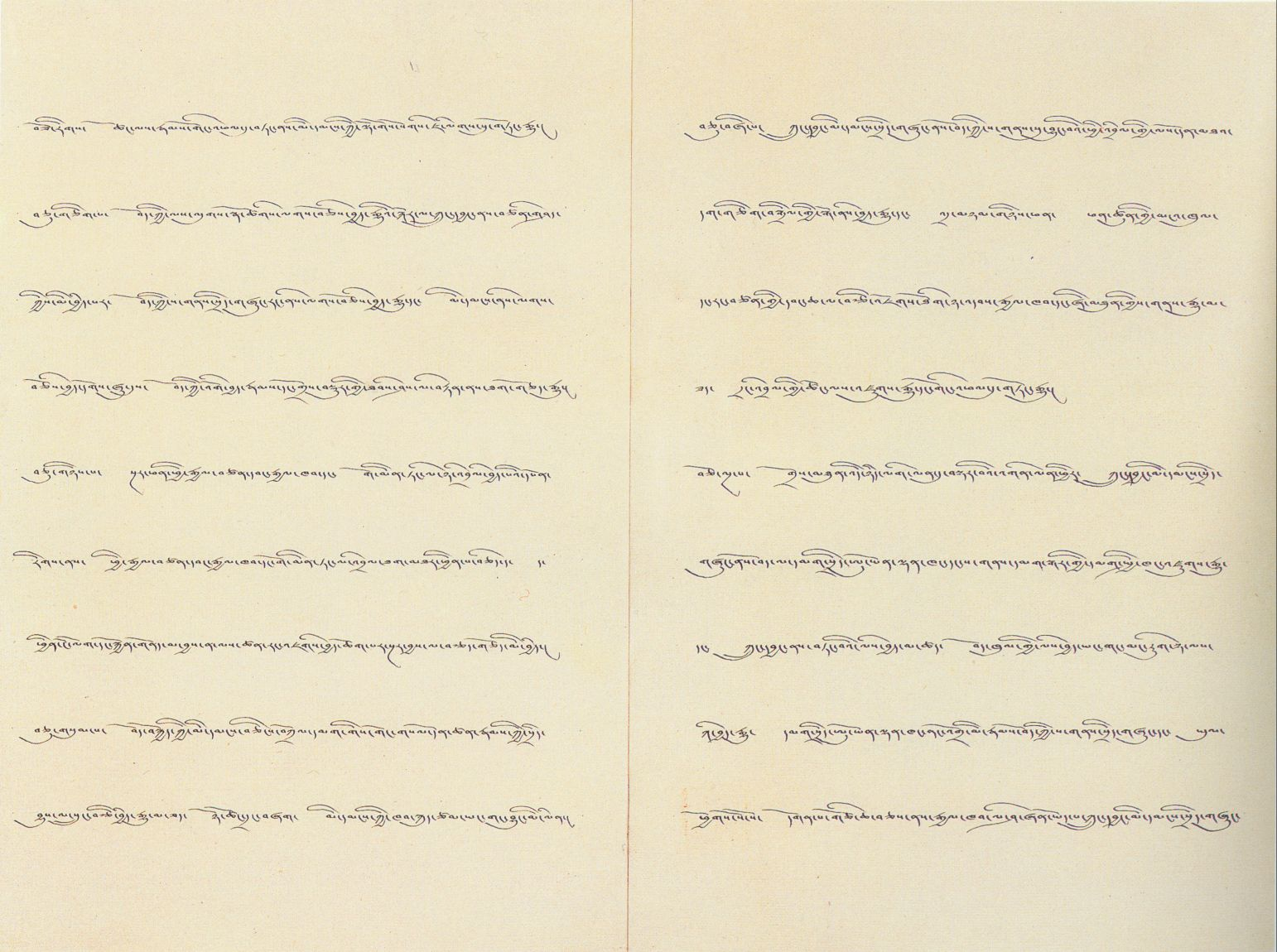
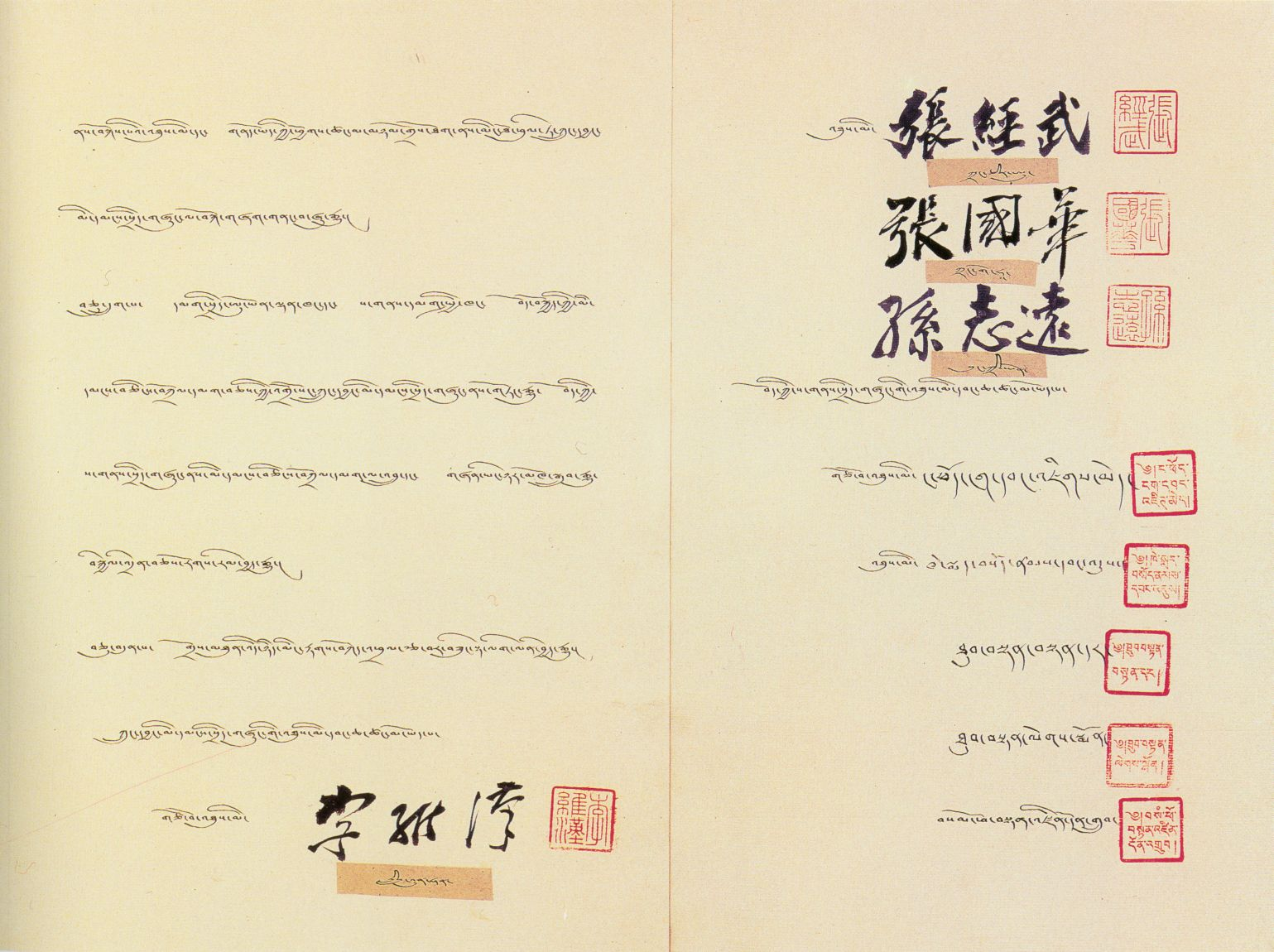
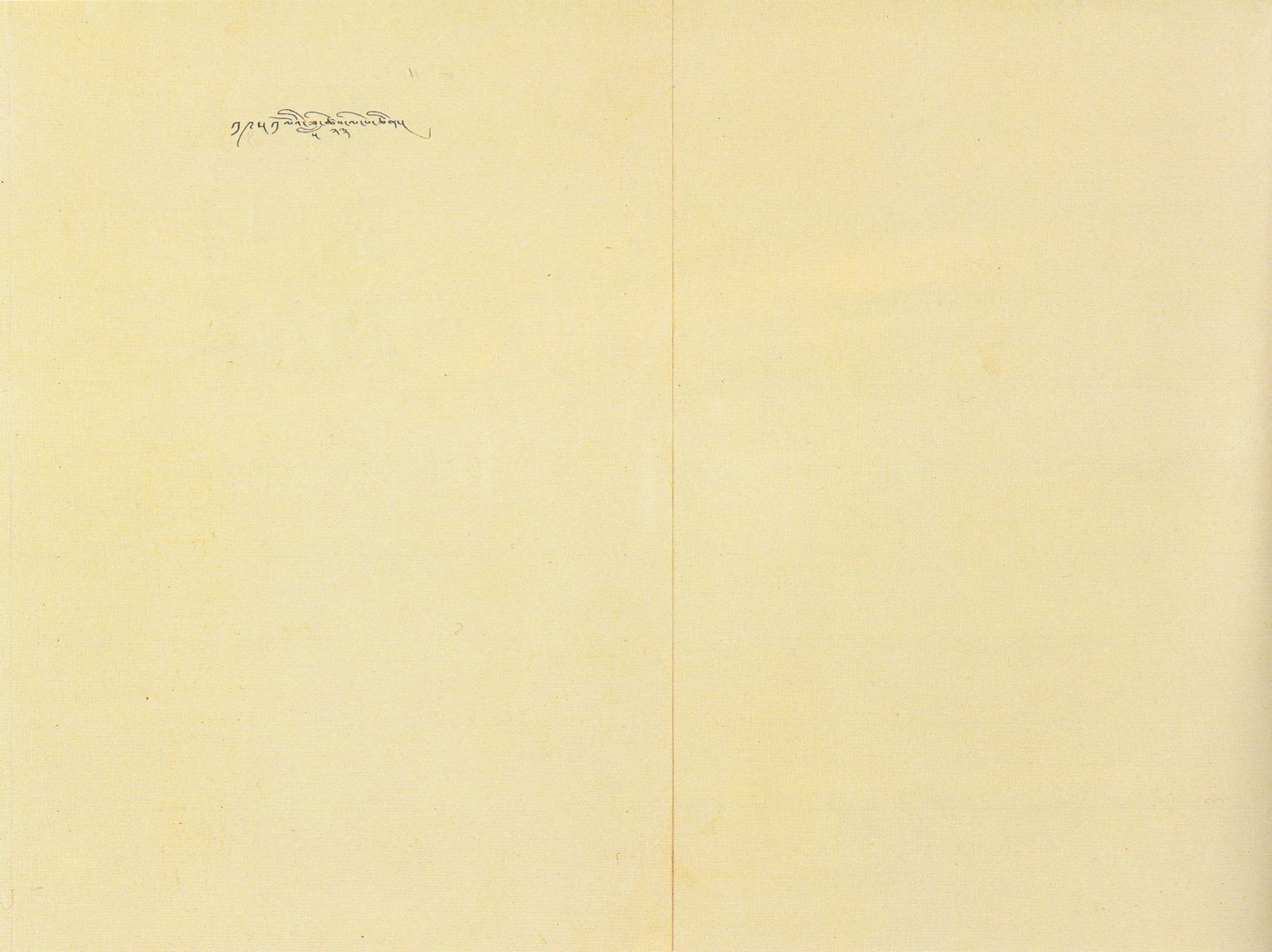
Seventeen Point Agreement (Tibetan)
