= Fifth Symposium on Tibet Work =

The Fifth Symposium on Tibet Work (Chinese: 中央第五次西藏工作座谈会) of the Central Government occurred from January 18 to 20, 2010, in Beijing. Hu Jintao, General Secretary of the Chinese Communist Party, chaired the meeting.

== Process ==
The Fifth Central Committee Symposium on Tibet Work convened in Beijing, with attendance from Hu Jintao, Wu Bangguo, Wen Jiabao, Jia Qinglin, Li Changchun, Xi Jinping, Li Keqiang, and He Guoqiang. The meeting encapsulated the accomplishments and experiences related to Tibet's development and stability, assessed the current circumstances and challenges confronting Tibet's initiatives, delineated the guiding ideology, primary objectives, and operational mandates necessary for effective governance in Tibet at that juncture, and formulated a strategic plan to propel Tibet towards accelerated development and enduring peace and stability.

The summit established a thorough plan to expedite the economic and social development of Tibetan regions in Sichuan, Yunnan, Gansu, and Qinghai Provinces.

== See also ==
- First Symposium on Tibet Work in 1980
- Second Symposium on Tibet Work in 1984
  - 43 Aid Projects to Tibet
- Third Symposium on Tibet Work in 1994
  - 62 Aid Projects to Tibet
- Fourth Symposium on Tibet Work in 2001
- Sixth Symposium on Tibet Work in 2015
- Seventh Symposium on Tibet Work in 2020
- Forum on the Development of Xizang
