= 43 Aid Projects to Tibet =

1984 architecture project in China

The 43 Aid Projects to Tibet (Chinese: 43项援藏工程), also known as the Key Projects, were identified at the Second Symposium on Tibet Work convened by the Chinese Central Government in 1984. These 43 projects, carried out by nine provinces and municipalities (Beijing, Shanghai, Tianjin, Jiangsu, Zhejiang, Fujian, Shandong, Sichuan, and Guangdong), were designed to help develop Tibet. They served as a celebratory project for the 20th anniversary of the founding of the Tibet Autonomous Region, with a total investment of 480 million yuan. These projects have been fully completed and put into use.

== List ==
- Lhasa Hotel: located in Lhasa, invested and built by Jiangsu Province.
- Lhasa Airport Hotel: located in Lhasa and invested by Jiangsu Province.
- Lhasa Youth Activity Center: located in Lhasa, invested and supported by Jiangsu Province.
- Lhasa Passenger Station: located in Lhasa, invested and supported by Jiangsu Province.
- Inpatient Building of Tibet Autonomous Region Hospital: located in Lhasa, invested and supported by Jiangsu Province.
- Tibet Stadium: located in Lhasa, invested and supported by Zhejiang Province.
- Expansion of Tibet University: located in Lhasa, invested and supported by Zhejiang Province.
- Lhasa Feed Processing Plant: located in Lhasa and invested by Zhejiang Province.
- Tibet Hotel: located in Lhasa, invested and supported by Fujian Province.
- Lhasa Water and Sewerage Project: located in Lhasa, invested and supported by Sichuan Province.
- Yangbajing Geothermal Wool Washing Plant: located in Lhasa, invested by Beijing Municipality.
- Expansion of Yangbajing Geothermal Power Station and Power Transmission and Transformation Project: located in Lhasa, invested and supported by Southwest Electricity Administration.
- Lhasa Thermal Power Plant Renovation and Heat Supply Project: located in Lhasa, invested by the Ministry of Water Resources and Electricity of the People's Republic of China and Beijing Municipality.
- Tibet Autonomous Region Mass Art Center: located in Lhasa, invested by Tianjin Municipality.
- Lhasa Theater: located in Lhasa and invested by Tianjin Municipality
- Lhasa Gray Sand Brick Factory: located in Lhasa, invested and supported by Sichuan Province.
- Qushui Sefu Hydropower Station: located in Lhasa, invested and supported by Sichuan Province and the Ministry of Water Resources and Electric Power of the People's Republic of China.
- Lhasa TV Teaching Building: located in Lhasa, invested by Zhejiang Province, aid construction
- Yangbajing to Lhasa Heat Supply Project: located in Lhasa, invested by the Ministry of Petroleum Industry of the People's Republic of China.
- Granite Processing Plant: located in Lhasa, invested and supported by Fujian Province.
- Qinghai-Tibet Highway Supporting Project: located in Tibet Autonomous Region, invested and supported by Sichuan Province.
- New Building Materials and Inflatable Houses: located in the Tibet Autonomous Region, invested and supported by the State Building Materials Industry Bureau of the People's Republic of China and Shanghai Municipality.
- Solar Stove: located in Tibet Autonomous Region, invested and supported by Beijing Municipality.
- Shigatse Hotel: located in Shigatse City, invested and supported by Shandong Province.
- Shigatse Department Store: located in Shigatse City, invested by Shandong Province.
- Shigatse Mass Art Center: located in Shigatse City, invested and supported by Shandong Province.
- Shigatse Solar Energy Experimental Station: located in Shigatse City, designed and installed by Beijing and civil engineering by Shandong Province.
- Shigatse Hospital Outpatient Building: located in Shigatse City, invested and supported by Shandong Province.
- Gyangtse Hotel: located in Shigatse City, invested and built by Shandong Province
- Chamdo Hotel: located in Chamdo City, invested by Sichuan Province.
- Chamdo Wood Processing Factory: located in Chamdo City, invested by Sichuan Province.
- Chamdo Mass Art Center: located in Chamdo City, invested and supported by Sichuan Province.
- Linzhi Wool Spinning Factory: located in Linzhi City, invested by Shanghai Municipality.
- Inpatient Department of Nagqu Hospital: located in Nagqu, invested and supported by Tianjin.
- Nagqu Wind Energy Experimental Station: located in Nagqu area, invested by Tianjin Municipality.
- Nagqu Mass Art Center: located in Nagqu district, invested and supported by Tianjin.
- Nagqu Hotel: located in Nagqu district, invested and supported by Tianjin.
- Zedang Hospital Outpatient Building: located in Shannan area, invested and supported by Guangdong Province.
- Zedang Mass Art Center: located in Shannan area, invested and supported by Guangdong Province.
- Zedang Hotel: located in Shannan area, invested and supported by Guangdong Province.
- Ali Mass Art Center: located in Ali area, invested and supported by Jiangsu Province.
- Ali Solar Heating Building: located in Ali Prefecture, invested and supported by Jiangsu Province.
- Ali Guest House: located in Ali district, invested and supported by Jiangsu Province.

== See also ==
- 62 Aid Projects to Tibet
- First Symposium on Tibet Work
- Third Symposium on Tibet Work
- 20th anniversary of the Tibet Autonomous Region
