= Lhasa Racecourse =

Racecourse in Lhasa, Tibet, China

Coordinates: 29.6799°N 91.1293°E

The Lhasa Racecourse (拉萨赛马场) is a racecourse located in Lhasa, Tibet Autonomous Region, China, designed for spectators to enjoy the traditional Tibetan sport of horse racing.

== History ==
Built in 1990, the racecourse is located on Zaki Middle Road in Lhasa, not far from the Tibet Gymnasium, and close to the Lhasa Sports School and Cisongtang Park.

Horse racing in Lhasa is a significant event, managed on the third day of the Lunar New Year in the Tibetan calendar. Thousands of Lhasa citizens and farmers in the outskirts of the city, gathered in the Lhasa racecourse, to watch the annual horse race show. Horse racing is one of the favorite athletic entertainment of Tibetans in the time of the year, family and friends feasts.
