= Ernesto Barba =

Ernesto Barba was an Italian hotelier whose career was split between corporate positions in the international hospitality industry, and the entrepreneurial years he spent as a self-employed marketing guru and hotel general-manager-for-hire.

He was born in 1935. He died in Livorno, Italy on April 27, 1994.

Barba was a maverick hospitality executive whose career was sometimes overshadowed by the fame of his younger brother, Eugenio Barba, the well-known Italian theater producer. But Ernesto was a colorful figure in his own right, and had a long career in and out of the traditional halls of the corporate hotel industry. He was a long time Hilton executive, but in the mid-1970s was more or less exiled by them in part because of his sometimes outrageous ideas for promoting their hotels. He is reported to have suggested opening vegetarian restaurants in some Hilton hotels before the idea became less sensationalistic. His last position within Hilton was as general manager of the Taipei Hilton.

Thereafter, he became a sort of freelance hotel promoter and general manager, very active in Spain and Asia. Among his clients were the twin Soto Grande hotels on the Mediterranean Sea, along the Costa del Sol. Barba was recruited to reopen the two properties for commercial business after they lay empty following the death of Francisco Franco, the Spanish leader, who had used the hotels as his personal retreat for many years. Barba then supervised the launch of the Ritz Taipei, and was later retained as the general manager of the Shangrila Hotel which soon became the Sheraton Taipei.

He had some distractions, however, left over from the defeat of Italian fascism at the end of World War II, and in the 1970s he became a senior follower of the Indian spiritual group called the Ananda Marga, whose leader Prabhat Ranjan Sarkar was unjustly imprisoned with a false accusation (and then later cleared of charges). Barba trained a large group of young members in the art of vegetarian cooking. Barba thus first opened a cooking school and vegetarian restaurant, called Alfalfa, at the Soto Grande Hotels in 1978.

Barba's promotion skills were superb and, had he spoken fluent English, they would no doubt have been even more impressive. However he didn't, and as a result, he hired western, native English speaking marketing partners to help bring his client properties to the attention of western, English speaking, travelers. Among these was Michael Adams, an American graphic designer and writer. Barba recruited other international talent as well, and some of those individuals went on to larger hospitality careers, including Dorian Landers, Barba's food-and-beverage-manager-of-choice, who is the founder and CEO of the Malaysia-based hospitality development and consulting firm Hostasia Co. Dorian Landers, true to Barba's stylishness for flamboyance also worked with Bill Bensley to develop some of the best luxury hotels in Asia. Also in Barba's employ at one time was Louis Ercout, an executive chef who eventually founded Prospections Group, a leading hotel executive recruitment agency in Santa Monica, CA.

Barba rightfully understood that creating a buzz of fashion and pop culture could generate meaningful free publicity for a hotel property, and he was therefore always organizing fashion shows and other events to get attention in the local press. When the budget permitted, he went higher on the pop ladder to attract news-worthy personalities to his hotels. In this spirit, he retained Japanese pop artist Tadanori Yokoo to design the interiors of one important restaurant in the Ritz Taipei.

As a testament to his persuasive promotion skills, Barba managed to coax Jeanne Moreau, the French actress/icon to come, free of charge, to the opening ceremony of the Soto Grande Hotels in 1978. Later, in Taipei, he spoke on the phone with Gina Lollobrigida, attempting to lore her to the opening of the Ritz Taipei Hotel, one of the top properties in his string of successful launches. For whatever reason, that fell through, but he had a back-up plan. He easily got Anne Parillaud, the young “Brooke Shields” of Paris (who later won the French Oscar for her lead role in La Femme Nikita) to come instead. At the time, she was 19 and was considered the new Brigitte Bardot.

Although he successfully launched perhaps half a dozen privately owned hotel properties, he had a very strong management style, and sometimes introduced his personal beliefs into the public arena of a hotel. A case in point. He had a private booth reserved for his meals in one restaurant of the Shangrila Hotel (soon to be the Sheraton Taipei). It was in the Pizza Pub there, and he took his vegetarian meals in that booth. But on the wall of the booth he displayed a portrait of Benito Mussolini, and this was in 1981. When he was not using it, the booth was open for regular diners in the restaurant, and the portrait was a source of some concern among some of the hotel's guests.

In 1990, Barba, true to his spirit of adventure went to manage the infamous Holiday Inn In Lhasa (Tibet); one of his last ventures. His flamboyant and controversial management of the hotel is a source of humor in the top-selling book on Tibet; The Hotel on the Roof of the World.

Barba worked as a hotel promoter, managing several properties. He died in 1994, reportedly from a heart attack. His brother, Eugenio Barba, is still alive.
