= Tibetan People's Hall =

Coordinates: 29.65765°N 91.09785°E

The Tibetan People's Hall (Chinese: 西藏人民会堂), located at 16 Minzuzhong Road, Lhasa, Tibet Autonomous Region, China, is a large-scale theater and conference center in Lhasa.

== History ==
Formerly known as the Lhasa Theater (Chinese: 拉萨剧院), the building was one of the 43 Aid Projects to Tibet, built with the assistance of Tianjin Municipality. Construction began in July 1984, and in August 1985, the building was delivered. The building is located across the street from the Lhasa Hotel. Inside the building there are two parts: the theater and the conference center.
