= Garu Nunnery =

Tibetan Buddhist hermitage near Lhasa, Tibet, China

- Location within Tibet

Religion
- Affiliation: Tibetan Buddhism

Location
- Location: Lhasa Prefecture, Tibet, China
- Country: China
- Interactive map of Garu Nunnery
- Coordinates: 29°43′13″N 91°06′12″E

Garu Nunnery is a historical hermitage, belonging to Sera Monastery. It is located north of Lhasa, Lhasa Prefecture, in the Tibet region of China. The nunnery has an ancient history traced to Padmasambhava (Pha dam pa sangs rgyas), the Indian Buddhist preceptor, who visited this location. He not only named the place as "Garu" but also ordained that it shall be a "Nunnery" not a monastery of monks on the basis of prophetic visions he had during his visit to the place. In the late 1980s and early 1990s, some nuns from the monasteries have made publicized demonstrations for Tibetan independence. Many of the protesting nuns were arrested, incarcerated, brutally handled and released only after protracted detention.

== Etymology ==
The name 'Gar' is derived from the word ‘gar’ in Tibetan language which means: “dance”. Padmasambhava, the Indian Buddhist Guru on a visit to this location saw Dakinis dancing here and therefore called the place as "Garu".

== Geography ==
Garu Nunnery is at the western end of the Nyang bran valley. Garu gorge as such is in a remote location but scenic. The nunnery is below the rocky hills, close to a stream and the land below is a kind of meadow, which is used as pasture land for grazing the large herd of cattle (yaks) maintained by the nuns. From the location of the nunnery, which faces south, the Potala Palace and Lhasa (the capital of Tibet) provide a picturesque view. Traditionally, the nuns of the hermitage, habituated to identifying each place with some religious significance, had given names to the hills and peaks surrounding the nunnery; the peak to the north-west was called the Palace of Cakrasamvara (Bde mchog gi pho brang), three rock outcrops near the nunnery were identified as ‘Three Protectors’ (Rigs gsum mgon po); a cliff-face on a northwest hill was named the Mirror of Vajrabhairava (Jigs byed kyi me long) and a peak to the north-east was titled Soul-Mountain of Mañjuśrī (Jam dpal dbyangs kyi bla ri).

Another version of the naming of the mountains, which is more elaborate than the version provided by the nuns, is a manifest of religious names given to the topographic setting of the nunnery and the perceived signals they emit. The mountain behind the nunnery is known as “the Soul-Mountain of Tara (Tārā’i bla ri), a right turning conch shape is identified on a rock face close to the nunnery, and the western hill is identified as “the Soul-Mountain of Manjusri” (’Jam dpal dbyangs kyi bla ri). A “storehouse of sindhura” that gives out sindhura (scented red ochre powder), particularly on holy days has been identified. The shape of a rock face is perceived as a self-risen Vajrabhairava. Blowing of a white conch shell is heard from a particular mountain on some days. Guhyasamaja is the name given to a particular grouping of mountain rock faces and meadows. The rock formations to the north-east are known as “the Soul-Mountain of the Arhats” (Gnas brtan bla ri). The hills on the east are identified as “the Parasol” (Gdugs pa’i bla ri) or as “Mañjuśrī Peak” (’Jam dpal bla ri).

The nunnery is located amidst a forest area with wildlife (not deterred by the humans) which is also rich in medicinal plants. Tibetan physicians from Lhasa visit the place to collect herbs, which are ingredients for Tibetan medicine. Students accompany the physicians to learn the art of finding the correct medicinal plants.

== History ==
The history of the Nunnery could be related to two distinct periods; the first is the period before the Cultural Revolution when the monasteries were in a state of high religious preservation and the second is the post 1959 Cultural Revolution and revolts that ushered hegemonic Chinese rule in Tibet, when most of the Buddhist hermitages underwent a cataclysmic change.

Padamsambhava visited this place in the 11th century, during his sojourn around Tibet propagating the Buddhist religion and his school of “Pacification” (Zhi byed). As Padmasambahva continued his journey, a cow started following him; however, he asked the cow to go back. As soon as he made this request, the cow disappeared into a boulder on which the words "Ma" appeared (self manifested) prophetically. Padmasambhava considered this as a divine direction to him to set up a monastery at the location. When he was in a dilemma in taking decision to either build a monastery for monks or a nunnery at this place, he heard divine voices from the nearby mountain pass (known as Rta ma do nyag) and also saw dancing female deities. Favouring establishment of a nunnery here, he named it as a “Dance Gompa: Place of Meditative Equipoise” (Gar dgon bsam gtan gling). A square throne on which he sat while doing the rites for the “site investigations” (sa dpyad), has since disappeared. However, the boulder on which the word "Ma" appeared, called the “a ma boulder” is still present here.

Fund raising for the reconstruction of the nunnery began in 1980, upon the request of 14 former nuns. They raised 390,000 ¥ from the Tibetan laity, and 20,000¥ from the local government authorities and restored the nunnery in 1985.

== Structures ==
Garu Nunnery is a very large structure and within the perimeter walls it contains several sub-compounds and building complexes. The main structure contains the main temple, a Scripture temple, the kitchen, and several small chapels, a butter-lamp offering house and a nightwatch building. Along with two wings of the nun's quarters, these buildings, believed to be the oldest, form the central courtyard of the hermitage.

To the north of the main temple, there is a long wing of nuns quarters. Along the eastern edge of the nunnery, there is a small park which is used for public performances such as folk opera and festivals. At the northern edge of the park are a stūpa and a guest house, erected in 2004. Several small shrines are also found just outside the southern perimeter wall of the nunnery which are related to original visionary of the nunnery.

Because much of the old nunnery was destroyed during the Cultural Revolution, the art inside the temple is new. The old temple was known to have twelve pillars and a central image on its main altar, a Thousand-Armed Avalokiteśvara, one-story tall. Today the Garu temple has eight pillars but it also has a two-pillar rear chapel. It is flanked to the right by a statue of Pha dam pa sangs rgyas as an eight-year-old child with a manuscript text of a prayer (about ten folios in length) written by Pha dam pa sangs rgyas himself. This is considered as the main sanctum of the nunnery. The temple at one time (before 1959) had a series of fifteen extremely well executed thangkas of the “Eighty Deeds of Tsongkhapa” (tsong kha brgyad bcu) which was gifted to the monastery by a Mongolian queen. The nuns refused to part with them even when the Thirteenth Dalai Lama (Da lai bla ma sku phreng bcu gsum pa) wanted to take them to the Norbugling kha, his summer palace. They now remain untraced.

Past artefacts

The artefacts, statues, frescos, Thangkas and many other rare objects that were listed as existing prior to the Cultural Revolution included: the life-size figure of Vajrayogini (Rdo rje rnal ’byor ma), statues of several incarnations of the Dalai Lamas, four metal-alloy statues of the Drakri incarnations (Brag ri sprul sku), two sets of statues of the 'Eight Medicine Buddhas' (Sman bla bde gshegs brgyad), a text of the Eight Thousand Line Perfection of Wisdom Sūtra (’Phags pa shes rab kyi pha rol tu phyin pa brgyad stong pa’i mdo, Āryāṣṭasāhasrikāprajñāpāramitā Sūtra) written in gold, eight "shāli stūpas of India”, statues of the Sixteen Arhats (Gnas brtan bcu drug), Six-Armed Mahākāla (Mgon po phyag drug), and Hayagrīva in his “Secret Accomplishment” form (Rta mgrin gsang sgrub).

== Post revolution protests ==
Garu Nunnery had 130 nuns (including ten older nuns) in 1988. It was restored in 1988, after the Cultural Revolution, with grants provided by the government in Tibet. The nuns hail from Phembo village, 60 km to the east of Lhasa, and are supported by their families. In 1988, some nuns of the monastery distributed printed advertising material and shouted slogans seeking the independence of Tibet in the Barkhor. After the demonstrations, security measures were tightened on the nunnery, all of the residing nuns had to register with the state, and further recruitment to the nunnery was stopped. Ten nuns were arrested in February 1990 for putting up pro-independence posters in the nunnery compound. The leader of the protest, Gwalmo Wangmo, was expelled from the nunnery.

The 13 nuns (all in teens and twenties) were arrested for the protest demonstration that they held at Barkhor. They had distributed printed advertising material and shouted slogans seeking independence of Tibet. They were arrested as they were returning from Sera Monastery. They were treated brutally, both during and after the arrests, and sexually abused. To quote the words of an arrested nun:

"They would strip us naked, bend over us, and then start beating us. They took off all our clothes. One would hold your arm, twist and drop you to the ground, while another would hold your arm and twist, and another would step on your head and keep it down. Then the fourth person would take your clothes off and beat you with a stick. They did not tie us and hang us up, but they tied me against a wall and gave me shocks. They would prod us all over our backs. They would expose our breasts and prod us. They would make us sit on a chair and then slap our faces and push us off the chair so that we fell to the ground."

Gwalmo Wangmo, a nun of this monastery, is well known for her heroics of protests against the Chinese occupation of the nunnery. She was arrested first in 1988 and detained for six months in Gutsa jail. She was again arrested in February 1990 at the nunnery along with nine others since they had put up posters in the nunnery compound protesting when a “work team” of the Chinese administration were conducting “screening and re-education” in the nunnery. She was released six months later and was also expelled from the nunnery.
