= Nagqu Hotel =

Hotel in Nagqu, Tibet, China

Coordinates: 31.4758°N 92.0629°E

Nagqu Hotel (那曲饭店), or Naqu Hotel, is a hotel located in Seni District, Nagqu, China.

== History ==
In June 1984, the construction of Nagqu Hotel was started as one of the 43 Aid Projects to Tibet, and completed in August 1985, with a total investment of 13.1 million yuan, designed and constructed by Chengdu Architectural Design & Research Institute (Chinese: 成都市建筑设计研究院) and Chengdu Architectural Engineering Corporation (Chinese: 成都市建筑工程总公司). Hotel construction area of 8805 square meters, with elegant chic, fresh style of architectural features. It is equipped with reception hall, conference room, restaurant, entertainment room and supporting facilities, which was the largest, highest standard and most invested modern building in Nagqu area at that time. In 1995, the hotel carried out large-scale renovation and decoration for the reception hall and the west building, which improved the scale and grade. In 1997, the hotel increased the efforts of hardware construction.
