= Lhasa Youth Activity Center =

Youth center in Lhasa, Tibet, China

Coordinates: 29.65367°N 91.16525°E

Lhasa Youth Activity Center (Chinese: 拉萨市青少年活动中心) is a municipal youth activity center in Lhasa, Tibet Autonomous Region, China.

== History ==
it was listed as one of the 43 Aid Projects to Tibet, invested and supported by Jiangsu Province in 1984. The project started in August 1984, in July 1985 was completed. It was initially managed by Lhasa Municipal Education and Sports Committee, and in 1992, the Lhasa Municipal Committee of the Communist Youth League of China managed it.

Ngapoi Ngawang Jigme, Vice Chairman of the National Committee of the Chinese People's Political Consultative Conference, and his wife, Ngapoi Cedain Zhoigar, donated 660,000 yuan for the construction of the center's cultural and sports building.

In 2010, with the financial support of Jiangsu Province to aid Tibet, the Lhasa Youth Activity Center building with an investment of more than 20 million yuan, covering an area of more than 20 acres and with a construction area of 5,033.9 square meters, was completed at the new site of Jiangsu Avenue West Second Road.
