= Gyangtse Hotel =

Hotel in Shigatse, Tibet, China

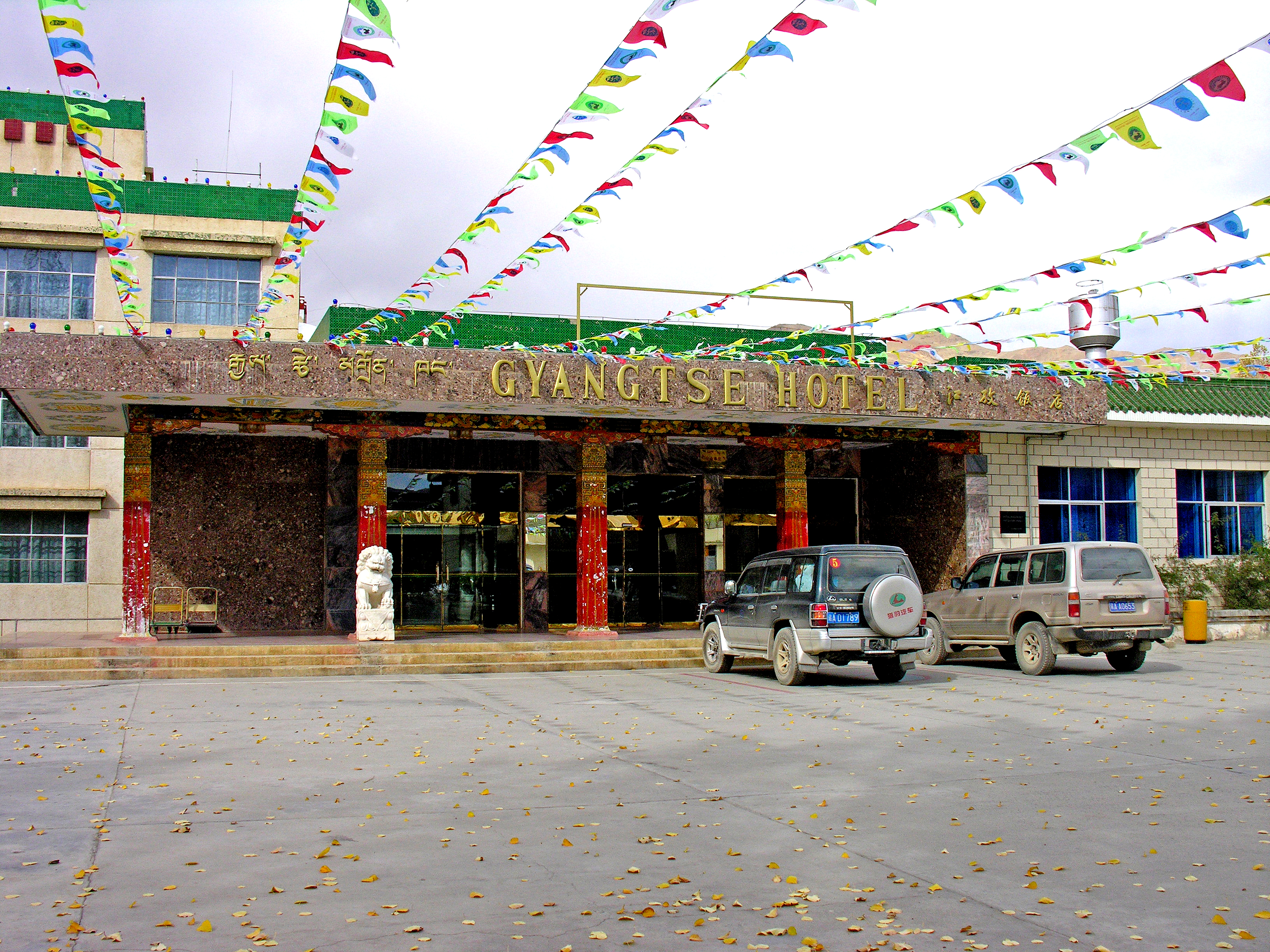
Gyangtse Hotel

Gyantse Hotel (江孜宾馆), is a hotel located in Gyantse County, Shigatse, Tibet Autonomous Region.

== History ==
Gyantse Hotel is one of the 43 Aid Projects to Tibet established in 1984 and invested by Shandong Province. In June 1986, the state invested 6.4 million RMB to upgrade Gyantse Hotel, and reopened in 1988. In November 1998, Gyantse Hotel invested 2.3 million RMB to renew and renovate 102 rooms, so as to make the hardware reach the standard of a three-star hotel.
