= Shigatse Hotel =

Hotel in Tibet, China

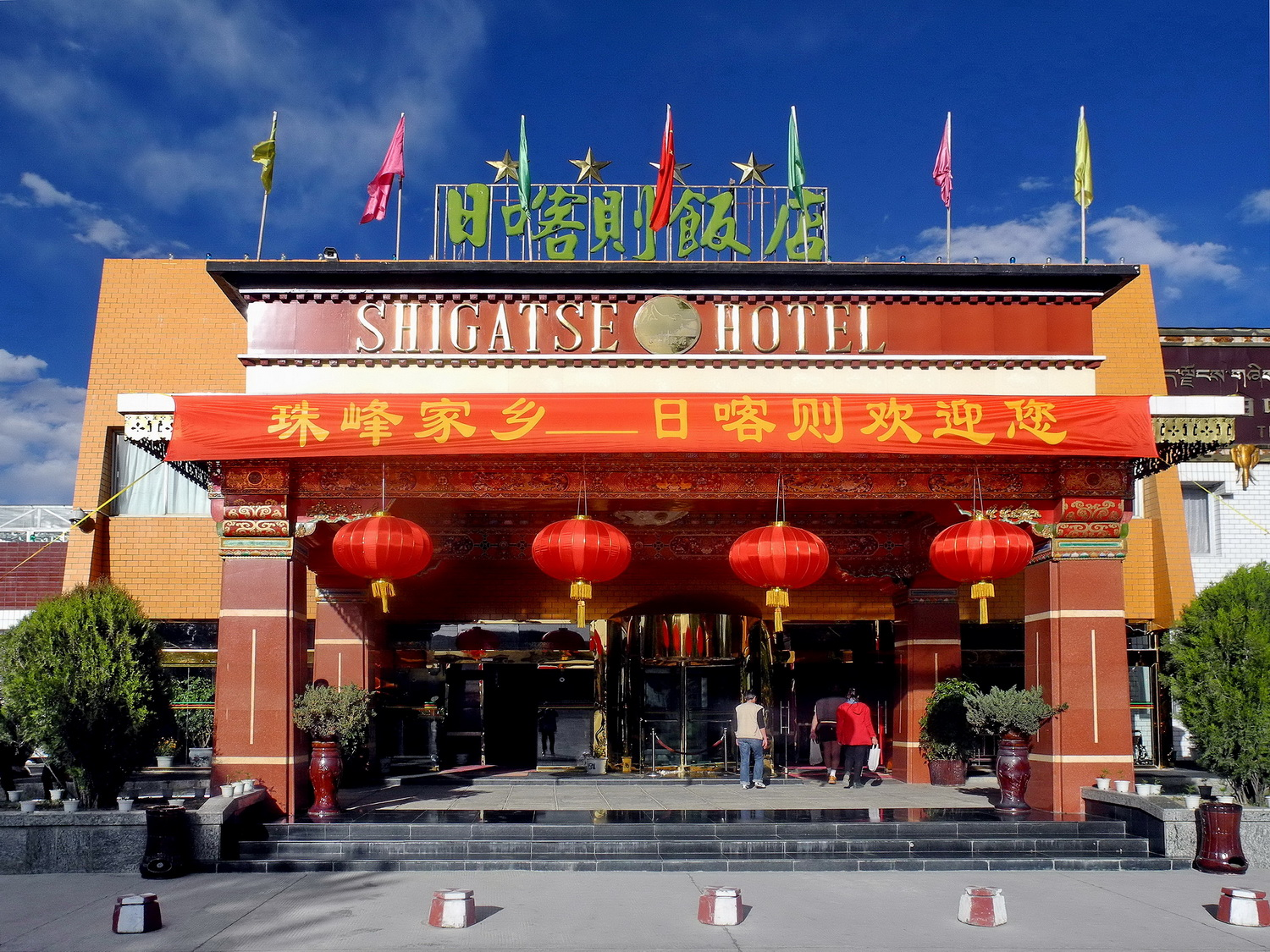
Shigatse Hotel

Shigatse Hotel is a hotel located in Samzhubzê, Xigazê, Tibet Autonomous Region.

== History ==
Shigatse Hotel is one of the 43 Aid Projects to Tibet identified in 1984, which was built with the aid of Shandong Province. In 1985, on the 20th anniversary of the founding of the Tibet Autonomous Region, Shigatse Hotel and Shigatse Regional Department Store Building were formally constructed.

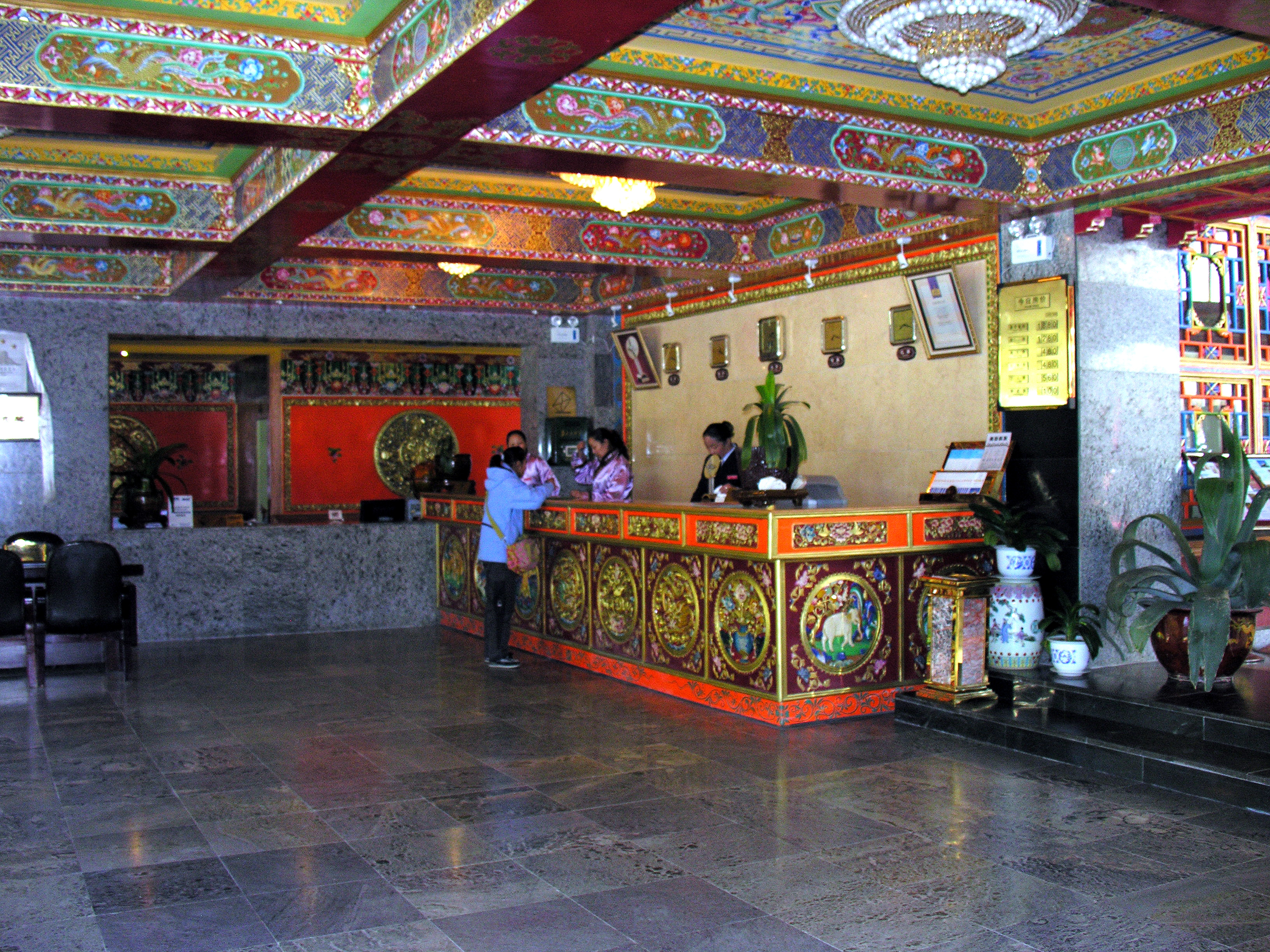

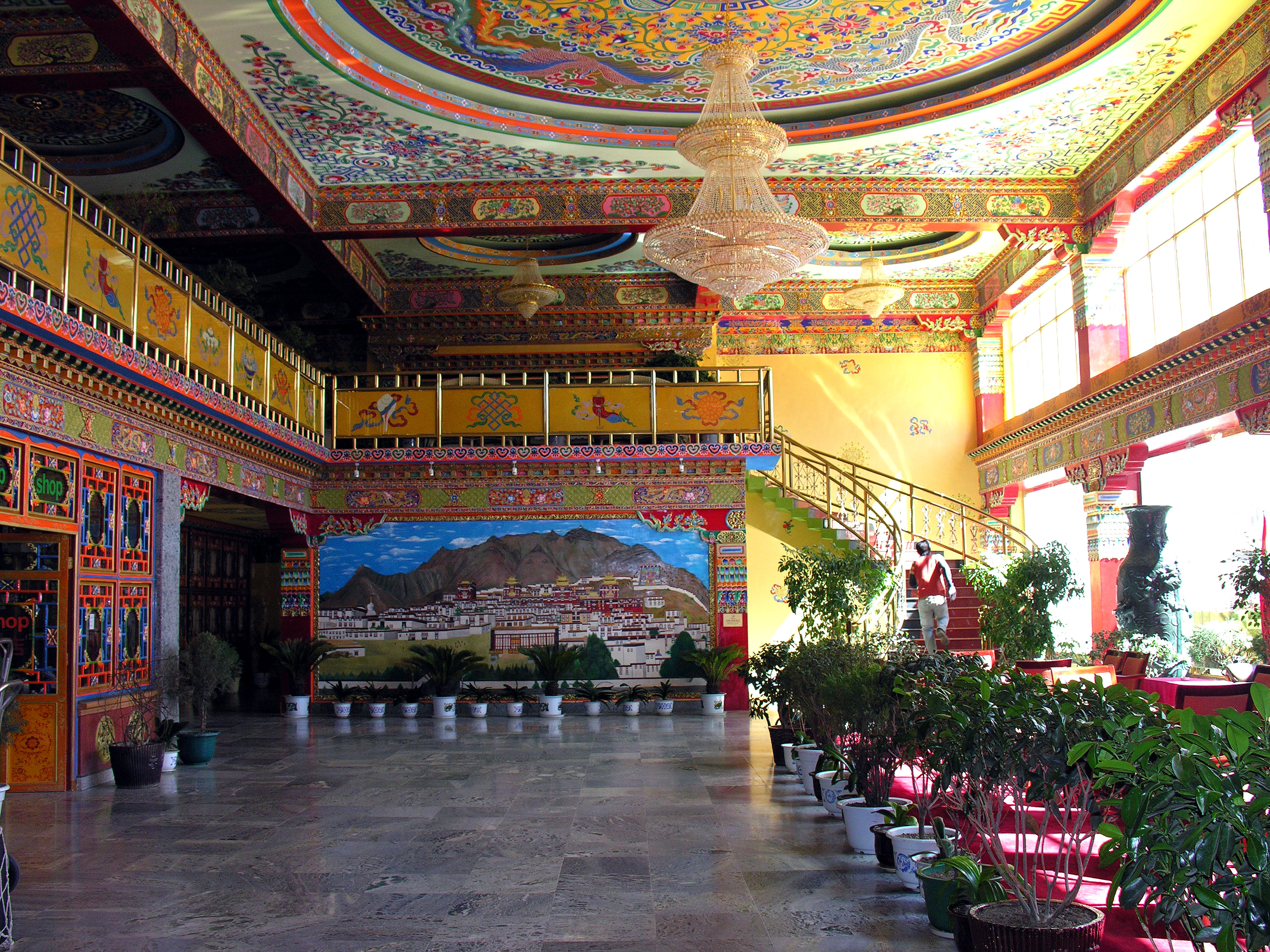

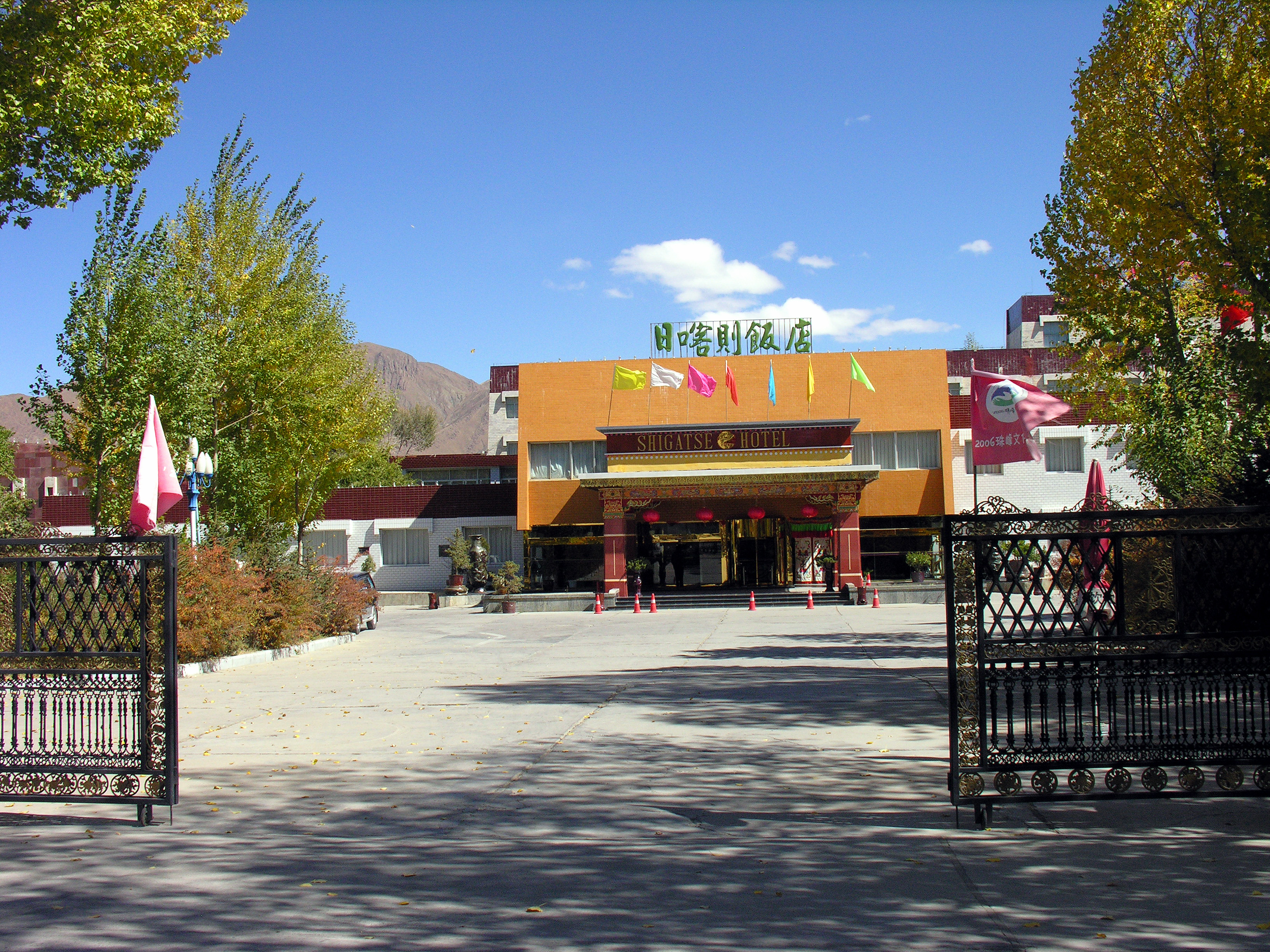
