= Chupzang Nunnery =

Tibetan Buddhist nunnery near Lhasa, Tibet, China

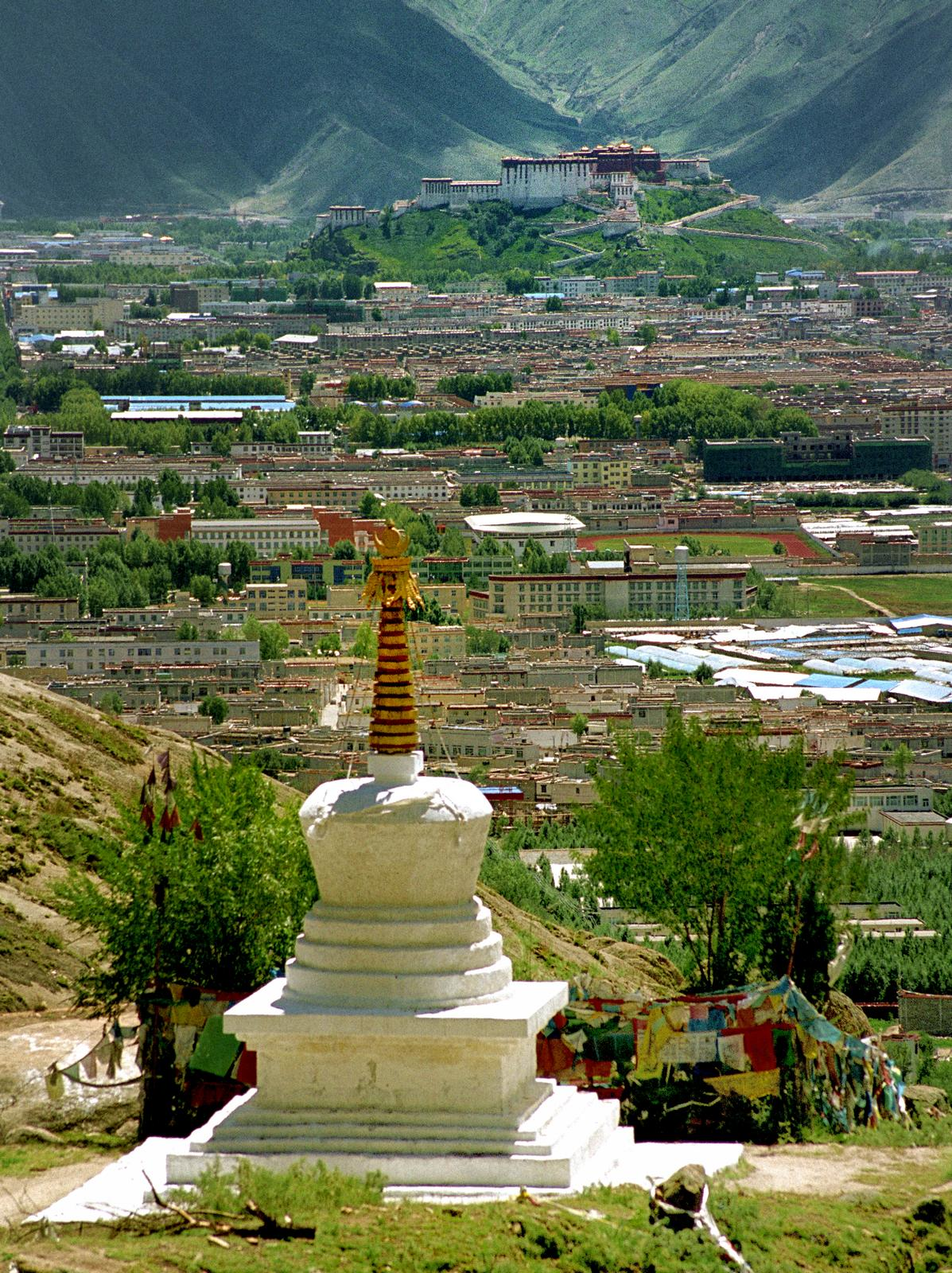
- A panoramic view of Chubchang (Nunnery)

- Location within Tibet

Religion
- Affiliation: Tibetan Buddhism

Location
- Location: Lhasa Prefecture, Tibet, China
- Country: China
- Coordinates: 29°42′45″N 91°7′19″E

Architecture
- Established: 1665 (formally 1696)

Chupzang Nunnery (Chu bzang dgon) is a historical nunnery, belonging to Sera Monastery. It is located north of Lhasa in Tibet, China. Though the site was established as a hermitage around 1665, it was converted into an exclusive nunnery in 1984 and has since grown into one of the largest nunneries in the Lhasa Valley.

Chupzang, also spelt Chubzang, in Tibetan means "fresh water" or "good water" and is so-named because water is supplied by a natural spring.

== Geography ==
The Chubzang Nunnery, located on the hill side, is situated to the northwest of Sera Monastery and to the north of Lhasa in the suburb of Nyang bran, at the base of the rocky canyon which is covered with shrubs. It is approachable by about a 1 kilometre (0.62 mi) path from Sera, which takes about 20 minutes to cover. It is also approachable from Trashi Chöling Hermitage from the south-east direction. As originally built, the hermitage (ri khrod) faces south. The layout of the hermitage has three components. The first part, on the extreme north, consists of a multitude of stupas (reliquaries) amidst painted rocks that depict craven images said to be ‘self-arisen’. The second part, which is the main hermitage complex, is to the south of the stupas and has the monastery with the Dharma courtyard (chosrwa), and a secondary temple. The third part, to the south of the temple complex, has a plethora of apartments, which are all privately owned by the nuns themselves.

== History ==
The nunnery was originally a hermitage believed to have been founded by Trinlé Gyatso (Phrin las rgya mtsho) (d. 1667), who was the regent of Tibet from 1665 till his death. Trinlé Gyatso belonged to Nyangdren (in the suburb of Lhasa to the west of Sera). Trinlé Gyatso was a student of the Fifth Dalai Lama. He was also the uncle of Desi Sanggyé Gyatso (1653–1705), who was also a student of the Fifth Dalai Lama's and who also became the regent of Tibet. It is also mentioned that the Fifth Dalai Lama wanted initially to favour Sanggyé Gyatso by appointing him as regent of Tibet.

However, good counsel prevailed, and to avoid any public protests he appointed Trinlé Gyatso as the regent until his nephew gained more experience and attained maturity before becoming the regent. Then, Trinlé Gyatso, in the later part of his life, requested the Fifth Dalai Lama's permission to build a hermitage for eight monks initially (it is said that it was later increased to a core group of 16 ordained monks - 8 from each of the two colleges of Sera Je and Sera Me of Sera Monastery) in the foothills above his native Nyangbran and invited the Fifth Dalai Lama to perform a “site investigation” (sa brtag) to determine the most auspicious location on which to build the monastery. The Dalai Lama made the treasure (gter) discovery of the self-arisen stone image of the Buddha that is still located in Chupzang's lower temple, and he also gave the name to the hermitage.

However, the initial hermitage fell into ruin and the official founding of a new hermitage is credited to Phrin las rgya mtsho's nephew, Sde srid sangs rgyas rgya mtsho, in around 1696. The ruins of the original hermitage are still seen at the site. Chubzang was one of the five hermitages that belonged to Sera Me college; the other four were Pabonka, Jogbo, Tashi Choiling and Pinglung.

The hermitage belonged to Chupzang Yeshé Gyatso (Chu bzang ye shes rgya mtsho) (1789–1856) in the eighteenth century, who built a four-pillar temple with rear chapel and porticos at the site. It was later under the possession of Byang chub chos ’phel, the sixty-ninth throne holder of Ganden (Ganden Tripa). Subsequently, Khri byang sku phreng gsum pa blo bzang yeshes, who was a junior tutor to the living 14th Dalai Lama became in charge of the hermitage. In 1921, Pha bong kha bde chen snying po (1878–1941) stayed at Chubzang and published his teachings in his most famous work, Liberation in Our Hands (Rnam grol lagbcangs).

In the 1950s, the site became a religious retirement community for elderly Lhasans. These elders constructed small huts to spend the last years of their life in prayers and meditation according to Buddhist practice. However, during the Cultural Revolution the place became a general housing complex for people. It was only in the 1980s that Nuns began to renovate the site. They founded the modern nunnery (as seen at present), in 1984, which has since grown into one of the largest nunneries in the Lhasa Valley. However, somewhat unusually, the houses are owned individually by the nuns, but the nunnery has an administrative body and a site for communal gathering.

== Architecture ==
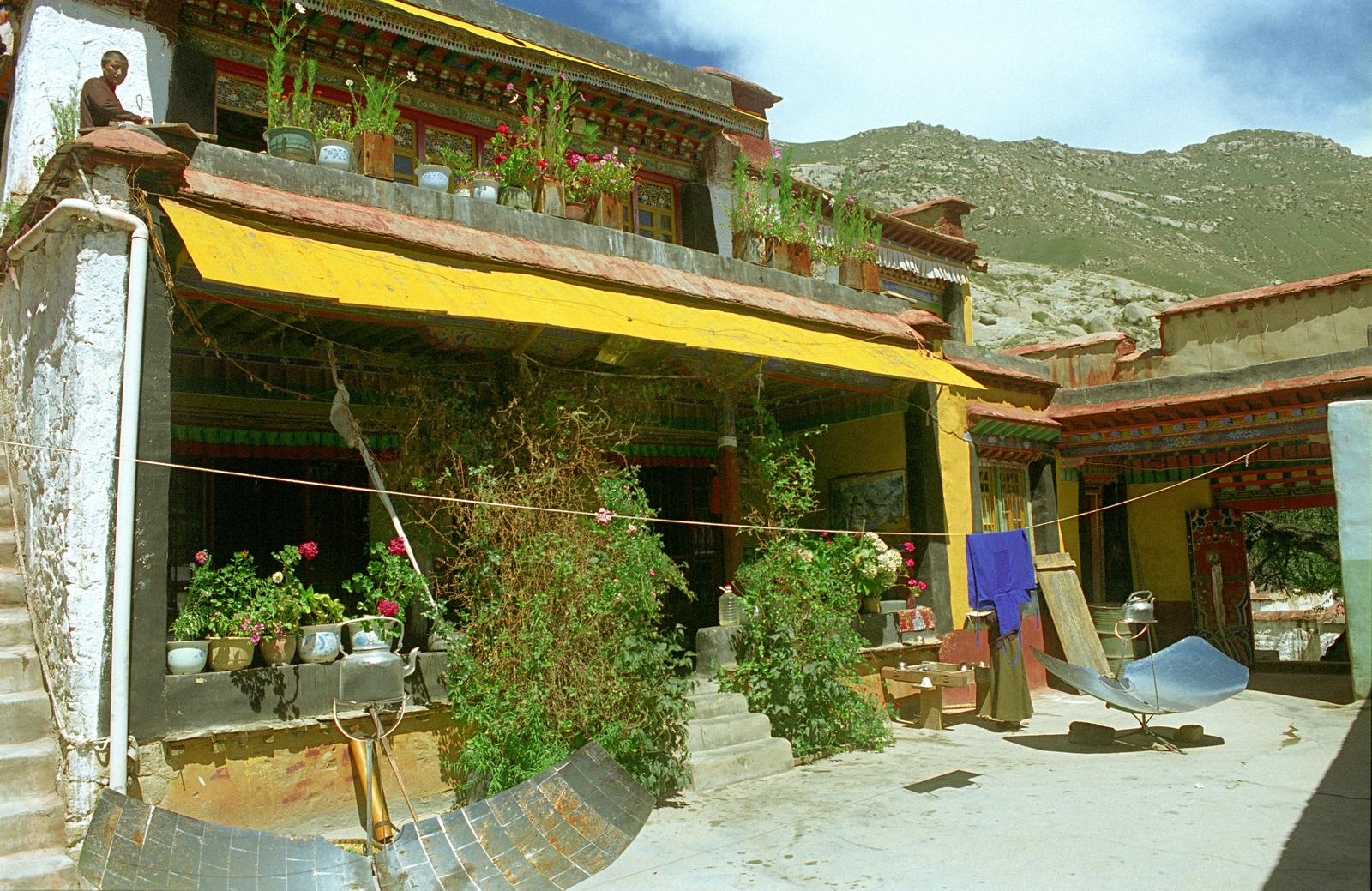
The Chubzang Nunnery

The nunnery consists of two wings. The upper wing is the main temple wing with an attached enclosure for lighting butter lamps. The second part is the Dukhang or the Assembly Hall.

The main temple wing has an assembly hall where two sets of the idols of Tsong Khapa are deified, flanked by his two favourite disciples. Further to the north east of the hall is a protector deity chapel (mgon khang) where images of Gnas Chung, Lha Mo, six-armed Mahakala (Mgon po phyag drug), Dharmarāja (Dam chen chos rgyal), Rdo rje g.yu sgron ma and two tutelary deities (yi dam) of the nunnery - Vajrabhairava (Rdo rje ’jigs byed) and Vajrayogini (Rdo rje rnal ’byor ma), the supreme deity of the Tantric pantheon - are worshipped.

The Dharma enclosure (chosrwa) to the west of the temple is an area where nuns sit in the open and recite Buddhist scriptures and memorize them. A small chapel inside the courtyard has an image of the protector deity Rdo rje g.yu sgron ma. The stone image (rdo sku) of the Buddha said to have been “discovered as treasure” (gter nas ston pa) by the Fifth Dalai Lama is located in a secondary temple, which is situated to the south of the Dharma enclosure. There is also a reception room close by in a courtyard. At one time there were 90 Gelukpa nuns residing here.

The pilgrim route of circumambulation of the Pamwangka, Tashi Choling, Tokden Drubuk and Chubzang Nunnery took a day to cover during the summer season.

Structures predating the 1960s

While the above details are of recent structures, some details of the temple and the images that existed in the past are also given in a catalogue titled the "Monasteries of Lhasa: A Heap of Jewels"; hereafter Lha sa’i dgon tho (Bod ljongs mi dmangs dpe skrun khang, 2001)". The details mentioned relate to the main temple images found at the end of 17th century namely, the Buddha, the Medicine Buddha (Sman bla), Avalokiteśvara and the Fifth Dalai Lama (Da lai bla ma sku phreng lnga pa, 1617–1682). In the chapel known as the Chimed Lhakhang, images seen were of Nine Deities related to Amitāyus (Tshe dpag med lha dgu). A Tārā Chapel (Sgrol ma lha khang) is also mentioned.

== 1960s–present ==
Chupzang nunnery or Ani Gompa (Tibetan terminology used for Nunnery) was rebuilt as part of the rebuilding activity undertaken, after 1980, without interference from the Chinese. The monastery was rebuilt some time between 1985 and 1986, after it was destroyed during the cultural revolution. Chupzang is under the authority of the senior monk of the Sera Monastery. Eight Sera monks are said to visit the monastery to perform religious rites and to teach the nuns residing here. The nuns are all young (in teens and twenties) from nearby villages who stated their background as “Middle Peasants” conforming to the Chinese communist system. In 1988, there were reports of eighty nuns residing here including a few older nuns (who were here even prior to Cultural Revolution of 1959). Admission of nuns to the monastery was approved by the Lama of Sera Monastery, provided there was accommodation in the nunnery.

However, the nuns were not officially registered in the nunnery as they had to retain their original ration cards issued in their villages. As the government did not provide any funds for the nunnery the sustainability of nuns residing here was through family support and donations. The nunnery now does not have a democratically elected management committee but a local political leader of 'xiang' is responsible for the monastery and he is said to visit the nunnery very rarely – once or twice a year.

Nuns from this monastery were involved in staging protests against the government during the period of protest from several monasteries from 1988 to 1989 in Tibet. Nuns were arrested and released from jail a few months later.
