= Lhasa Feed Processing Plant =

Lhasa Feed Processing Plant is a feed processing plant located in Lhasa, Tibet Autonomous Region.

== History ==
Lhasa Feed Processing Plant is one of the 43 Aid Projects to Tibet invested by Zhejiang Province. On June 18, 1985, Lhasa Feed Processing Plant, with an annual output of nearly 10 million pounds of compound feed, was put into operation. The plant was designed by the Sichuan Provincial Design Department and constructed by the Tibet Autonomous Region Engineering Department as one of the forty-three key projects for the construction of Tibet.
