= Tibet Autonomous Region Mass Art Museum =

Art museum in Lhasa, Tibet, China

Coordinates: 29.65008°N 91.12756°E

The Tibet Autonomous Region Mass Art Museum (Chinese: 西藏自治区群众艺术馆) is an autonomous region-level mass art museum in the Tibet Autonomous Region of China, located at No. 2 Dosenger Road in Lhasa.

== History ==
The museum building is one of the 43 Aid Projects to Tibet, which was built with the aid of Tianjin Municipality. The Tibet Autonomous Region Mass Art Museum was designed by the Tianjin Architectural Design Institute, and construction began on May 21, 1984, by the Tianjin Second Construction Engineering Company. In May 1985, the Tibet Autonomous Region Mass Art Center was built.
