= Tibet Stadium =

Sports venue in Lhasa, Tibet, China

Tibet Stadium (Chinese: 西藏体育馆) is the first modernized and multi-functional Stadium in Tibet. The stadium is located at No. 27, Nyange Road, Chengguan District, Lhasa.

== History ==
Tibet Stadium is located in Nyange Road, Lhasa, breaking ground in May 1984 and completed in July 1985, it is one of the three key projects of the 43 Aid Projects to Tibet. It covers a total area of 21,200 square meters, with a building area of 8,000 square meters, including the competition hall, ticketing room, communication room, commissary, water pump room, substation, boiler room, public toilets, as well as plaza, sculpture, fountains, greening, roads, parking pads, fences, etc. The design of the Stadium is based on sports competitions.

The stadium has advanced sound, air conditioning and oxygen supply equipment, the north and south stands are equipped with two computer-controlled large-scale electronic automatic display of timing scoreboard, available Tibetan, Chinese and English three kinds of text display game results.
