= Tibet Hotel =

Hotel in Lhasa, Tibet, China

Coordinates: 29.65941°N 91.08862°E

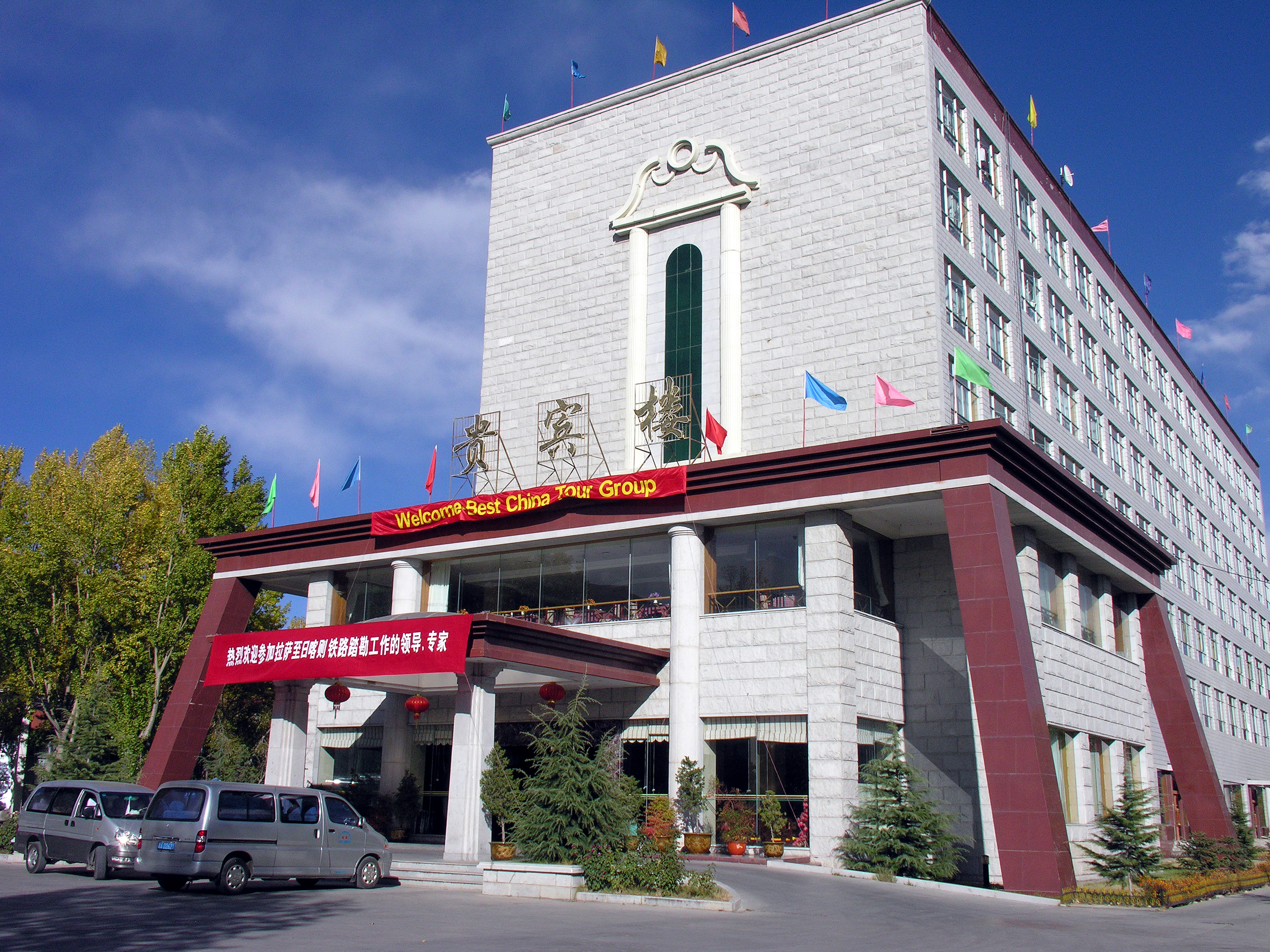

Tibet Hotel is a four-star hotel located in Lhasa, Tibet Autonomous Region, China, at No. 64 Beijing Middle Road, Lhasa.

== History ==
It is a "natural oxygen bar" hotel with a lake inside. The hotel is one of the 43 Aid Projects to Tibet, invested and supported by Fujian Province.

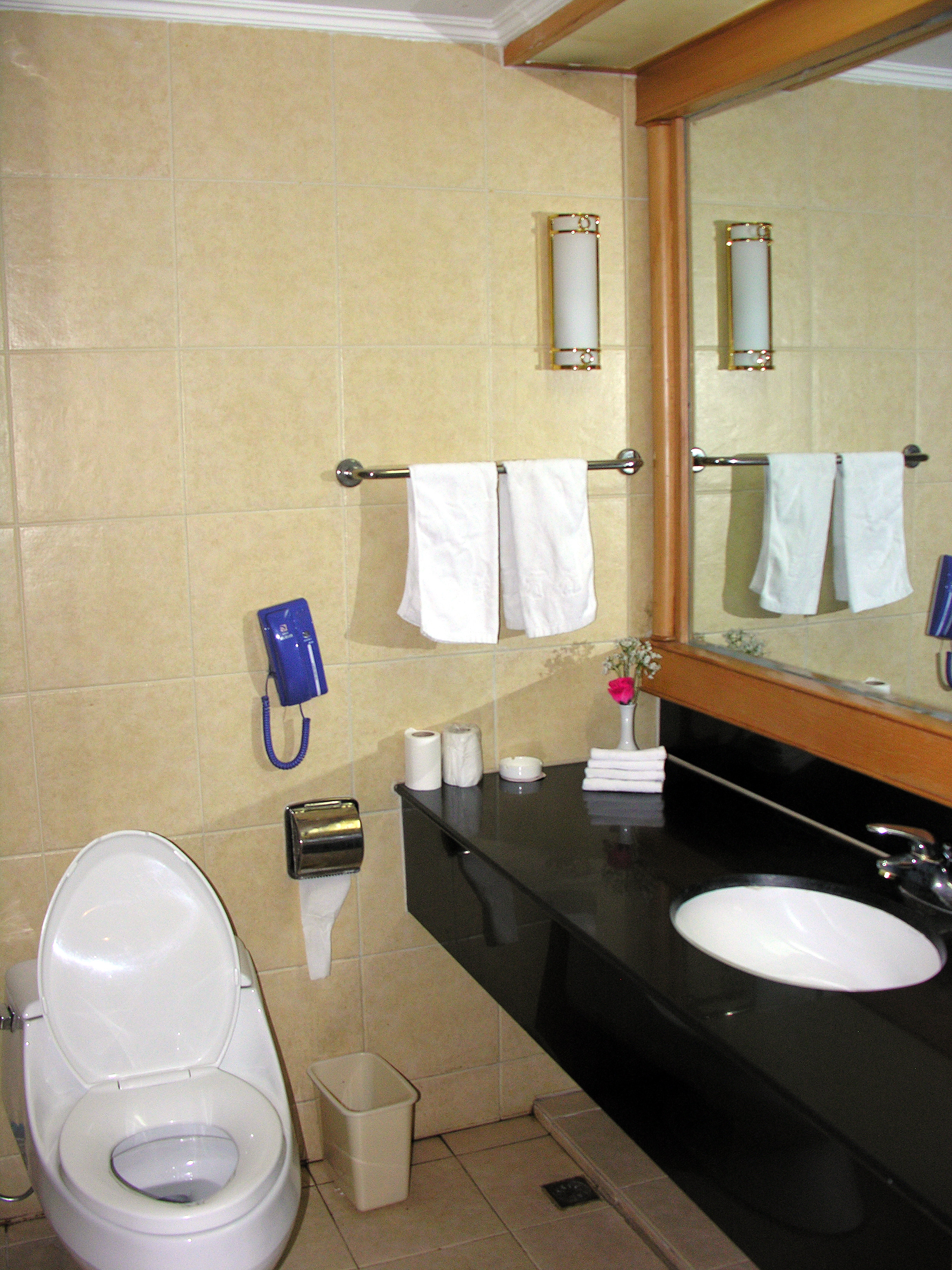
Guest room lavatory

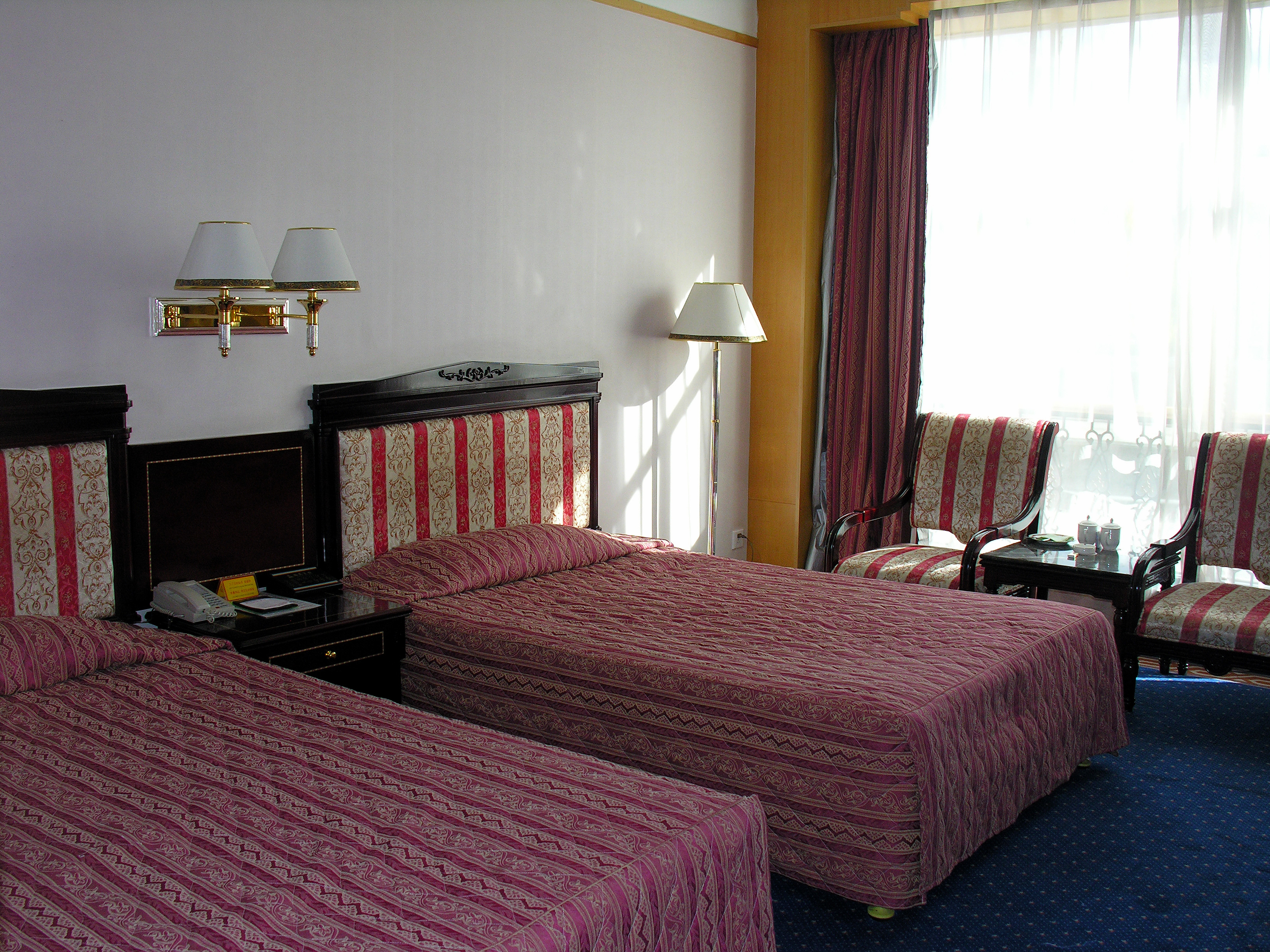
Room
