= Cisongtang Park =

Water park in Lhasa, Tibet, China

Coordinates: 29.6802°N 91.1322°E

Cisongtang Park (Chinese: 慈松塘公园) is the largest water park in Lhasa, Tibet Autonomous Region of China, located near Cisongtang Middle Road in Lhasa, adjacent to the Lhasa Racecourse, and containing an artificial lake. The park was built in 2007 on a sandy site.

In the vicinity of Cisongtang Park, the thrift market on Cisongtang Middle Road is also a special feature of this area.
