= Tsedang Hotel =

Hotel in Shannan, Tibet, China

Tibet Zedang Hotel, or Tsedang Hotel, is a hotel located in Naidong Road, Zedang Town, Shannan, Tibet.

== History ==
Zedang Hotel is one of the 43 Aid Projects to Tibet in 1984, and is the first international four-star foreign hotel in Shannan. The hotel is located in the Yalong scenic spot in Tibet, the ancient town of Shannan Zedang, 97 kilometers away from Lhasa Gongga Airport, about 150 kilometers away from Lhasa. In 2007, the hotel was rated as a four-star tourist and foreign-related hotel by the National Tourism Administration of the People's Republic of China. In 2011, the hotel was honored as the most charming hotel in Tibet by the Tibet Autonomous Region Tourism Bureau.
