= Lhasa Passenger Station =

Bus station in Lhasa, Tibet, China

Lhasa Passenger Station (Chinese: 拉萨客运站) or Lhasa Bus Station (Chinese: 拉萨汽车站), often referred to as the "Western Suburb Bus Station", was a bus station in Lhasa.

== History ==
Lhasa Passenger Station built in 1984 as one of the 43 Aid Projects to Tibet, and became the earliest bus station in Lhasa. It used to be the core of Lhasa's transportation, from which wheels rolled to all corners of Tibet, but with the development of transportation, many routes were diverted to other stations or replaced by other modes of transportation. Today, only a few lines remain here, including Shannan, Shigatse, Nagqu and Mainling.
