= Lhasa Hotel =

Hotel in Lhasa, Tibet, China

Coordinates: 29°39′29″N 91°05′41″E

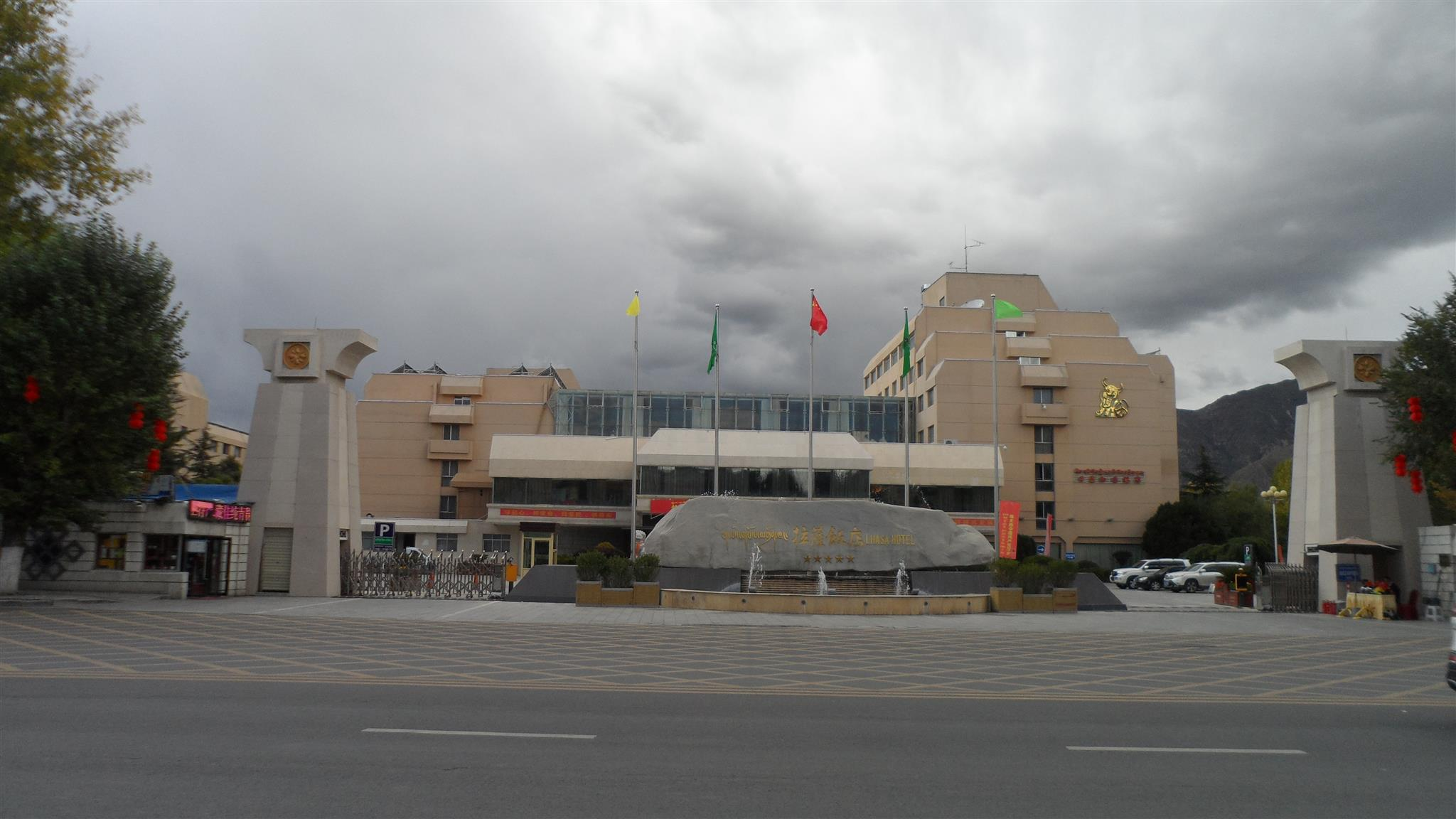
Lhasa Hotel

The Lhasa Hotel (Chinese: 拉萨饭店), formerly known as Holiday Inn Lhasa is a 4-star hotel in the city of Lhasa, Tibet, China; lying at an altitude of 3,600 m.

== History ==
Completed in September 1985 as one of 43 Aid Projects to Tibet, it is located northeast of the Norbu Lingka Summer Palace in west of Lhasa. The hotel is the flagship of the China International Travel Service' installations in Tibet. It accommodates about 1,000 guests over 450 rooms (suites).

== In media ==
An account of running the hotel is related in the 2001 book The Hotel on the Roof of the World.
