= Shigatse People's Hospital =

Hospital in Shigatse, Tibet, China

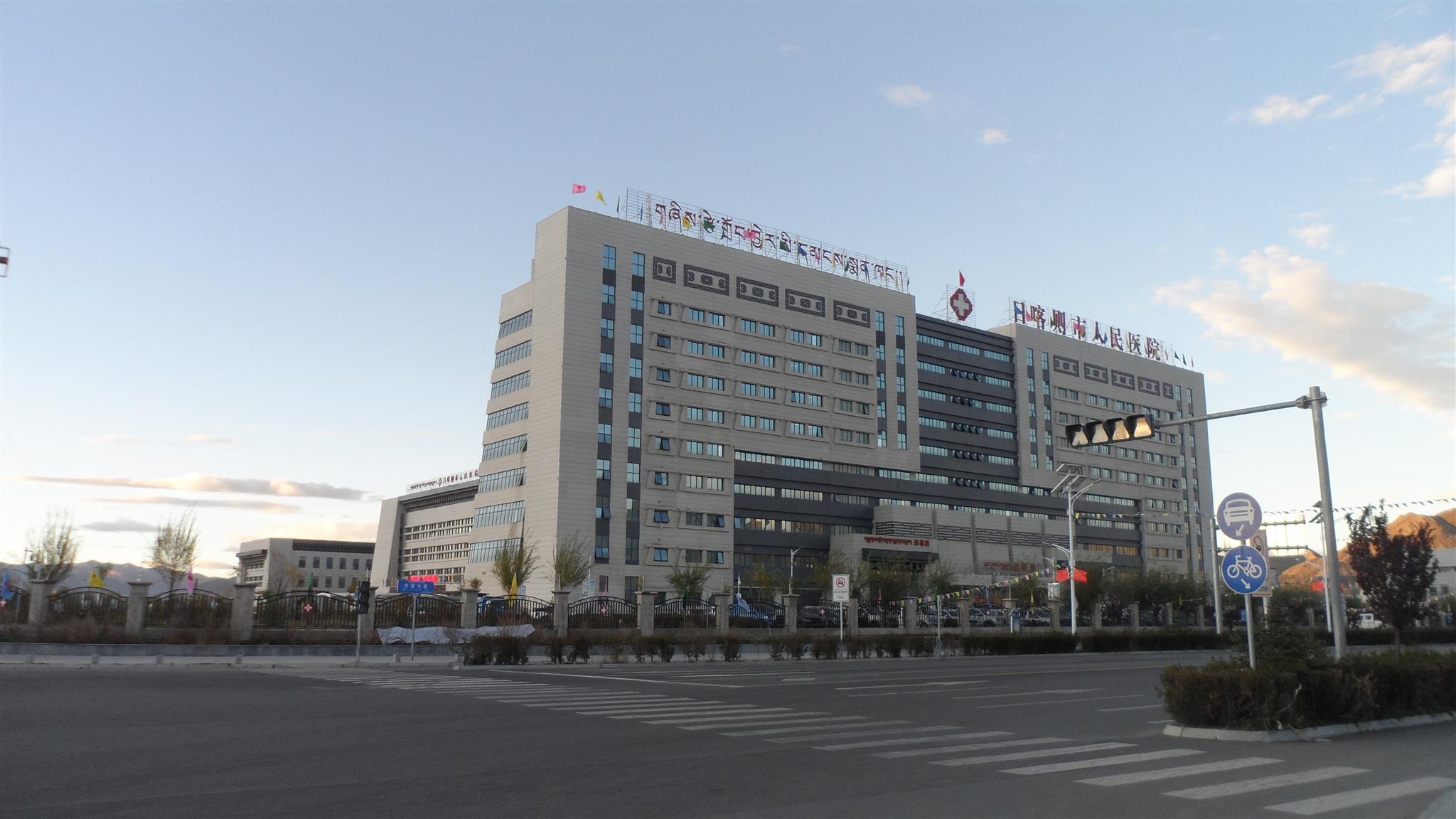
Shigatse People's Hospital

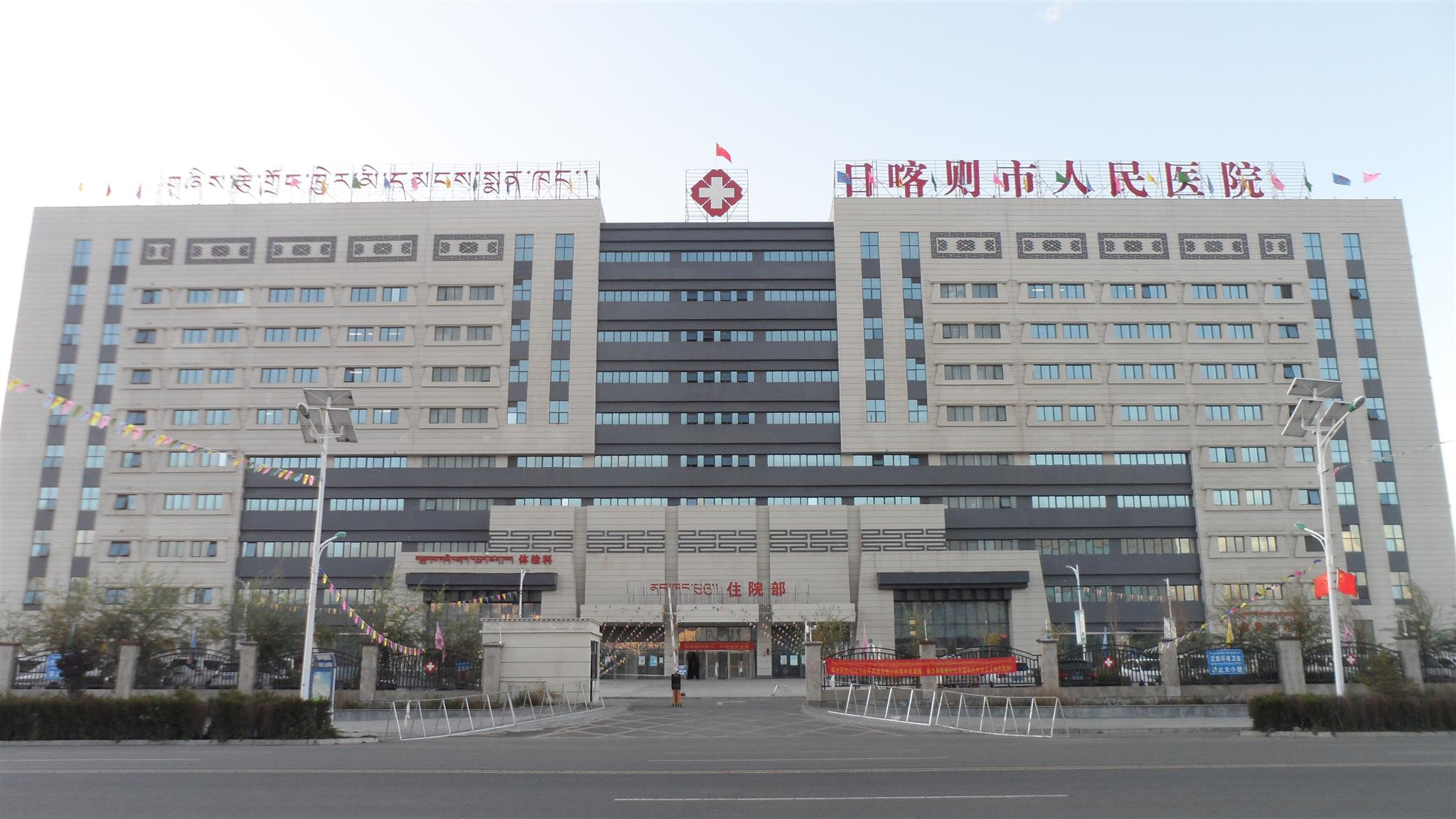
Shigatse People's Hospital

Shigatse People's Hospital (Chinese: 日喀则市人民医院) is the largest public hospital in Shigatse, located on South Jilin Road.

== History ==
In 1955, originally for the Chinese people's liberation army with the army medical team and Panchen Lama medical team, later reorganized as the People's Hospital in Shigatse was established. Subsequently, it gradually became the hospital with the most complete departments and the strongest technical force in Shigatse.

In October 2017, the hospital's new compound was put into use, becoming one of the hospitals with the best hardware facilities in Tibet. In mid-June 2018, the Shigatse People's Hospital, which is supported by Shanghai, was officially licensed as a "three-A" hospital, becoming the first 3A-level general hospital in Shigatse.
