= Shannan People's Hospital =

Hospital in Shannan, Tibet, China

Shannan People's Hospital (Chinese: 山南市人民医院; Tibetan: ལྷ་ས་གྲོང་ཁྱེར་སྨན་ཁང་།) is a hospital in Zetang Town, Shannan Prefecture, Tibet, China. The hospital was founded in August 1956. It was designated a Grade III Class A hospital in 2018, the sole hospital in Shannan, Tibet with that national accreditation.
