= People's Hospital of Tibet Autonomous Region =

Hospital in Lhasa, Tibet, China

Tibet Autonomous Region People's Hospital or People's Hospital of Tibet Autonomous Region (Chinese: 西藏自治区人民医院) is the largest tertiary hospital in the Tibet Autonomous Region (TAR) of China, located at No. 18, Lincuo North Road, Lhasa. It is the largest multi-purpose general hospital in Tibet and a Grade 3A hospital.

== History ==
The former Lhasa Clinic of the People's Liberation Army (PLA) was established on December 26, 1951. New hospital was founded on September 8, 1952, and was originally called "People's Hospital of Lhasa", and was renamed "Tibet Autonomous Region People's Hospital" in 1962, and was officially renamed "Tibet Autonomous Region People's Hospital" on September 1, 1965, when the Tibet Autonomous Region was established. It is a comprehensive medical institution with western medicine as its main specialty, and traditional Chinese medicine and acupuncture as its other specialties, and is the center of medical treatment, scientific research and teaching in the Tibet Autonomous Region.
