= Pabonka Hermitage =

Hermitage of the Sera Monastery

- Tibetan transcription(s); Wylie transliteration: Pha bong kha Chinese transcription(s); Traditional: 帕邦喀; Simplified: 帕邦喀
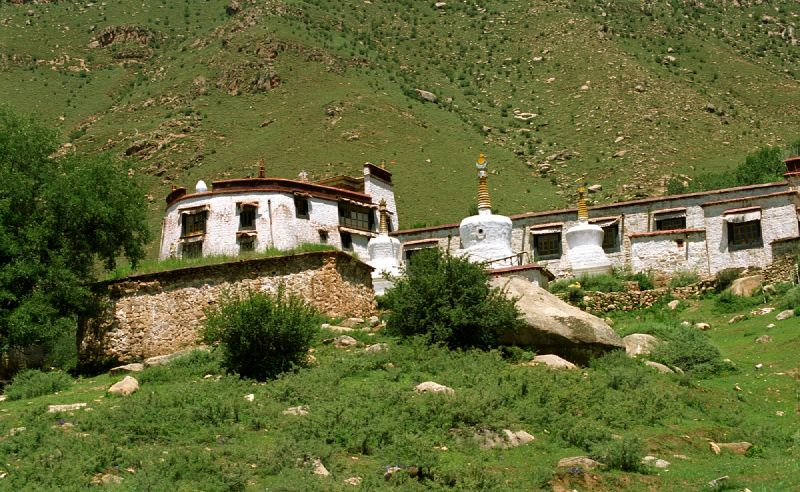
- Pabonka Hermitage

- Location within Tibet

Religion
- Affiliation: Tibetan Buddhism
- Festivals: Six-day Avalokiteśvara fasting Losar ritals Sixteen day fourth Tibetan month fasting rituals “Sixth-Month Fourth-Day” pilgrimage
- Leadership: Part of Sera Monastery today.

Location
- Location: Mount Parasol, Lhasa Prefecture, Tibet, China
- Country: China
- Interactive map of Pabonka Hermitage
- Coordinates: 29°43′11″N 91°7′06″E

Architecture
- Founder: Songtsen Gampo
- Established: 7th century

Pabonka Hermitage (Pha bong kha), also written Pawangka, is a historical hermitage, today belonging to Sera Monastery, about 8 kilometres northwest of Lhasa in the Nyang bran Valley on the slopes of Mount Parasol (Dbu gdugs ri) in Tibet.

Founded by Songtsen Gampo in the 7th century, it is currently the largest and most important of the Sera hermitages and is the starting point for the “Sixth-Month Fourth-Day” (Drug pa tshe bzhi) of the Sera Mountain Circumambulation Circuit (Se ra’i ri ’khor) pilgrimage.

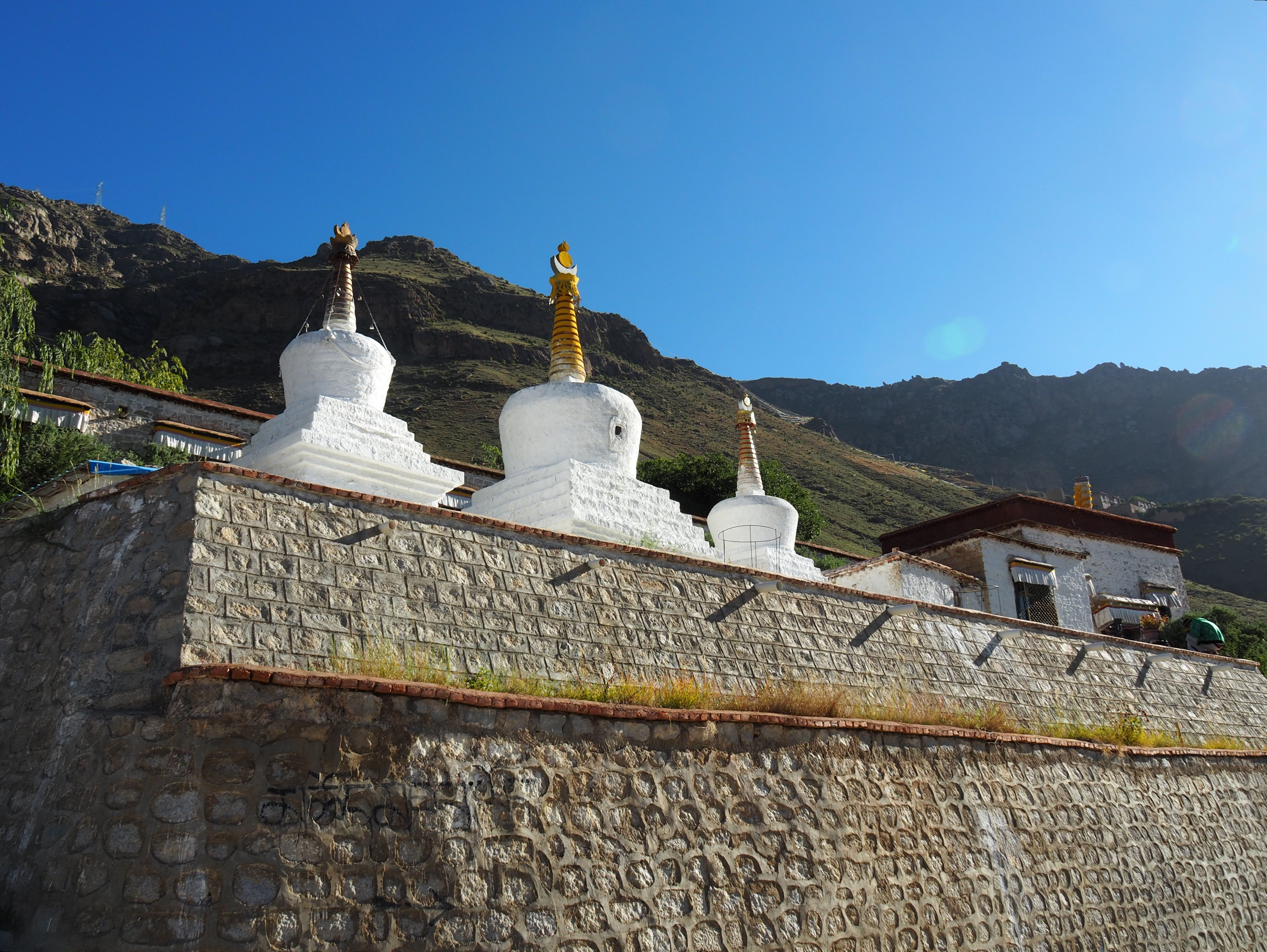
Pabonka Hermitage

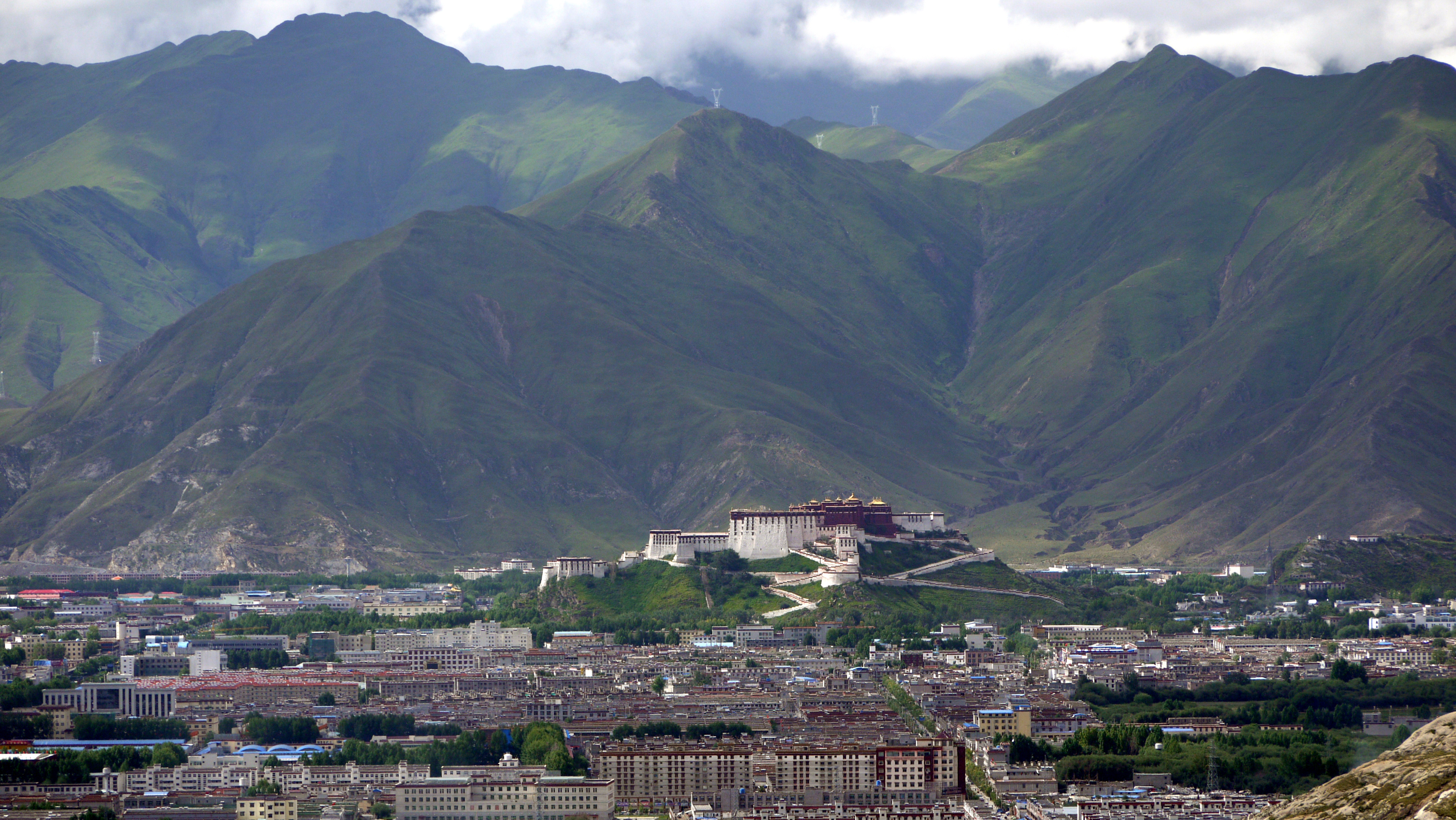
Looking towards Lhasa from Pabonka Hermitage

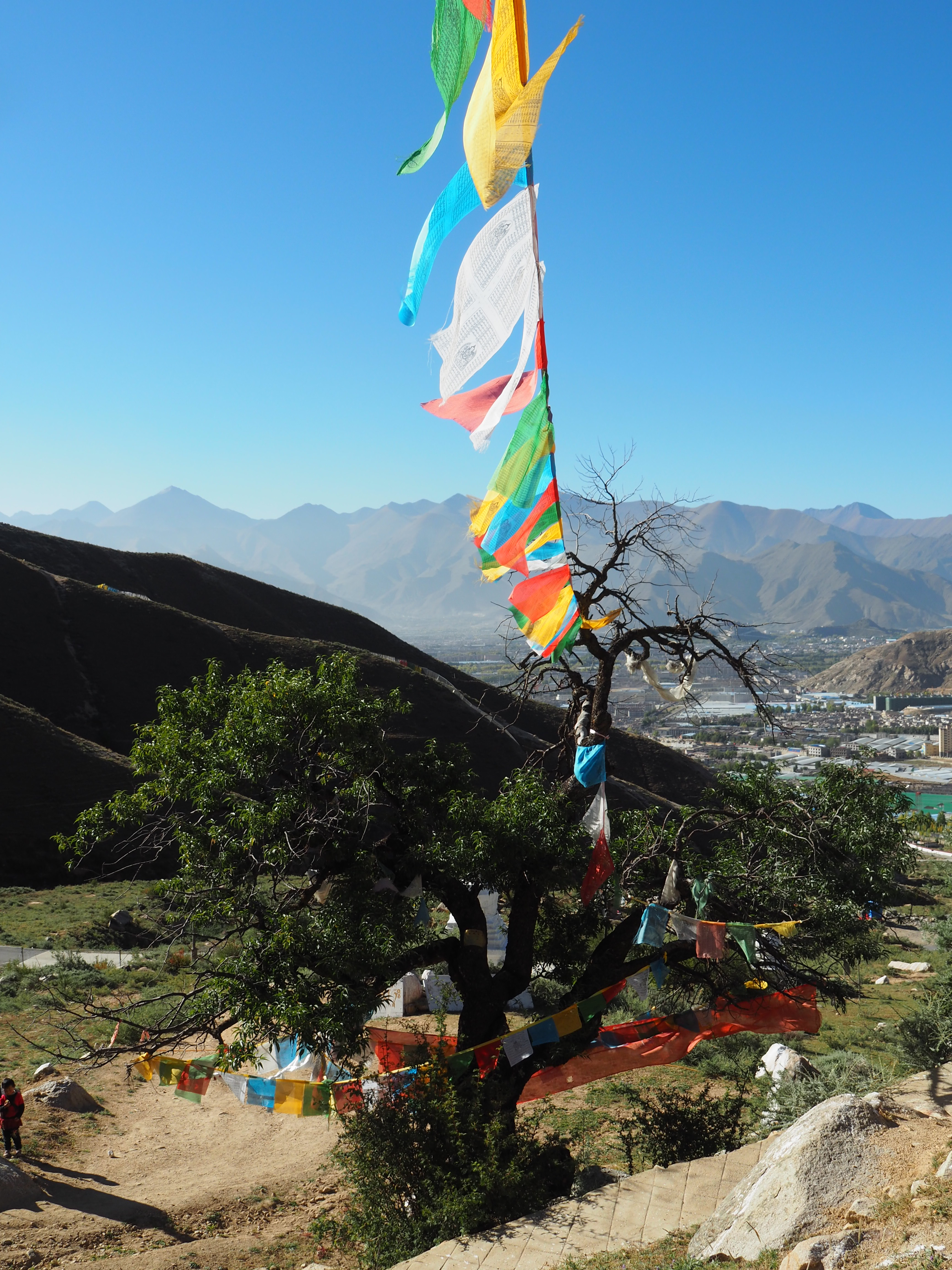
prayer flags

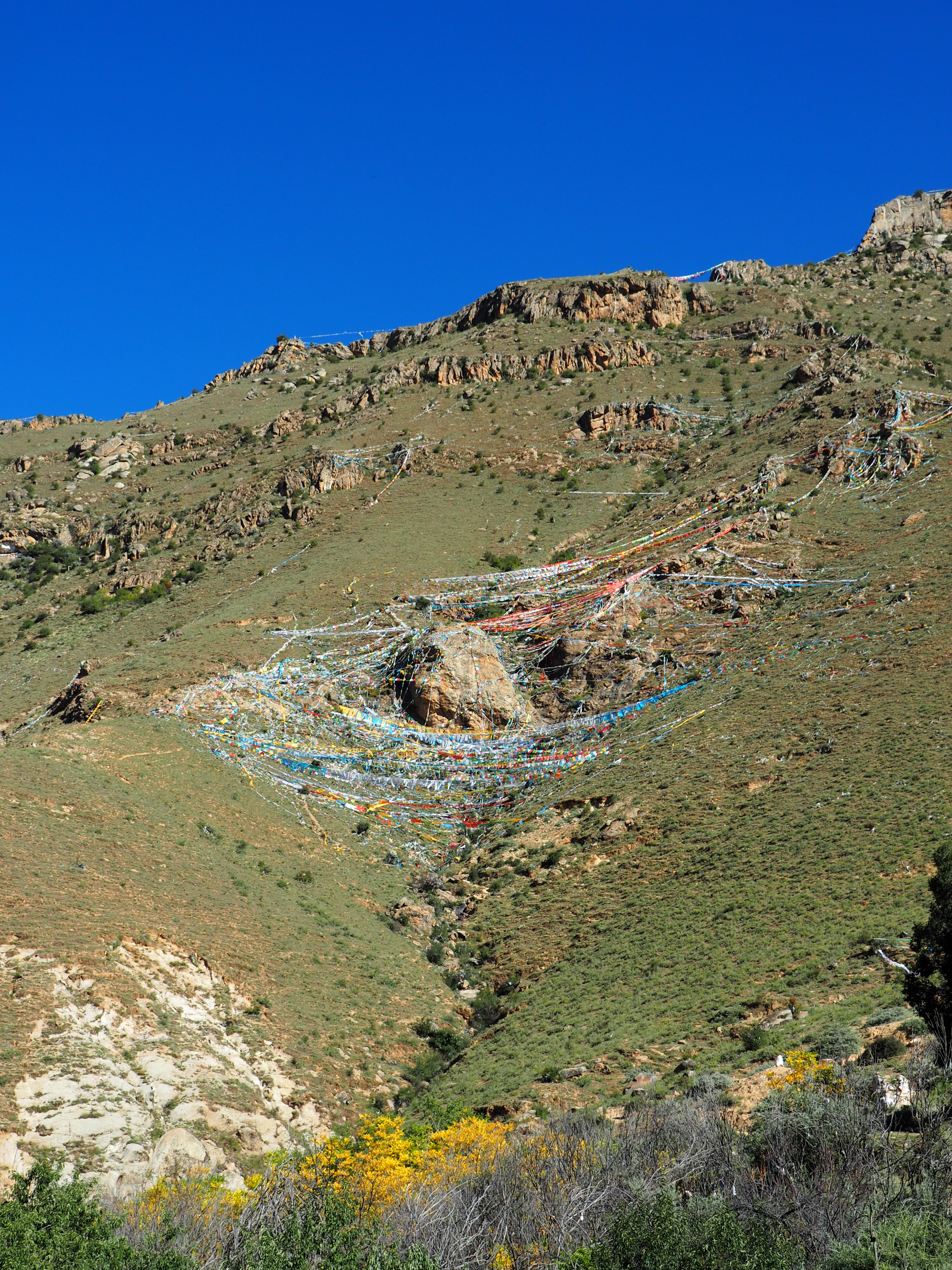

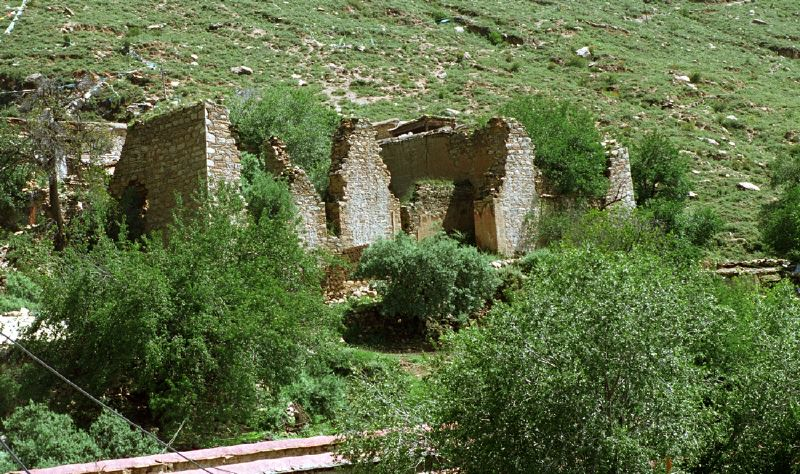
Ruins

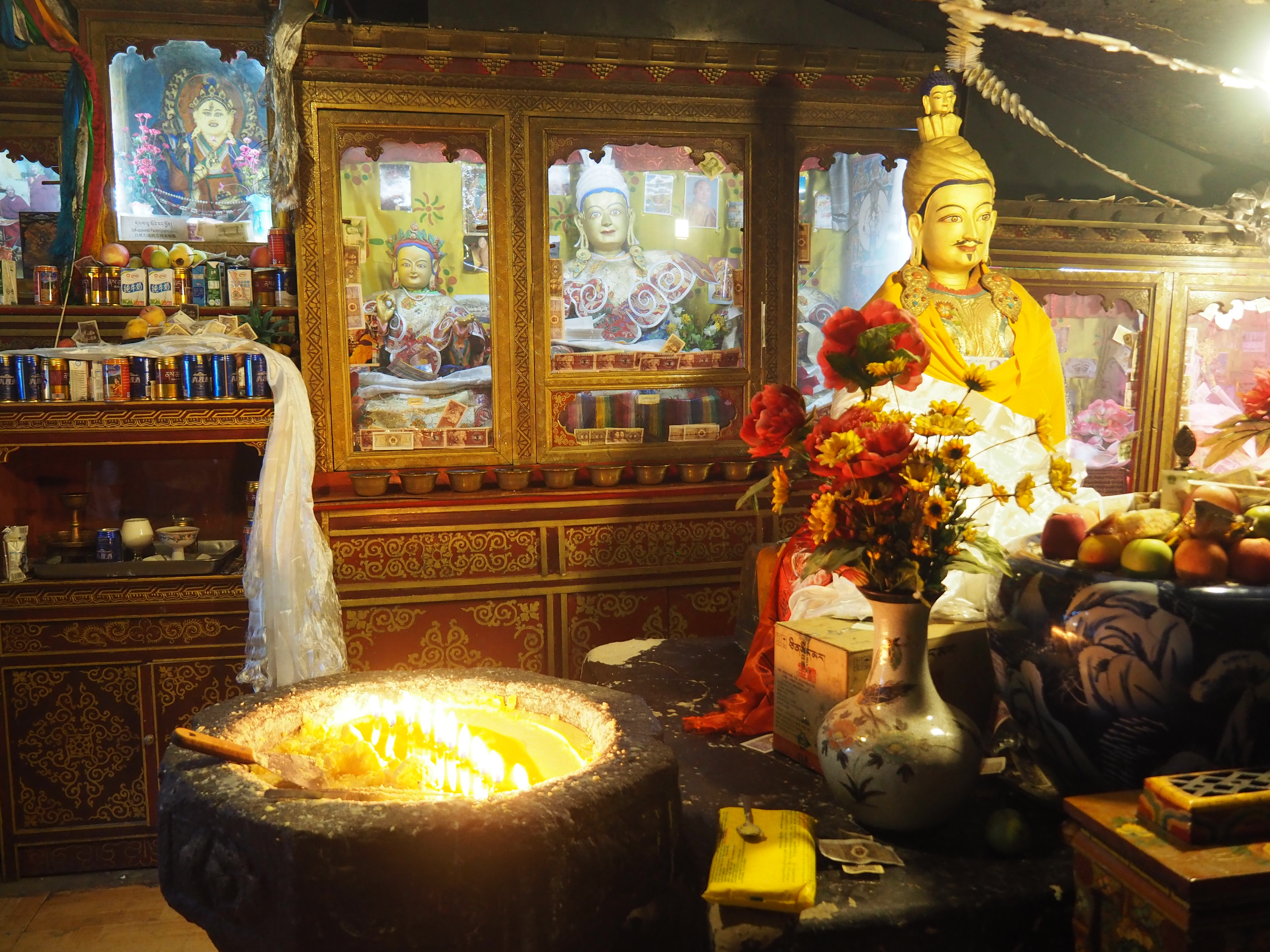

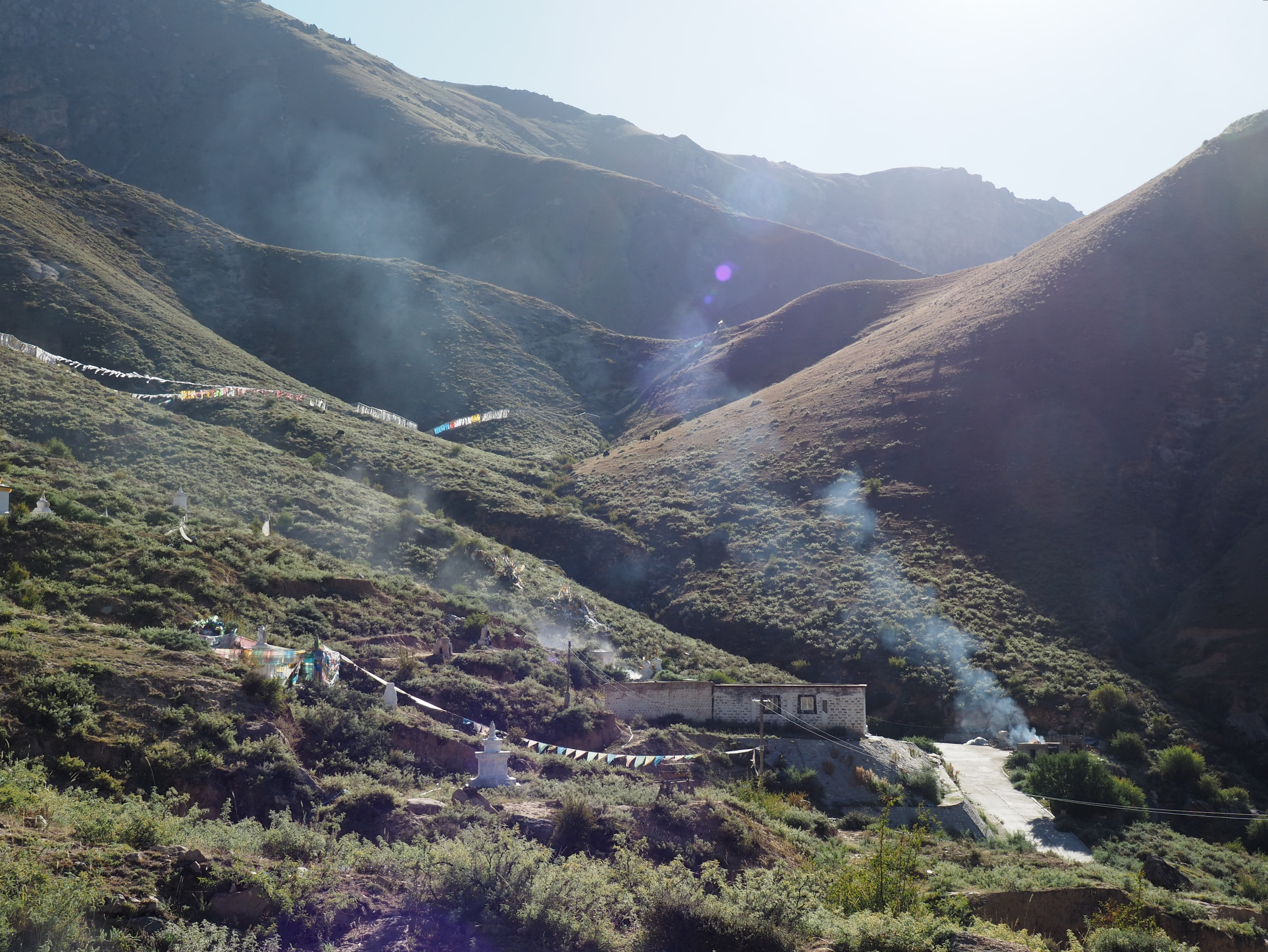
