= The Hotel on the Roof of the World =

1998 book by Alec Le Sueur

- Cover showing view of Lhasa
- Author: Alec Le Sueur
- Language: English
- Subject: Travel Literature
- Publisher: Summersdale
- Publication date: 2001
- Publication place: United Kingdom
- ISBN: 978-1-84024-199-0

The Hotel on the Roof of the World is a humorous account by Alec Le Sueur of the attempt to manage the Holiday Inn Lhasa in Tibet in the late 1980s and early 1990s. The book was published in the UK in 1998 by Summersdale and has remained in print since then.

== Background ==
The economic reform brought to China by Deng Xiaoping in 1978, known as Deng's 'open door policy' allowed tourism to develop in China. Holiday Inn opened the Holiday Inn Lido Beijing, the first international hotel in China in 1984, followed by the Holiday Inn Lhasa in Tibet in 1986. The latter opened in 1985 under local management as the newly built 'Lhasa Hotel'; when the management contract with Holiday Inn expired in 1997, the hotel returned to local management. It had been an ambitious project for Holiday Inn and the book details the difficulties of managing the hotel and the tentative opening of Tibet to the outside world in the 1980s. The book gives no detail on the political situation, but describes life for an expatriate in Lhasa and the humorous consequences of attempting to provide a Holiday Inn service in those circumstances. Reviews compared the situation to a real life Fawlty Towers.

== Editions ==
The first edition was published in 1998 by Summersdale as 'Running a Hotel on the Roof of the World' with the sub-title of 'Five Years in Tibet'. In 2001 the title was shortened to 'The Hotel on the Roof of the World' and an extra chapter and epilogue were added. The book has been reprinted several times, lately to include a quote by Michael Palin. The book was published in the US in 2003 by RDR Books with a new sub-title: 'From Miss Tibet to Shangri-La'.

Other language editions include Czech, Dutch, German, Latvian, Polish, Romanian and Spanish.
