= Nyangrain Subdistrict =

Coordinates: 29°43′11″N 91°07′06″E

Nyangrain: ཉང་བྲན (Standard Tibetan); 娘热乡 (Chinese)
- Subdistrict

Tibetan transcription(s)
  - Pinyin: Nyangrain
  - Wylie: Nyang bran

Chinese transcription(s)
  - Pinyin: Niángrè
  - Wade–Giles: Niang-je
- Interactive map of Nyangrain
- Country: China
- Province: Tibet Autonomous Region
- Prefecture: Lhasa Prefecture
- District: Chengguan District
- Time zone: UTC+8

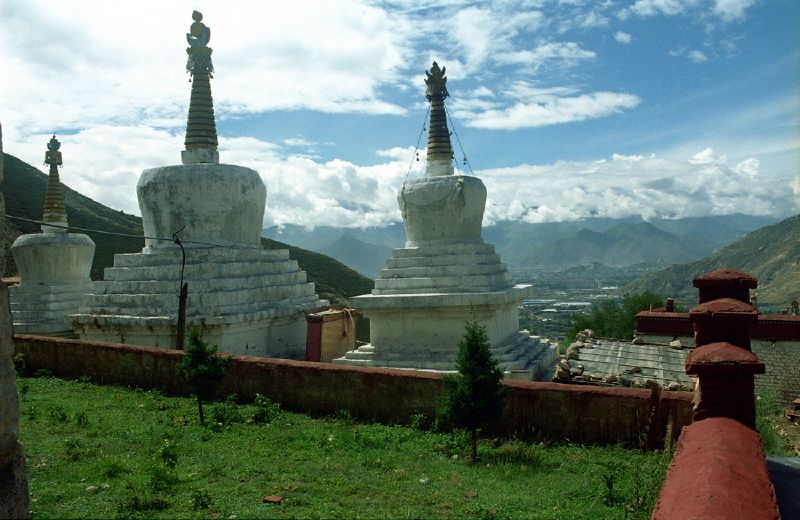
Looking down into the valley and Lhasa from Pabonka Hermitage in the Nyang bran valley

Nyang bran (Tibetan ཉང་བྲན།) is a suburb district and valley located several kilometres north of the city of Lhasa, Tibet. The valley is noted for its hermitages, belonging to the Sera Monastery, one of the three great historical monasteries of Tibet. Pabonka Hermitage, Drakri Hermitage, Chupzang Nunnery and many others are located in the valley which offers scenic views of Lhasa. Mount Parasol lies on its western side on which the Pabonka Hermitage is located.

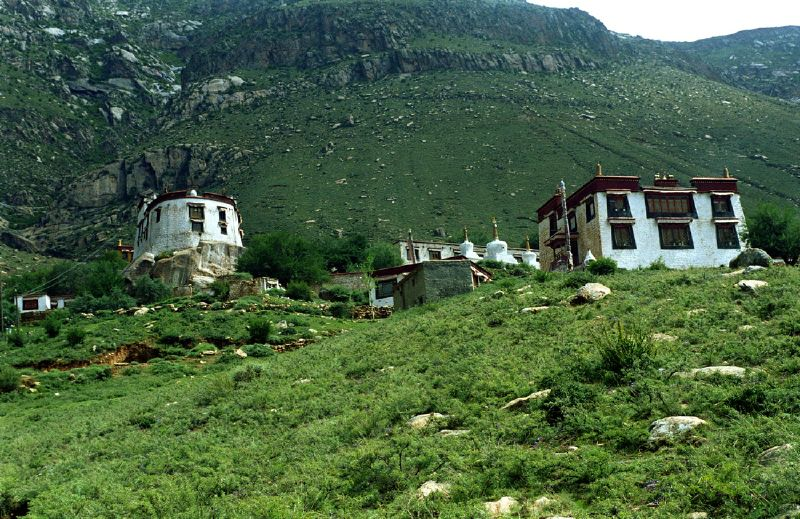
Pabonka with Mount Parasol in the background
