= Manla Water Conservancy Hub Project =

Reservoir in Tibet, China

Coordinates: 28.8467°N 89.8331°E

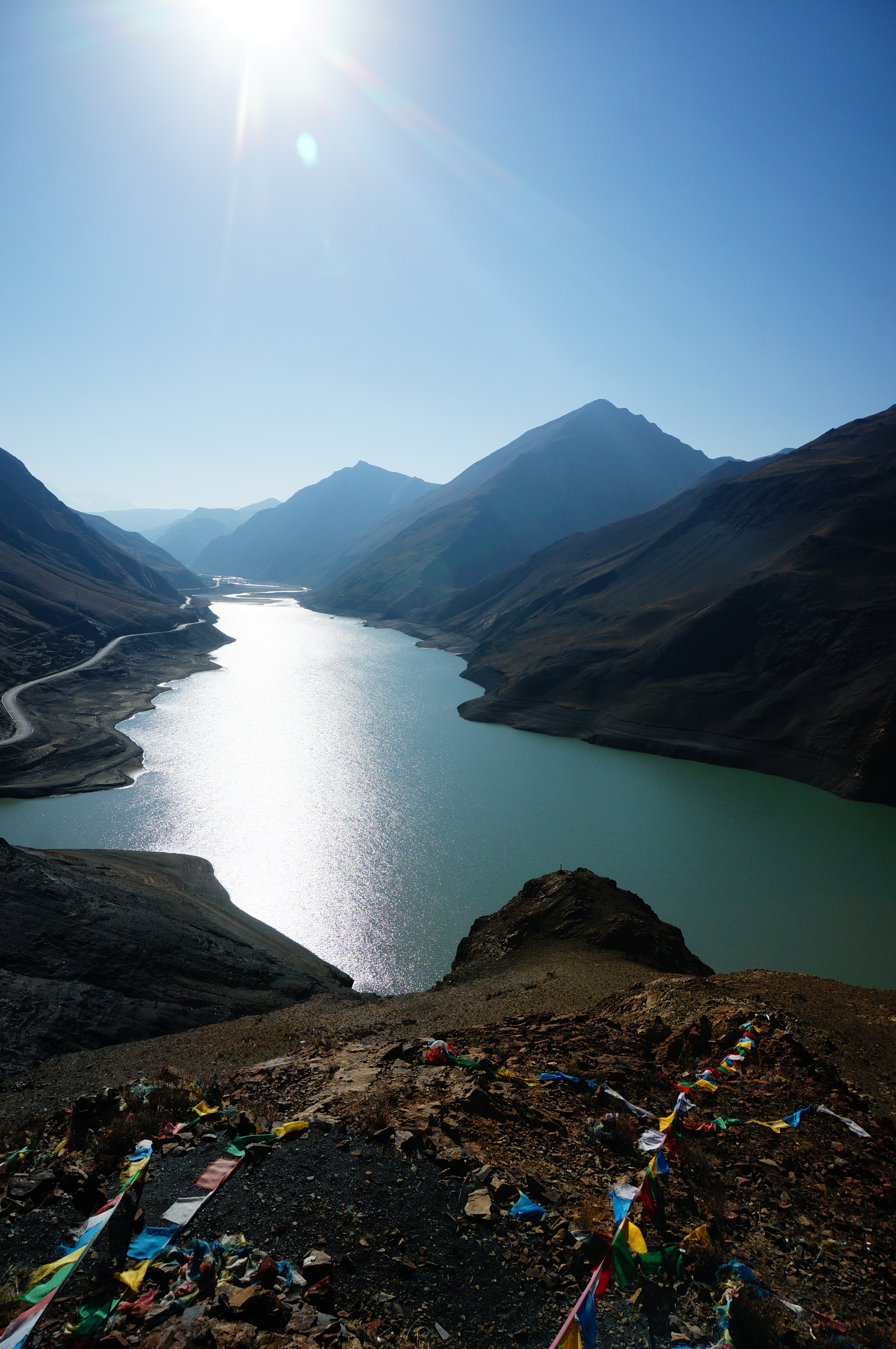
Manla Water Conservancy Hub Project

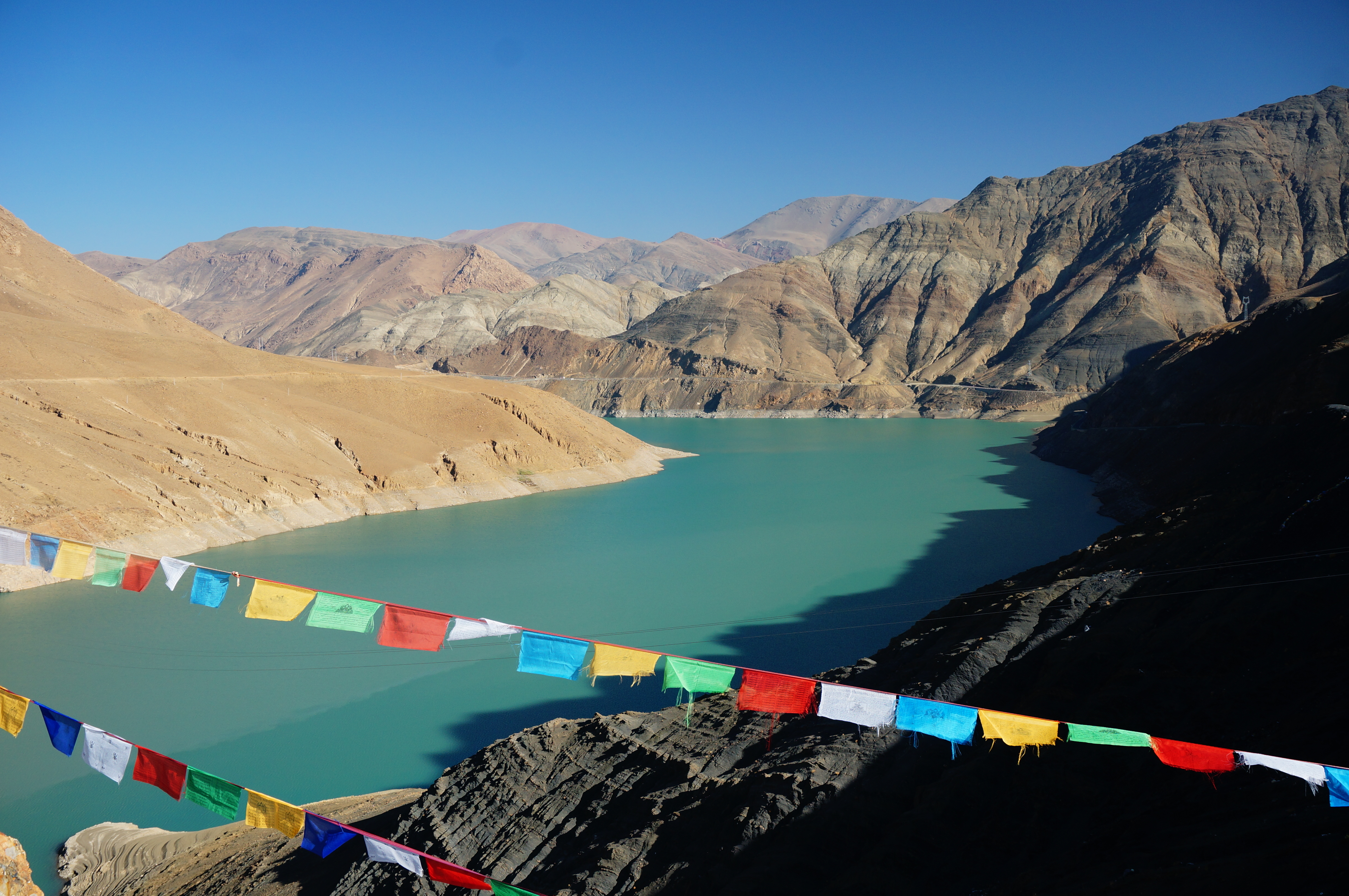
Manla Water Conservancy Hub Project

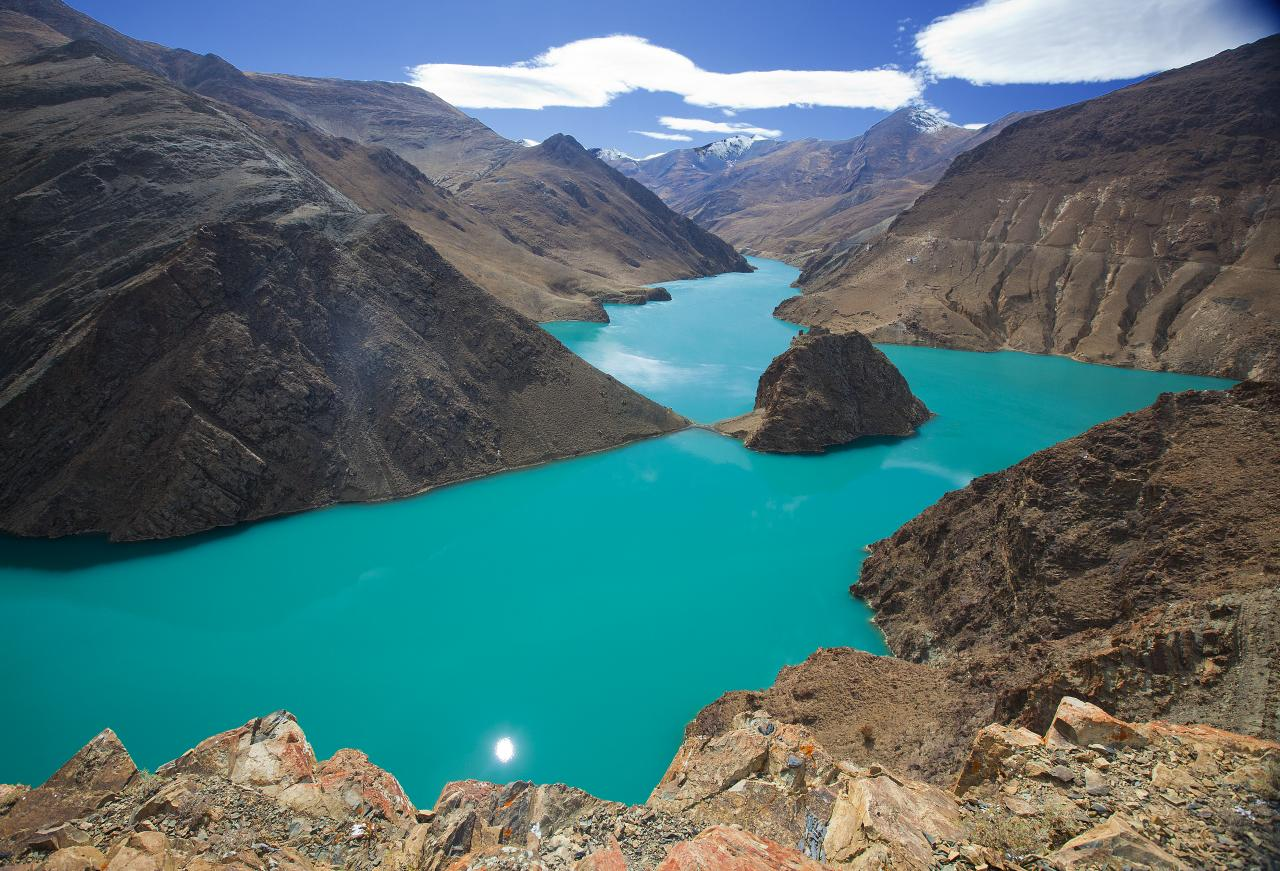
Manla Water Conservancy Hub Project

Manla Water Conservancy Hub Project (Chinese: 满拉水利枢纽工程), also Manla Reservoir (Chinese: 满拉水库), is situated in the upper sections of the Nangchu River in Longma Township, Gyantse County, Shigatse Prefecture, Tibet. This is a substantial water conservancy construction initiative that facilitates irrigation and power generation while also providing multifaceted advantages such as flood control, soil and water conservation, and tourism. It is part of the 62 Aid Projects to Tibet and represents the first large-scale comprehensive water conservancy hub project in the region.

== History ==
The Manla Water Conservancy Hub Project was initiated in April 1989 by the Ministry of Water Resources. In 1994, the Tibet Autonomous Region Water Conservancy Bureau commissioned a feasibility study, which was completed by the Northeastern Survey and Design Institute. That same year, the Ministry of Water Conservancy and the Hydroelectric Planning and Design Institute conducted a comprehensive review and granted approval. The water conservancy hub project represents the most substantial investment initiative within the Government of China's Tibet aid program, funded by the State Planning Commission and the Ministry of Water Resources, with a total investment of 960 million yuan. Construction of the project commenced in September 1994, with full-scale construction beginning in 1995. The cofferdam process was successfully sealed in November 1996, and the water diversion and power generation tunnels were inaugurated in 1997. In July 1999, the Armed Police Hydroelectric Command tasked the General Institute of Water Regulation with conducting the "Safety Appraisal of the Mangla Water Conservancy Hub Project prior to Water Storage." In September 1999, the dam filling attained the design elevation; in October 1999, the lower gate impoundment occurred. On December 18, 1999, the first power generation unit was operational. By November 2000, the main project construction was finalized. On August 19, 2001, the project underwent inspection and acceptance, confirming its completion. The administrative entity is the Tibet Manla Water Conservancy Hub Management Bureau.

== Outcomes ==
=== Electricity Generation ===
The Manla water conservancy hub project, prior to the construction of the Shigatse power grid, primarily depended on the Tang River, the Strong Wang Two hydroelectric power plant, and regional diesel power plants as the main sources of power supply, with a total installed capacity of approximately 18 megawatts. This capacity was insufficient to meet the electrical demands of industrial, agricultural, and residential activities in Shigatse, resulting in only 19.8% of households in the basin having access to electricity. Consequently, the majority of residents relied on cow dung, turf, and spiked firewood as their primary energy sources for daily living. The project aimed at addressing the electricity issue in the middle and lower reaches of the Nianchu River has been completed, alongside the construction of the hydroelectric power station, which is supported by the Sheep Lake and Manla power stations as the core of peak power supply in the development of the Tibetan power grid.

=== Irrigation ===
The Manla Water Conservancy Hub Project is situated in the Shigatse region, often referred to as the "Granary of Tibet." It lies downstream of the Nianchu River basin in Jiangzi County, which serves as the primary commercial grain production hub for the Tibet Autonomous Region. This area benefits from a favorable climate and fertile land, with the basin's population constituting 7% of the total population of the region. Additionally, the arable land, exceeding 700,000 acres, represents 21.1% of the total arable land in the region. The cultivated area for crops is 319,000 mu, representing merely 45% of the total arable land, indicating significant potential for agricultural advancement. Prior to the initiation of its project, the region's inadequate agricultural infrastructure and the limited availability of diesel power production hindered the advancement of local agriculture and animal husbandry. Currently, the construction of the Manla Water Conservancy Hub Project and Chumba Lake Reservoir (Chinese: 冲巴湖水库) provides irrigation water for 600,000 mu of farmland, forest, and grassland across three counties and one district in the Nianchu River Basin (Kangmar County, Gyantse County, Bainang County, and Sangzhuzi District), mitigating the effects of extreme weather on agricultural water utilization in the region.

=== Flood Control ===
For many years, there has been a risk of glacial lake outburst floods in the Nangchu River. The completion of the Manla Water Conservancy Hub project can mitigate the occurrence of glacial lake outbursts, heavy rainfall, and other disasters that contribute to maximum flood events. This project will enhance the flood control standards in the downstream section to a 20 to 30-year interval, thereby reducing economic losses and safeguarding local flood control safety. In 2002, the Chongba Lake Reservoir underwent acceptance of risk-reinforcement measures and was subsequently managed by the Manla Water Conservancy Hub Project Management Bureau. The Manla Water Conservancy Hub Project is located near the water confluence in Charing Township, Gyantse County.

== See also ==
- Third Symposium on Tibet Work
- 62 Aid Projects to Tibet
- Bainang Vegetable Production Base
- Laluo Water Conservancy Project
- One River, Two Rivers Project
