= One River, Two Rivers Project =

Agricultural project in Tibet, China

The One River, Two Rivers Project (Chinese: 一江两河工程), is the largest and most heavily invested comprehensive agricultural development initiative in Central Tibet, China.

The project focuses on the central watershed of the Yarlung Tsangpo and its tributaries, the Lhasa River and the Nangchu River. Located on the southern Tibetan plateau, this area stretches from Lhatse County in the west to Sangri County in the east, spanning over 500 kilometers in length and 220 kilometers in width. The entire basin covers an area of 66,500 square kilometers, accounting for 5.41% of the total land area of the Tibet Autonomous Region.

== Geography ==
The project encompasses 18 counties and municipalities, including Chengguan District, Dagzê, Lhasa, Lhünzhub County, Maizhokunggar County, Doilungdêqên, Lhasa, Qüxü County, and Nyêmo County counties in Lhasa; Gonggar, Zhanang, Qonggyai County, Naidong, and Sangri County counties in Shannan; and Shigatse, Gyantse, Bainang County, Lhatse County, Namling County, and Xaitongmoin County in Shigatse. The total population of nearly 800,000 represents one-third of the entire population of the Tibet Autonomous Region, with 93% being Tibetan and 6.6% Han Chinese.

== Project ==
The basin is located in the South Tibetan Valley (Chinese: 藏南谷地), at an altitude of 3,500 to 4,000 meters. The region experiences a plateau temperate semi-arid climate, characterized by distinct wet and dry seasons, mild temperatures, flat terrain, and a dense population. This area is Tibet's political, economic, scientific, and cultural hub, boasting rich resources in land, water, energy, minerals, and tourism. The basin includes 758,000 hectares of agricultural land, with 176,000 hectares of arable land, accounting for about 50% of the region's total arable land. The area also contains over 16,000 hectares of woodland, with a forest coverage rate of 2.4%, and 4,723,000 hectares of natural pasture, representing 8.8% of Tibet's total pasture area. The hydroelectric potential is immense, with 5,940,000 kilowatts of energy, and the region hosts 17 types of mineral resources with proven reserves. Additionally, the area is renowned for its unique cultural and natural landscapes. Due to its favorable geography, climate, and resources, this region has historically been a crucial food source for Tibet.

== Construction ==
In 1987, Tibet proposed developing the central basin of the One River, Two Rivers Project area, and by 1988, the project was recognized as a national key development zone. The State Council officially approved the comprehensive development plan in 1991, making it a significant national project during China's Eighth Five-Year Plan (1991–1995) and Ninth Five-Year Plan (1996–2000). The Central Basin Comprehensive Development Project includes initiatives in water conservancy, agriculture, animal husbandry, forestry, science and technology, as well as industrial, energy, and transportation infrastructure.

Additionally, nine reservoirs were built or reconstructed, with a total storage capacity of 47.56 million cubic meters, providing drinking water for 4,556 people and 11.73 million head of livestock. New and expanded trunk and branch canals totaling 1,336.4 kilometers increased the irrigated area by 26,000 hectares. The project also constructed new rapeseed and fodder processing plants, four county hydropower stations with a combined installed capacity of 4,700 kilowatts, and new or expanded agricultural extension stations and veterinary control stations. By 2000, grain production in the project area reached 25,800 tons, rapeseed output was 28,000 tons, meat production was 28,500 tons, milk production was 45,400 tons, vegetable output was 51,700 tons.

From 2010 to the end of 2014, the "One River, Two Rivers" region successfully completed 86,800 hectares of sand control and desertification prevention efforts, with a total investment of 252 million yuan. The project resulted in the addition of 20,800 hectares of new forestland and 51,200 hectares of new grassland in previously desertified areas.

== See also ==
- 62 Aid Projects to Tibet
- Manla Water Conservancy Hub Project
- Bainang Vegetable Production Base
