= Sangri =

Sangri may refer to the following :

- Sangri County, county in Tibet
- Sangri (village), village in Tibet
- Sangri State, a former princely state in Himachal Pradesh, India
- Prosopis cineraria, Sangri in Rajasthani language
- Temple of Sangri in Naxos, Greece
