= Dongxi =

Dongxi may refer to:

- Dongxi, Cili, Hunan
- Dongxi, Shigatse, Tibet

== See also ==
- Dongxiang (disambiguation)
