= Kangmar =

Kangmar may refer to:

- Kangmar County, Tibet
- Kangmar Town, Tibet
