= Ao Liuquan =

Chinese politician (born 1974)

- 敖刘全

Communist Party Secretary of Nyingchi
- In office September 2021 – October 2025
- Deputy: Wangdui; Bata
- Party Secretary: Sonam Tashi
- Preceded by: Ma Shengchang

Communist Party Secretary of Nagqu
- In office January 2020 – September 2021
- Deputy: Danba
- Preceded by: Sonam Tashi
- Succeeded by: Zhuang Jingsong

Mayor of Nagqu
- In office July 2016 – January 2020
- Preceded by: Sonam Tashi
- Succeeded by: Danba

Personal details
- Born: May 1974 (age 52) Guiyang, Guizhou, China
- Party: Chinese Communist Party
- Education: Central Party School of the Chinese Communist Party

Chinese name
- Simplified Chinese: 敖刘全
- Traditional Chinese: 敖劉全
Transcriptions
Standard Mandarin
- Hanyu Pinyin: áo Liúquán

Ao Liuquan (Chinese: 敖刘全; born May 1974) is a former Chinese politician who spent his entire career in southwest China's Xizang Autonomous Region. His career was notable for his long tenure in Xizang Autonomous Region, where he held leadership roles in Nagqu and Nyingchi, though it ended abruptly in October 2025 amid a disciplinary investigation by China's top anti-graft agency. He is a representative of the 20th National Congress of the Chinese Communist Party and a member of the 13th National Committee of the Chinese People's Political Consultative Conference.

== Early life and education ==
Ao was born in Guiyang, Guizhou, in May 1974, and graduated from Central Party School of the Chinese Communist Party.

== Career ==
Before entering the political arena, Ao worked at the animal defense station in Bianba County, Xizang Autonomous Region, between August 1994 and December 1995. He was deputy head of Shating District of Bianba County in December 1995, deputy head of Nimu Township in June 1996, and head of Caoka Town in March 1993. During his tenure in Nimu Township, he joined the Chinese Communist Party (CCP).

In August 2001, Ao was named acting deputy magistrate of Pasho County, confirmed in January 2002.

In February 2007, Ao was appointed executive deputy magistrate of Markam County and was admitted to standing committee member of the CCP Markam County Committee, the county's top authority. In September 2008, he became deputy party secretary, although he remained executive deputy magistrate.

In January 2009, Ao was transferred to Jomda County as executive deputy party secretary of the CCP Jomda County County Committee, but having held the position for only a year and a half.

In July 2010, Ao returned to Markam County as deputy party secretary and was elevated to the position of magistrate, the top position of a county government for the first time.

In July 2010, after a brief appointment as a member of the party group of the Qamdo Prefectural Administrative Office, he assumed the role of first party secretary of the Qamdo County Party Committee in February 2012. He later became deputy governor of the Qamdo Prefectural Administrative Office in April 2012, during which time he completed a program in Business Administration from the Sichuan Academy of Management.

In December 2012, Ao moved to Nagqu Prefecture, where he served as a prefectural party committee member and deputy mayor of the Prefecture Administrative Office. He rose to executive deputy mayor in February 2014, concurrently serving as deputy party branch secretary. In July 2016, he was promoted again to mayor, a leader of a prefecture level city for the first time. In April 2018, following administrative reforms, Nagqu transitioned from a prefecture to a city, in which he served as acting mayor and a month later installed as mayor. In January 2020, he was elevated to party secretary, the top political position in the city, his first foray into a prefectura leadership role.

In September 2021, Ao was transferred to Nyingchi and appointed party secretary.

== Downfall ==
On 31 October 2025, Ao was under formal investigation for "serious violations of discipline and law" by the Central Commission for Discipline Inspection (CCDI), the party's internal disciplinary body, and the National Supervisory Commission, the highest anti-corruption agency of China.

Government offices
Preceded by ?	Magistrate of Markam County; 2010–2012	Succeeded by Qi Yinghai
Preceded by Sonam Tashi	Mayor of Nagqu; 2016–2020	Succeeded by Danba
Party political offices
Preceded by Sonam Tashi	Communist Party Secretary of Nagqu; 2020–2021	Succeeded by Zhuang Jingsong
Preceded by Ma Shengchang	Communist Party Secretary of Nyingchi; 2021–2025	Succeeded by TBA
