= Nangchu River =

River in the People's Republic of China

Nangchu River (Chinese: 年楚河, Tibetan: མྱང་ཆུ, Wylie: myang chu), or Nianchu River, the largest tributary of the middle reaches of the Yarlung Tsangpo, is located in Samzhubzê, Shigatse City, Tibet Autonomous Region.

== Geography ==
The Nianchu River, a tributary of the Yarlung Zangbo River, originates in the northern foothills of the Himalayas in Kangma County, within the territory of Sangwang Cho (Chinese: 桑旺错). It flows through the counties and districts of Kangma, Gyantse County, Bainang County, and Samzhubzê, Xigazê, stretching 223 kilometers with a watershed area of 11,130 square kilometers. The Nangchu River meets the Yarlung Tsangpo River at Rikaze, with its upper and middle reaches encompassing the renowned city of Gyantse. The fertile and scenic watershed has long been a crucial agricultural area in Tibet, often referred to as "Tibet's Granary." It is a key focus area for the One River, Two Rivers Project (Chinese: 一江两河工程), which emphasizes agricultural development in the region.

The Manla Water Conservancy Hub Project, one of the 62 Aid Projects to Tibet, marks the initial phase of the Nangchu River Basin Development Plan.
