= Tari Mountain Pass =

High mountain pass in Tibet

- Chinese: 塔日山垭口
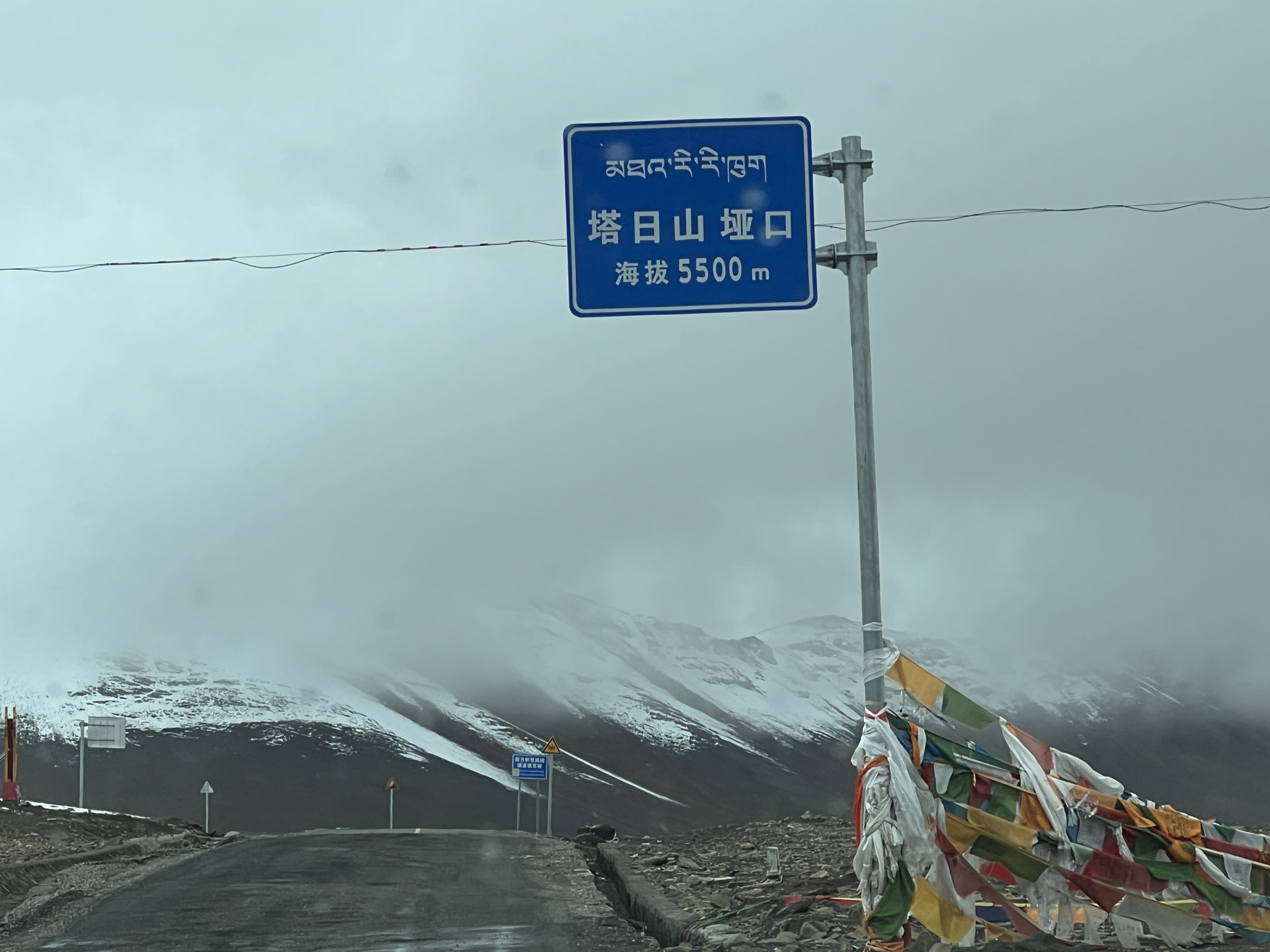
- Road sign at Tari Mountain Pass
- Interactive map of Tari Mountain Pass
- Elevation: 5,500 m (18,000 ft)
- Traversed by: China National Highway 219

Third Approach
- Location: Boundary between Nagarzê County, Shannan, and Kangmar County, Shigatse, Tibet, China
- Coordinates: 28.6786°N 90.1139°E

Tari Mountain Pass (Chinese: 塔日山垭口; pinyin: Tǎrìshān Yākǒu) is a high mountain pass in the Tibet Autonomous Region of China. It is situated on the boundary between Nagarzê County in Shannan and Kangmar County in Shigatse, and is crossed by China National Highway 219 (G219). The pass has a signposted elevation of 5,500 m (18,045 ft).

Tari Mountain is the boundary between Shigatse and Shannan. The surrounding section of G219 is affected by winter snowfall.
