= Liu Hushan =

Chinese politician (born 1967)

- 刘虎山

Mayor of Shigatse
- In office September 2015 – October 2021
- Party Secretary: Zhang Yanqing
- Preceded by: New title
- Succeeded by: Zhuo Feng

Personal details
- Born: July 1967 (age 59) Xiangtan, Hunan, China
- Party: Chinese Communist Party
- Education: Central Party School of the Chinese Communist Party

Chinese name
- Simplified Chinese: 刘虎山
- Traditional Chinese: 劉虎山
Transcriptions
Standard Mandarin
- Hanyu Pinyin: Liú Hǔshān

Liu Hushan (Chinese: 刘虎山; born July 1967) is a former Chinese politician who spent his entire career in southwest China's Tibet Autonomous Region. He surrendered himself to the anti-corruption agency of China in April 2022. Previously he served as acting secretary-general of the Tibet Autonomous Regional Committee of the Chinese People's Political Consultative Conference and before that, mayor of Shigatse.

== Biography ==
Liu was born in Xiangtan, Hunan, in July 1967.

He entered the workforce in July 1987, and joined the Chinese Communist Party (CCP) in the same year. Since February 1992, he successively worked in the Lhasa Electric Power Bureau, Tibet Autonomous Region Committee of the Communist Youth League of China, and Tibet Branch of China Youth Travel Service. Beginning in October 2003, he served in several posts in the Higher People's Court of Tibet Autonomous Region, including director of Planning, Finance and Equipment Management Division and vice president. He was made deputy secretary-general of the CCP Tibet Autonomous Region Committee in April 2012, concurrently serving as deputy director of the Chengdu Office of the Government of the Tibet Autonomous Region. In February 2014, he became deputy party secretary of Shigatse, concurrently serving as chairman of its People's Congress since December. In September 2015, he took office as mayor of Shigatse, and held that office until May 2021. In May 2021, he was named acting secretary-general of the Tibet Autonomous Regional Committee of the Chinese People's Political Consultative Conference, and served until April 2022.

=== Downfall ===
On 16 April 2022, he turned himself in and is cooperating with the Central Commission for Discipline Inspection (CCDI) and National Supervisory Commission for investigation of "suspected violations of disciplines and laws". Wangdui, a former vice governor of Shigatse Prefecture (now Shigatse), had surrendered to anti-corruption authorities on April 12.

Government offices
| New title | Mayor of Shigatse; 2015–2021 | Succeeded by Zhuo Feng |
