= Gadong =

Gadong may refer to:

- Gadong, Brunei, a commercial area in Bandar Seri Begawan, Brunei
- Gadong Station, a closed station on the Gyeongbuk Line, South Korea
- Gadong, Tibet, China
- Mukim Gadong 'A', a mukim in Brunei-Muara District, Brunei
- Mukim Gadong 'B', a mukim in Brunei-Muara District, Brunei
