= Mag Township =

Mag མག་ · 玛乡 Ma
- Township
- Location within Tibet
- Coordinates (Mag Township People's Court): 28°58′45″N 89°06′33″E
- Country: People's Republic of China
- Autonomous region: Tibet
- Prefecture-level city: Shigatse
- County: Bainang

Population (2010)
  - Total: 4,632
  - Major Nationalities: Tibetan
  - Regional dialect: Tibetan language
- Time zone: UTC+8 (China Standard)

Mag (Tibetan: མག་), or Ma (simplified Chinese: 玛乡; traditional Chinese: 瑪鄉; pinyin: Mǎ Xiāng), is a village and township in Bainang County, in the Shigatse prefecture-level city of the Tibet Autonomous Region of China. At the time of the 2010 census, the township had a population of 4,632. As of 2019, it had 11 villages under its administration.
