= Zhaxar Township =

Zhaxar བཀྲ་ཤར་ · 者下乡 Zhexia
- Township
- Location in the Tibet Autonomous Region
- Coordinates: 28°55′54″N 88°57′57″E
- Country: People's Republic of China
- Autonomous region: Tibet
- Prefecture-level city: Shigatse
- County: Bainang

Population (2010)
  - Total: 1,906
  - Major Nationalities: Tibetan
  - Regional dialect: Tibetan language
- Time zone: UTC+8 (China Standard)

Zhaxar (Tibetan: བཀྲ་ཤར་), or Zhexia (Chinese: 者下乡; pinyin: Zhěxià Xiāng), is a township in Bainang County, in the Shigatse prefecture-level city of the Tibet Autonomous Region of China. At the time of the 2010 census, the township had a population of 1,906. As of 2019, it had 7 villages under its administration.
