= Bazai Township, Bainang County =

Bazai དཔལ་ཚལ་ · 巴扎乡 Bazha
- Township
- Location within Tibet
- Coordinates (Bazai Township government): 29°10′19″N 89°08′46″E
- Country: People's Republic of China
- Autonomous region: Tibet
- Prefecture-level city: Shigatse
- County: Bainang

Population (2010)
  - Total: 5,134
  - Major Nationalities: Tibetan
  - Regional dialect: Tibetan language
- Time zone: UTC+8 (China Standard)

Bazai (Tibetan: དཔལ་ཚལ་), or Bazha (Chinese: 巴扎乡; pinyin: Bāzhā Xiāng), is a township in Bainang County, in the Shigatse prefecture-level city of the Tibet Autonomous Region of China. At the time of the 2010 census, the township had a population of 5,134. As of 2019, it had 13 villages under its administration.
