= Qunub Township =

Qunub ཆུ་ནུབ་ · 曲奴乡 Qunu
- Township
- Location within Tibet
- Coordinates: 29°03′25″N 89°12′03″E
- Country: People's Republic of China
- Autonomous region: Tibet
- Prefecture-level city: Shigatse
- County: Bainang

Population (2010)
  - Total: 3,305
  - Major Nationalities: Tibetan
  - Regional dialect: Tibetan language
- Time zone: UTC+8 (China Standard)

Qunub (Tibetan: ཆུ་ནུབ་), or Qunu (Chinese: 曲奴乡; pinyin: Qūnú Xiāng) is a village and township in Bainang County, in the Shigatse prefecture-level city of the Tibet Autonomous Region of China. At the time of the 2010 census, the township had a population of 3,305. As of 2019, it had 12 villages under its administration.
