= Qangdoi Township =

Qangdoi བྱང་སྟོད་ · 强堆乡 Qiangdui
- Township
- Location within Tibet
- Coordinates: 29°05′02″N 89°21′54″E
- Country: People's Republic of China
- Autonomous region: Tibet
- Prefecture-level city: Shigatse
- County: Bainang

Population (2010)
  - Total: 2,369
  - Major Nationalities: Tibetan
  - Regional dialect: Tibetan language
- Time zone: UTC+8 (China Standard)

Qangdoi (Tibetan: བྱང་སྟོད་), or Qiangdui (simplified Chinese: 强堆乡; traditional Chinese: 強堆鄉; pinyin: Qiángduī Xiāng), is a township in Bainang County, in the Shigatse prefecture-level city of the Tibet Autonomous Region of China. At the time of the 2010 census, the township had a population of 2,369. As of 2019, it had seven villages under its administration. The Nyang River flows to the south of the main village.
