= Düjung Township =

Düjung འདུས་བྱུང་ · 杜琼乡 Duqiong
- Township
- Location within Tibet
- Coordinates (Düjung Township Central Primary School): 29°02′05″N 89°15′07″E
- Country: People's Republic of China
- Autonomous region: Tibet
- Prefecture-level city: Shigatse
- County: Bainang

Population (2010)
  - Total: 3,192
  - Major Nationalities: Tibetan
  - Regional dialect: Tibetan language
- Time zone: UTC+8 (China Standard)

Düjung (Tibetan: འདུས་བྱུང་), or Düqiong (simplified Chinese: 杜琼乡; traditional Chinese: 杜瓊鄉; pinyin: Dùqióng Xiāng), is a village and township in Bainang County, in the Shigatse prefecture-level city of the Tibet Autonomous Region of China. At the time of the 2010 census, the township had a population of 3,192. As of 2019, it had 9 villages under its administration.
