= Luojiang, Tibet =

Luojiang ནོར་བུ་ཁྱུང་རྩེ་ · 洛江镇 Norbukyungzê
- Town
- Location within Tibet
- Coordinates: 29°06′22″N 89°15′54″E
- Country: People's Republic of China
- Autonomous region: Tibet
- Prefecture-level city: Shigatse
- County: Bainang

Population (2010)
  - Total: 7,243
  - Major Nationalities: Tibetan
  - Regional dialect: Tibetan language
- Time zone: UTC+8 (China Standard)

Luojiang (Chinese: 洛江镇; pinyin: Luòjiāng Zhèn) also transcribed from Tibetan as Norbukyungzê (Standard Tibetan: ནོར་བུ་ཁྱུང) is a town in and the seat of Bainang County, in the Shigatse prefecture-level city of the Tibet Autonomous Region of China.

== Demographics ==
At the time of the 2010 census, the town had a population of 7,243. As of 2019, it had 15 villages under its administration.
