= Gala Township =

Gala ཀ་ལ་ · 嘎拉乡
- Township
- Location in the Tibet Autonomous Region
- Coordinates (Gala Township government): 28°15′37″N 89°23′13″E
- Country: People's Republic of China
- Autonomous region: Tibet
- Prefecture-level city: Shigatse
- County: Kangmar

Population
  - Total
  - Major Nationalities: Tibetan
  - Regional dialect: Tibetan language
- Time zone: UTC+8 (CST)

Gala (Tibetan: ཀ་ལ་; Chinese: 嘎拉乡; pinyin: Gálā Xiāng) is a township of Kangmar County, Tibet Autonomous Region, China. It has four villages under its administration.

== See also ==
- List of towns and villages in Tibet
