= Gabug Township =

Gabug སྒ་སྦུག་ · 嘎普乡 Gapu
- Township
- Location within Tibet
- Coordinates: 28°45′30″N 89°08′38″E
- Country: People's Republic of China
- Autonomous region: Tibet
- Prefecture-level city: Shigatse
- County: Bainang

Population (2010)
  - Total: 1,989
  - Major Nationalities: Tibetan
  - Regional dialect: Tibetan language
- Time zone: UTC+8 (China Standard)

Gabug (Tibetan: སྒ་སྦུག་), or Gapu (Chinese: 嘎普乡), is a township in Bainang County, in the Shigatse prefecture-level city of the Tibet Autonomous Region of China. At the time of the 2010 census, the township had a population of 1,989. As of 2019, it had 5 villages under its administration.
