= Wangdain Township =

Wangdain དབང་ལྡན་ · 旺丹乡 Wangdan
- Township
- Location within Tibet
- Coordinates: 28°52′02″N 89°09′39″E
- Country: People's Republic of China
- Autonomous region: Tibet
- Prefecture-level city: Shigatse
- County: Bainang

Population (2010)
  - Total: 4,036
  - Major Nationalities: Tibetan
  - Regional dialect: Tibetan language
- Time zone: UTC+8 (China Standard)

Wangdain (Tibetan: དབང་ལྡན་), or Wangdan (Chinese: 旺丹乡; pinyin: Wàngdān Xiāng), is a village and township in Bainang County, in the Shigatse prefecture-level city of the Tibet Autonomous Region of China.

== Demographics ==
At the time of the 2010 census, the township had a population of 4,036. As of 2019, it had 10 villages under its administration.
