= Sangri, Tibet =

Sangri
- Town
- Location within Tibet
- Coordinates: 29°15′35″N 92°1′17″E
- Country: China
- Region: Tibet
- Prefecture: Shannan Prefecture
- County: Sangri County

Population
  - Total
  - Major Nationalities: Tibetan
  - Regional dialect: Tibetan language
- Time zone: +8

Sangri is a town and capital of Sangri County in the Shannan Prefecture in the Tibet Autonomous Region of China. The Yarlung Tsangpo passes near the town. Sangri is located about 99 kilometres from Lhasa.

== See also ==
- List of towns and villages in Tibet

== External links and references ==
- Wikimapia
