= Dongxiang =

Dongxiang (东乡) may refer to:

- China Dongxiang, sportswear company
- Dongxiang language, a Mongolic language
- Dongxiang people, an ethnic group of the PRC that speaks the Dongxiang language
- Dongxiang Autonomous County (东乡族自治县), Linxia Prefecture, Gansu, China
- Dongxiang District of Fuzhou City, Jiangxi, China
- Dongxiangshi (东乡氏), a Chinese surname originated from state of Song

== See also ==
- Tongxiang (桐乡), a county-level city in Zhejiang
