= Temple of Sangri =

Temple of Demeter in Naxos, Greece

- Temple of Demeter at Sangri; Sanctuary of Gyroula in Sangri
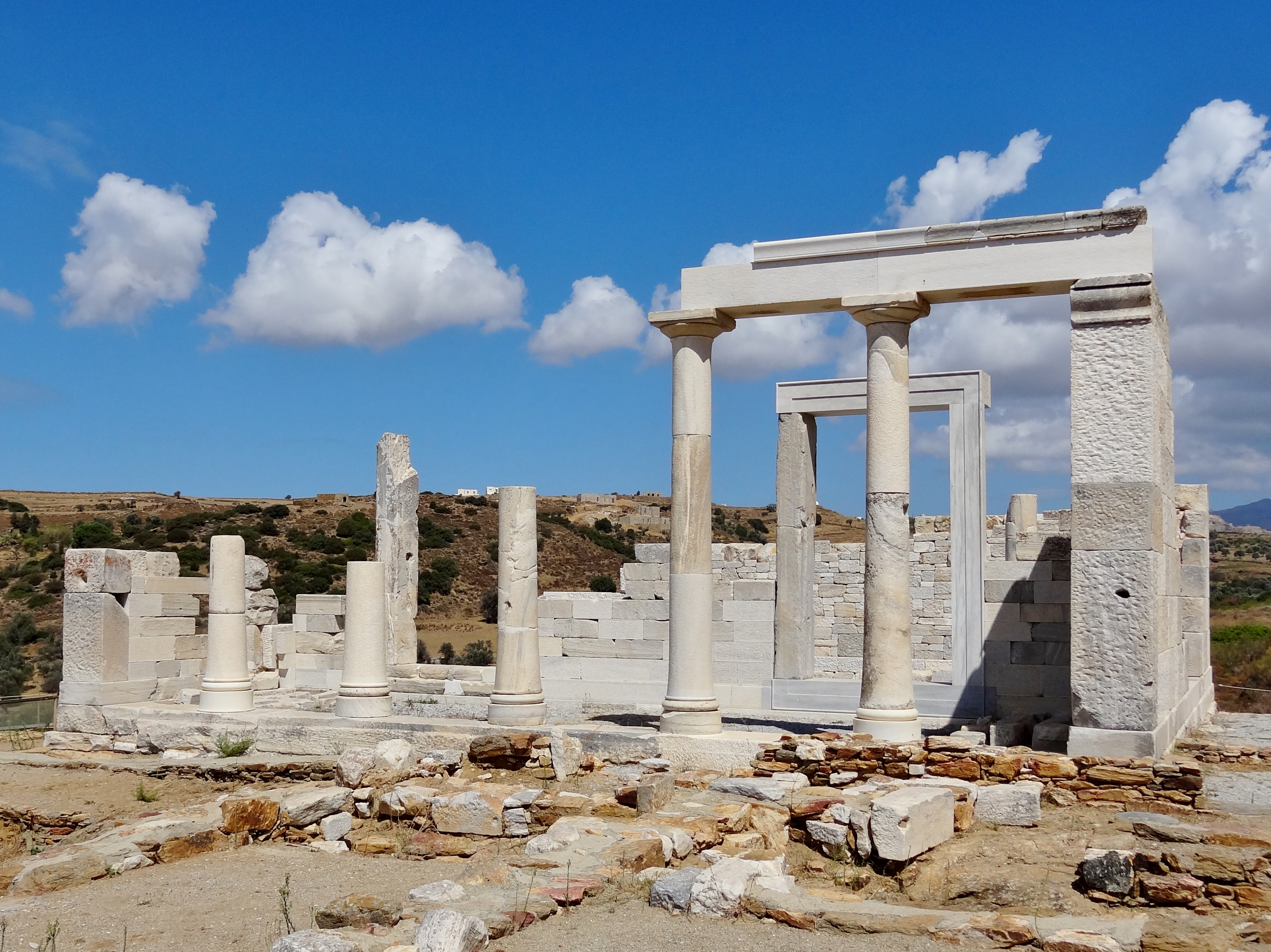
- The partially restored Temple of Sangri

- Location within Greece
- 37°1′45″N 25°25′57.2″E
- Type: Greek temple
- Periods: Archaic Greece
- Cultures: Ancient Greek
- Location: Sangri, Naxos, Greece
- Region: Cycladic Islands

History
- Built: c.530 BC
- Abandoned: 6th century AD

Site notes
- Material: Naxian marble
- Length: 13.29 m (43.6 ft)
- Width: 12.73 m (41.8 ft)
- Excavation dates: 1976-1985
- Archaeologists: Vassilis Lambrinoudakis and Gottfried Grubenas
- Condition: Restored
- Owner: Greek government
- Public access: yes

The Temple of Sangri is a Late Archaic Greek temple on the Cycladic island of Naxos in the area of Gyroulas, about 1.5 km south of Ano Sangri. The temple was built around 530 BC and is one of the earliest Ionic temples. It was built completely from Naxian marble.

== History ==
The temple was built around 530 BC. Based on the finds, the sanctuary was probably dedicated to Demeter or perhaps Kore. For this reason and because of its unusual shape, the temple is often referred to as a telesterion. There are also indications of a cult to Apollo on the site. If still in use by the 4th century AD, the temple would have been closed during the persecution of pagans under the Christian emperors. In the 6th century AD, the temple was largely demolished and a three-naved Christian basilica was built from the same stone on the same site.

== Structure ==
The temple contains many unusual features. The ground plan is almost square (13.29 x 12.73 m), when Greek temples, especially in the archaic period are usually elongated. The facade was on the south side instead of the usual location on the east or (much more rarely) west side. The temple was built without a foundation platform (the Crepidoma), directly on top of the euthynteria, likewise there is no stylobate for the columns.

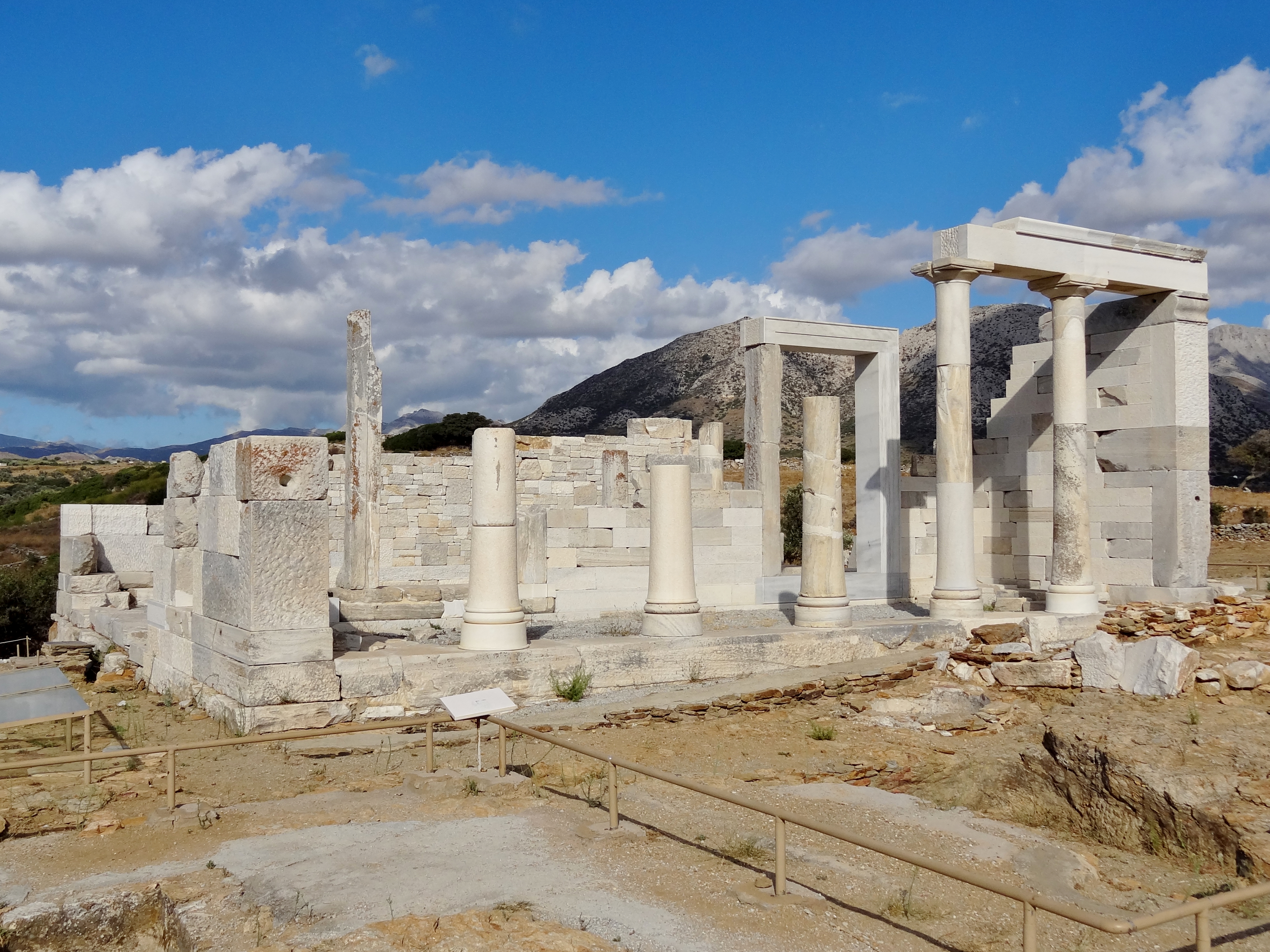

The facade was formed of five columns in antis. The columns are in the Samian style, but unfluted. Very unusually, the columns show a slight contraction in width with increasing height, whereas Archaic and Classical Greek columns as a rule increase in thickness towards the top (entasis). The leafy wreathed capitals were not carved in the round, but were instead painted onto the double echinus of the capitals, while the abacus was decorated with a band.

On the smooth architrave, hidden behind plates on the facade, were the ends of roof beams which supported the oldest known marble roof of ancient architecture, which covered the pronaos. Seven almost four meter long beams formed the purlins of this roof. The beams were curved upwards almost 2 cm, which affected all the structural elements of the roof above them, giving the roof a slight curvature.

Two doors, placed in line with the second and fifth intercolumniation, led from the entrance area to the naos. The doorway was decorated with bands lined with a large bead and reel pattern. Above the door was a painted cymatium, which supported a smooth undecorated lintel. The naos was divided into two parts by a row of five columns which were in line with the columns of the facade. The columns in the centre of the room rise to a height of 5.4 to 6.46 metres, but despite the different heights they all have the same diameter at ground level (50 cm) – in violation of the norms of archaic rules of proportion. They do not narrow towards the top. Like the facade columns they stand atop smooth Samian bases, but these have no torus. These columns supported the marble struts of a saddle roof, which ran from front to back about 4 metres in each direction. Diffuse light would have entered the naos through the gaps in the roof tiles even when the doors to the naos were closed.

The walls of the naos rested on a toichobate which was about 28 cm high and 70 cm wide and composed of two layers. While the outer layer was made of square blocks, the inner layer was made from smaller stones of irregular shape, giving it an unusual "rough" appearance. The space between these two layers was filled with rubble and marble splinters. The blocks of the outer layer show anathyrosis on the short sides, but not on the smooth long sides. The blocks were only occasionally linked with wooden dowels, mostly near the cornice. The outer layer was inclined outwards at an angle of about 3%, which, like the shape of the columns of the facade, was the opposite of the archaic norm, which was usually intended to ensure in inward inclination. The whole exterior was plastered and painted.

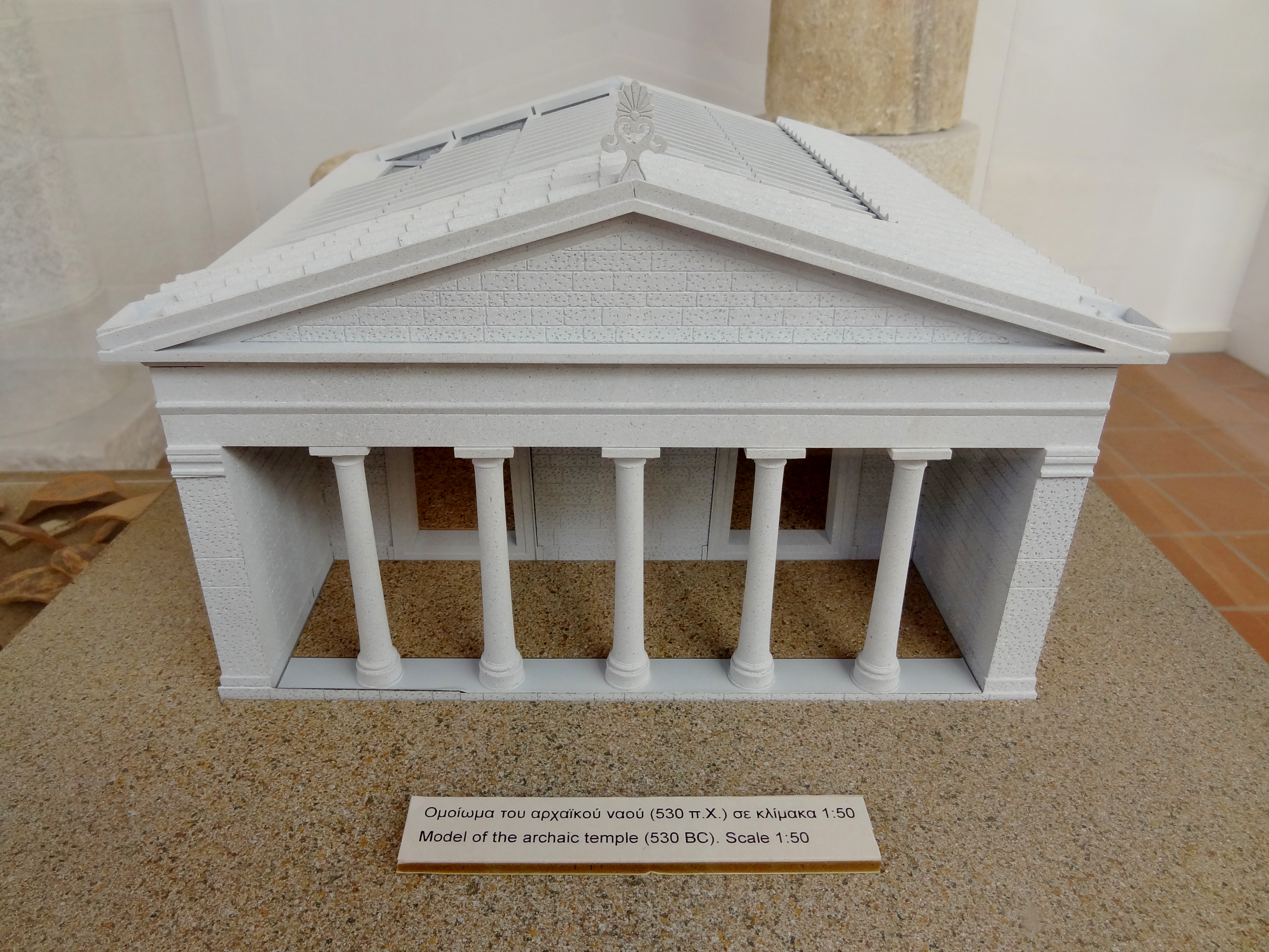
Model of the Temple

It is impressive that the whole building, which was built entirely from marble, is completely permeated by a common curvature, for which each individual part of the building had to be specially formed. This careful shaping of individual parts made the task of reconstruction easy, since the exact measurements of a large number of the 1600 or so surviving parts of the building indicated their original location.

== Excavation ==
Nikolaos Kondoleon investigated the temple in 1949. It was excavated and studied from 1976 to 1985 by Vassilis Lambrinoudakis and Gottfried Gruben as part of a partnership between the University of Athens and the Technical University of Munich. This culminated in 1994 in a partial restoration of the structure and the construction of a small museum on the site, which was opened in August 2001. A final publication of the excavations is in progress.

== Gallery ==
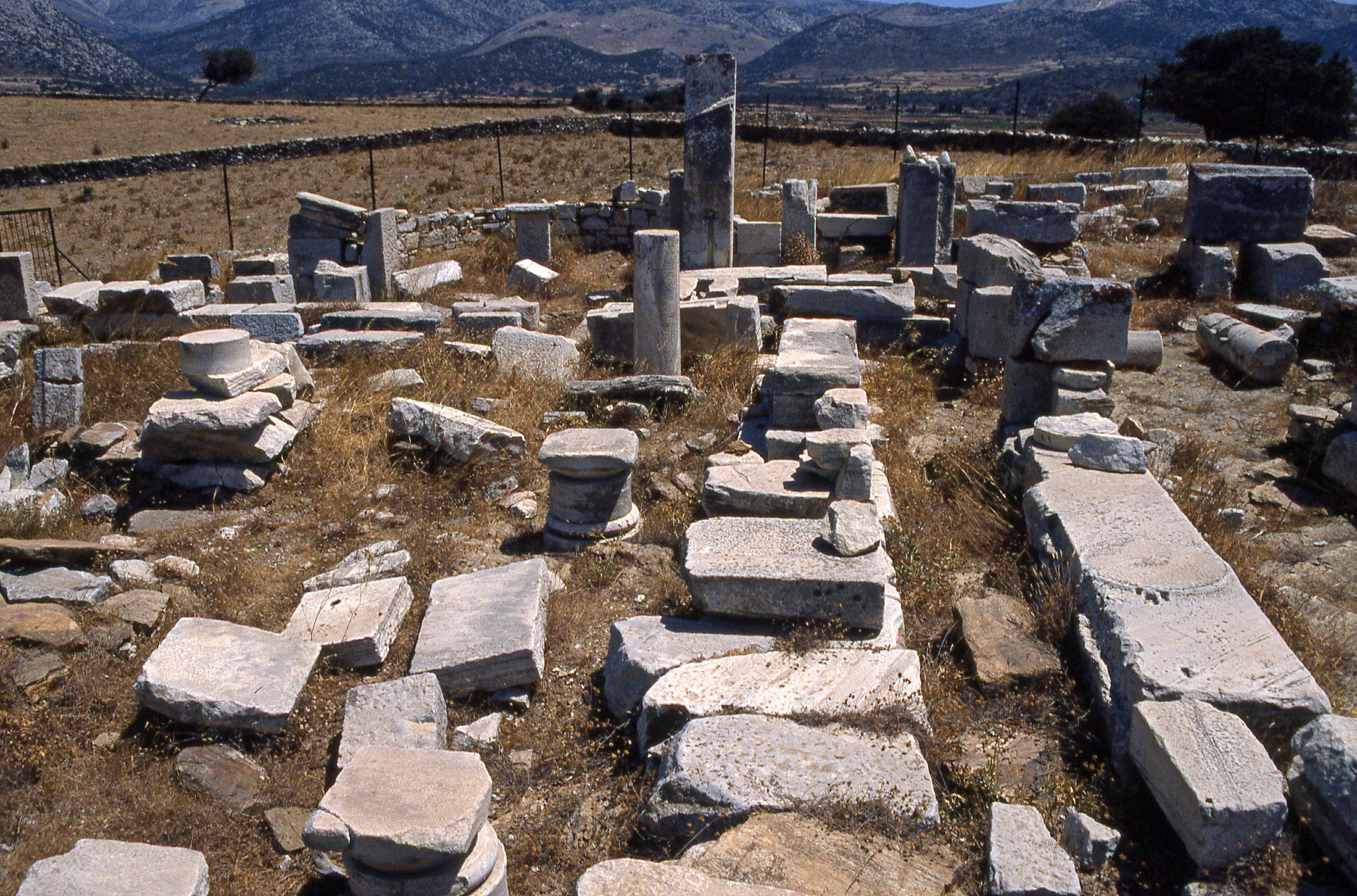
Remains of the temple and basilica before reconstruction (1988)

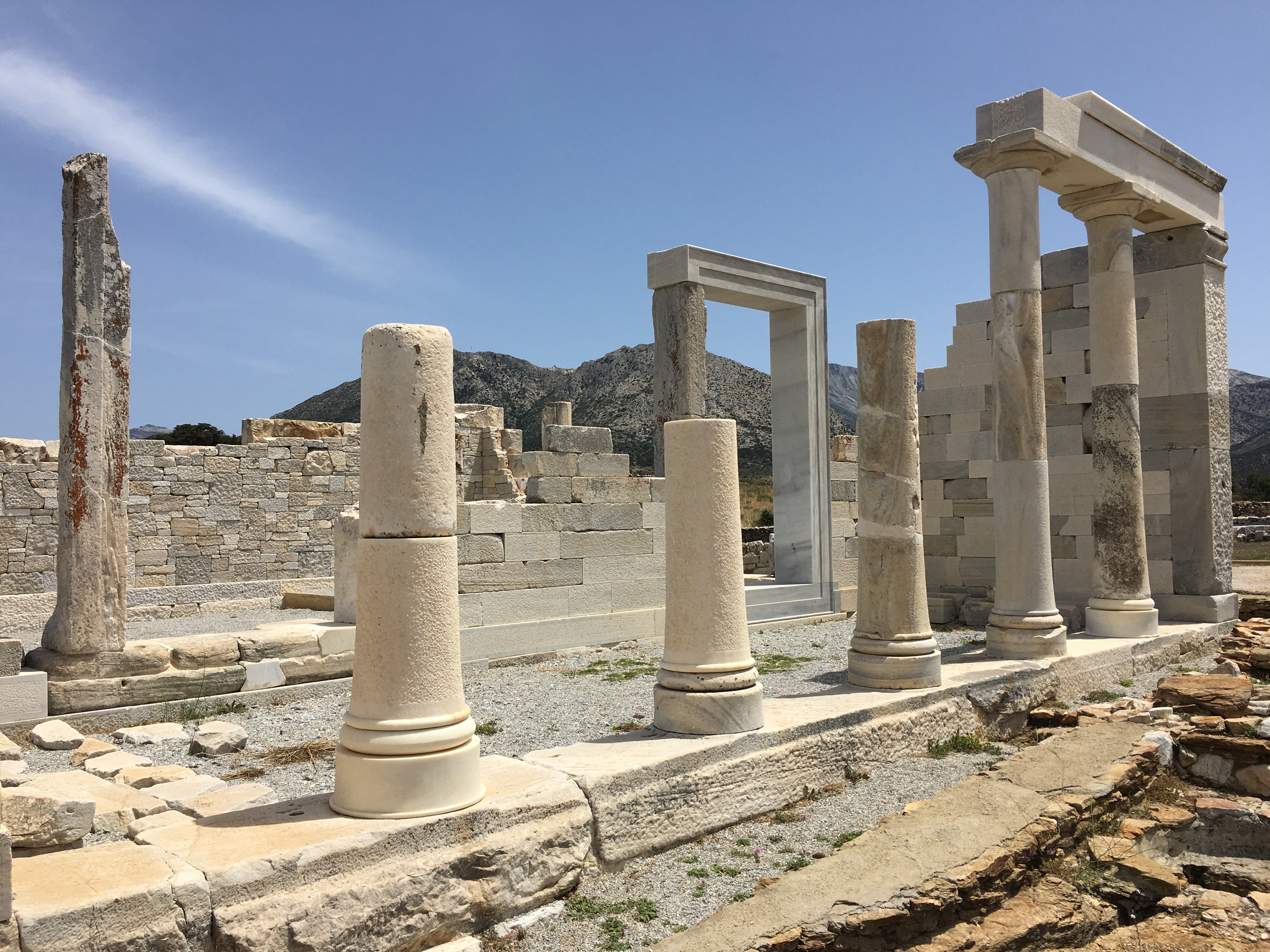
The temple after reconstruction (2016)

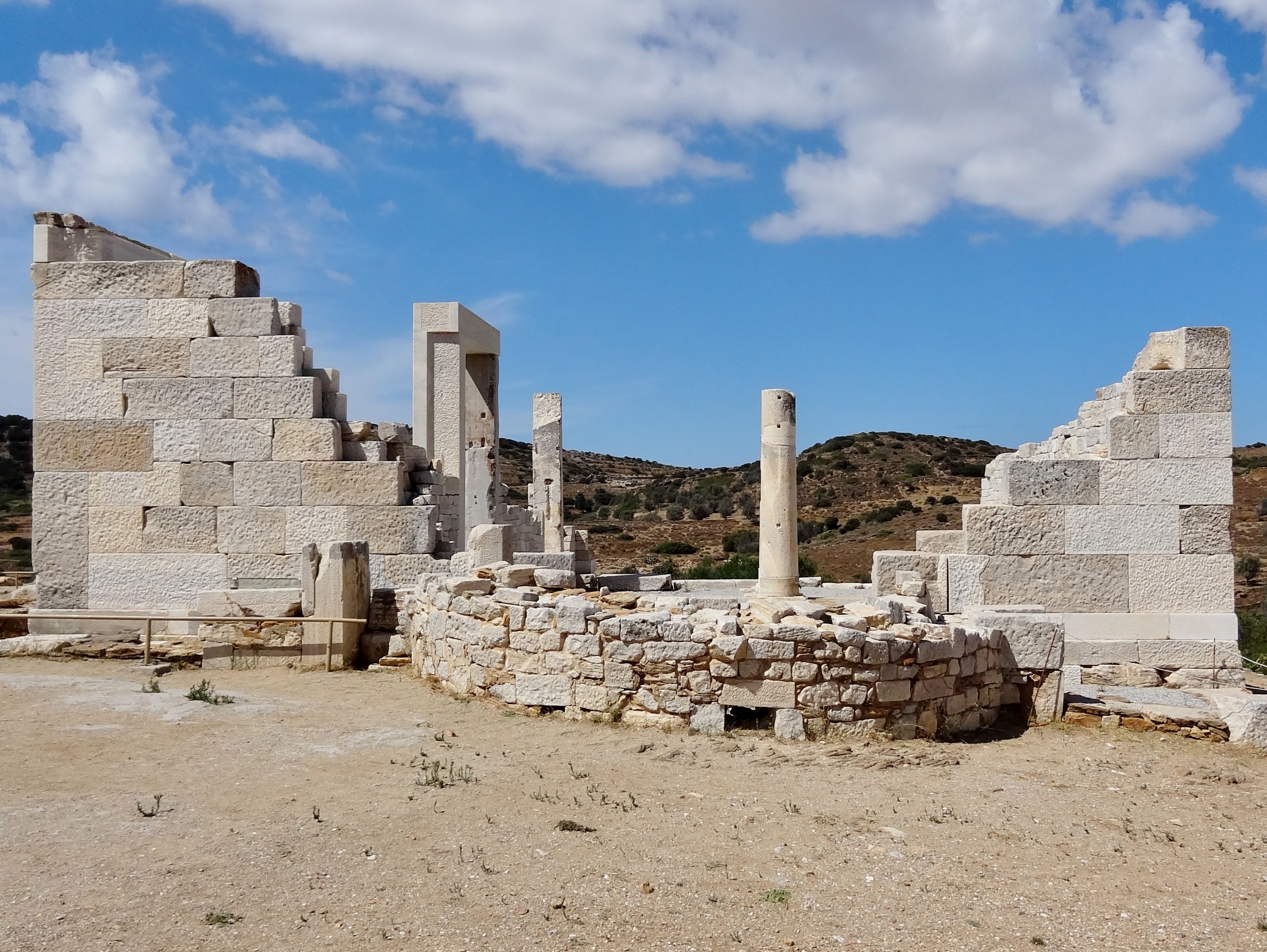
The reconstructed temple and the apse of the basilica (2013)

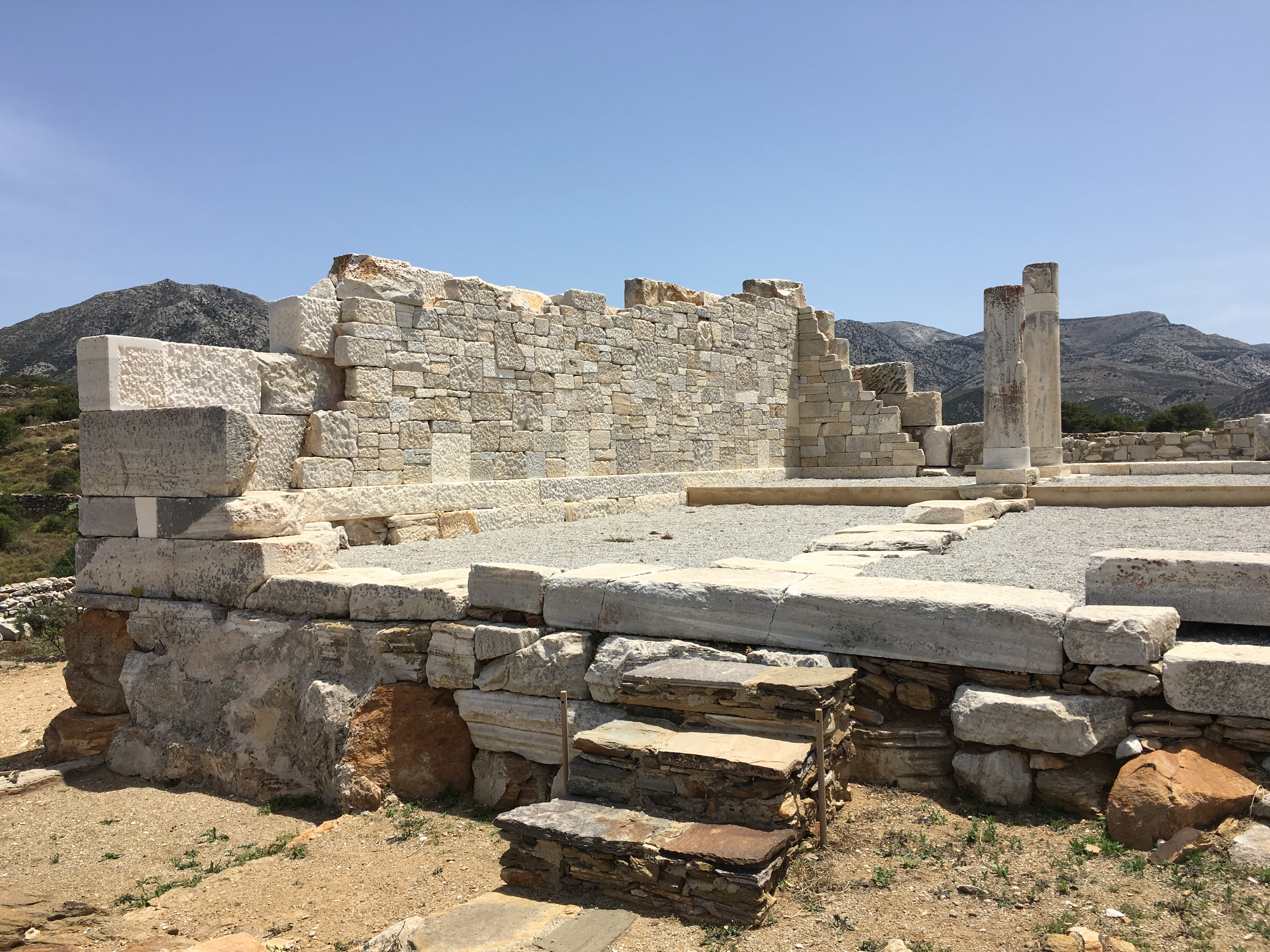
The temple after reconstruction (2016)

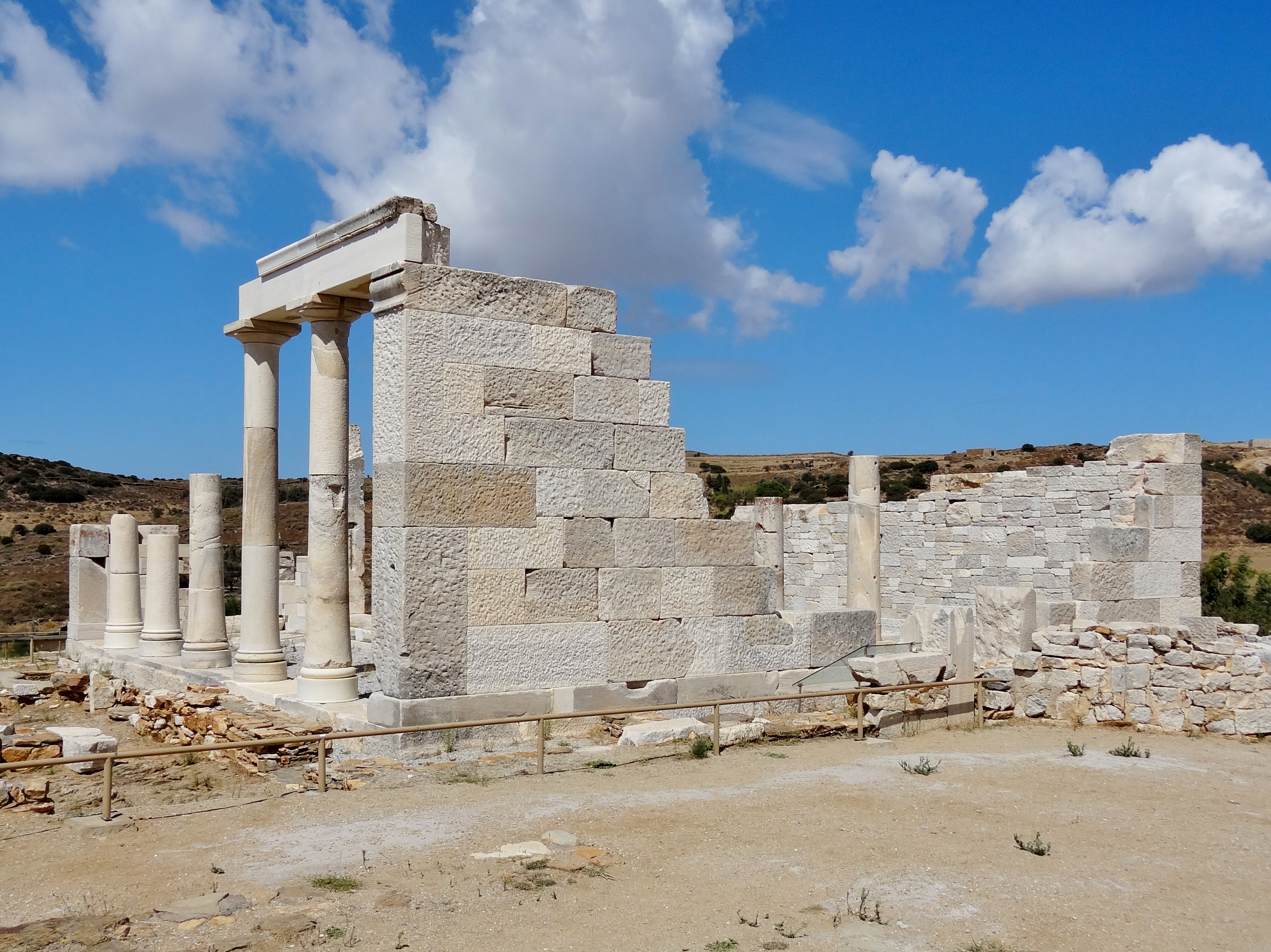
The temple after reconstruction (2013)

== See also ==
- List of Ancient Greek temples
- Architecture of Ancient Greece

== Bibliography ==
- Aenne Ohnesorg: Inselionische Marmordächer. de Gruyter, Berlin 1993, pp. 67–73.
- Manolis Korres: "Sangri di Nasso." In: Enciclopedia dell’Arte Antica, Classica e Orientale Secondo Supplemento 1971–1994 Vol. 5, Rome 1997 (Full text).
- Gottfried Gruben: "Naxos und Delos." Jahrbuch des Deutschen Archäologischen Instituts 112, 1998, pp. 261–416.
- Νάξος: το αρχαίο ιερό του Γύρουλα στο Σαγκρί. Υπουργείο Αιγαίου / Τομέας Αρχαιολογίας του Πανεπιστημίου Αθηνών, Athens 2001, ISBN 960-785934-0.
- Vassilis Lambrinoudakis, Gottfried Gruben, Aenne Ohnesorg, Manolis Korres, Themistokles Bilis, Maria Magnisali, Eva Simandoni-Bournia : "Naxos - Das Heiligtum von Gyroula in Sangri. Eine neugefundene, drei Jahrtausende alte Kultstätte der Demeter." Antike Welt 33, 2002, pp. 387–408. JSTOR 44465553
