= Gadoi =

Gadoi དགའ་སྟོད་གྲོང་རྡལ། · 嘎东镇 Gadong
- Town
- Location within Tibet
- Coordinates: 29°12′23″N 89°11′01″E
- Country: People's Republic of China
- Autonomous region: Tibet
- Prefecture-level city: Shigatse
- County: Bainang
- Time zone: UTC+8 (CST)
- Major Nationalities: Tibetan
- Regional dialect: Tibetan language

Gadoi (Tibetan: དགའ་སྟོད་གྲོང་རྡལ།), or Gadong (simplified Chinese: 嘎东镇; traditional Chinese: 嘎東鎮; pinyin: Gádōng Zhèn), is a town in the Bainang County, Shigatse City, Tibet Autonomous Region of China. As of 2019, it had 14 villages under its administration.
