= Kangmar Town =

Town in Tibet, China

Coordinates: 28°33′32″N 89°40′55″E

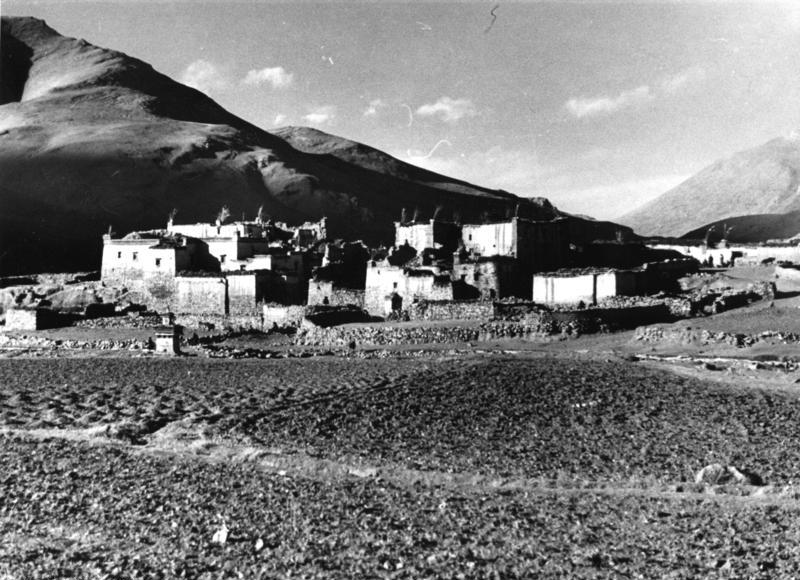
View of Kangmar. 1938.

Kangmar Town (Chinese: 康马镇) is a town in the Kangmar County of the Shigatse Prefecture in the Tibet Autonomous Region of China, at an elevation of 4,358 m (17,581 ft). It lies very close to the border with Bhutan.

== Administrative divisions ==
Some of the area's under the Kangmar Town administrative divisions include the following villiages. Chana Village, Gajiang Village, Bailong Village, Kelie Village, Kangma Village, Gelong Village, and Langda Village.
