= Laluo Water Conservancy Project =

Tibet Laluo Water Conservancy Project (Chinese: 拉洛水利枢纽), or Laluo Water Conservancy Hub and Associated Irrigation District Project, Tibet Laluo Water Conservancy Hub and Supporting Irrigation District Project (Chinese: 拉洛水利枢纽及配套灌区工程), Laluo Reservoir (Chinese: 拉洛水库), is in Laluo Township, Sa'gya County, Shigatse City, on the right bank of the Yarlung Zangbo River.

== Background ==
The Laluo Water Conservancy Project and its accompanying irrigation project are pivotal initiatives within China's "Twelfth Five-Year Plan." This represents the most substantial investment in water conservancy in Tibet's history. The primary project comprises two main components: the pivot and irrigation systems. The pivot project includes a dam, spillway structures, power stations, and irrigation diversion tunnels, with a total reservoir capacity of 296 million cubic meters.

In February 2005, the Tibet Autonomous Region finalized the Comprehensive Planning Report and proposed the planning scheme for the construction. From April 21 to 23, 2005, the General Institute of Water Resources and Hydropower Planning and Design of the Ministry of Water Resources (Chinese: 水利部水利水电规划设计总院) convened a review meeting in Beijing to evaluate the Planning Report, ultimately endorsing it and establishing a review opinion. On May 9, 2006, the Tibet Autonomous Region sanctioned the Planning Report. In October, the National Development and Reform Commission (NDRC) approved the planned scheme. Construction officially commenced on June 9, 2014. On September 30, 2016, the flow was effectively intercepted.

On December 30, 2020, the power station commenced electricity generation upon activation of the unit start button. The four major irrigation districts successfully conducted water tests, signifying the initiation of the Laluo project's advantages in power generation and irrigation. In April 2021, the trial water supply for the Laluo Irrigation District in Shigatse City, Tibet, was successfully initiated.
