= Bainang Vegetable Production Base =

Food supplier in Shigatse, Tibet, China

Bainang Vegetable Production Base (Chinese: 白朗蔬菜生产基地), located in Bainang County, Shigatse City, Tibet Autonomous Region, China, stands as the largest vegetable production base in the region and serves as a vital grain and vegetable supplier for Tibet.

== History ==
Bainang County, situated in the Nangchu River (Chinese: 年楚河) basin, is traditionally known as the "Granary of Tibet" for its highland barley and wheat production. Historically, local farmers were unfamiliar with vegetable cultivation and primarily subsisted on grains, with vegetables rarely part of their diet.

In 1995, the first group of cadres from Shandong, who were sent to support Bainang, decided to introduce modern vegetable cultivation techniques to the county. In 1998, the Bainang County government, in collaboration with cadres from Shandong, initiated a project to mobilize villagers to grow vegetables in greenhouses. They brought in 30 experienced farmers from Shandong to provide production and technical guidance. Each technician was tasked with training four local farmers, offering free greenhouses, seedlings, and ongoing technical support. This initiative boosted the enthusiasm of Tibetan farmers to learn and adopt vegetable cultivation.

By 2018, Bainang County had established 4,200 acres of new, high-efficiency greenhouse facilities. As a result, by 2020, the county's agricultural and animal husbandry output value exceeded 1.7 billion yuan, increasing the income of the local population by 425 million yuan. In 2023, Bainang County upgraded 1,640 greenhouses, constructed over 100 acres of new fruit and vegetable greenhouses, and cultivated 19,300 acres of vegetables. This resulted in a production output of 138 million pounds, generating an estimated output value of around RMB 310 million. By 2024, the local planting area is expected to expand to 14,400 acres. The region has cultivated over 140 varieties of fruits and vegetables.
