= Dongxê Township =

Dongxê སྟོང་ཤེ་ · 东喜乡 Dongxi
- Township
- Location within Tibet
- Coordinates: 28°38′38″N 89°07′24″E
- Country: People's Republic of China
- Autonomous region: Tibet
- Prefecture-level city: Shigatse
- County: Bainang

Population (2010)
  - Total: 1,114
  - Major Nationalities: Tibetan
  - Regional dialect: Tibetan language
- Time zone: UTC+8 (China Standard)

Dongxê (Tibetan: སྟོང་ཤེ་), or Dongxi (simplified Chinese: 东喜乡; traditional Chinese: 東喜鄉; pinyin: Dōngxǐ Xiāng), is a township in Bainang County, in the Shigatse prefecture-level city of the Tibet Autonomous Region of China. At the time of the 2010 census, the township had a population of 1,114. As of 2019, it had 8 villages under its administration.
