= Wangdui =

Chinese politician (born 1963)

- 旺堆

Mayor of Nyingchi
- In office June 2013 – September 2021
- Party Secretary: Zhao Shijun; Ma Shengchang
- Preceded by: New title
- Succeeded by: 巴塔

Personal details
- Born: January 1963 (age 63) Bainang County, Tibet Autonomous Region, China
- Party: Chinese Communist Party
- Education: Central Party School of the Chinese Communist Party

Wangdui (Tibetan: དབང་འདུས་, Wylie: dbang 'dus; Chinese: 旺堆; pinyin: Wàngduī; born January 1963) is a former Chinese politician of Tibetan ethnicity. He handed himself in to the anti-corruption agency of China in April 2022. Previously he served as vice chairperson of the Agricultural and Rural Committee of the Chinese People's Political Consultative Conference of Tibet Autonomous Region and before that, mayor of Nyingchi. He was a delegate to the 12th National People's Congress and is a delegate to the 13th National People's Congress.

== Biography ==
Wangdui was born in Bainang County, Tibet Autonomous Region, in January 1963. He was a high school teacher in Xigazê Prefecture between July 1984 and September 1990.

He began his political career in September 1990, and joined the Chinese Communist Party in May 1992. He served in the Compilation Bureau of Xigazê Prefecture for a short while before being transferred to the Office of the People's Government of Xigazê Prefecture in October 1994. In June 1996, he was assigned to the Office of Xigazê Prefecture Committee of the Chinese Communist Party, where he eventually became deputy secretary-general in June 1997. He was promoted to be party secretary of Namling County in October 2000, concurrently serving as chairman of its People's Congress. In July 2002, he became party branch secretary and deputy director of Xigazê Regional Development Planning Commission, and held that office until July 2005, when he rose to become vice governor of Xigazê Prefecture.

In May 2013, he was transferred to Nyingchi and appointed deputy party secretary and mayor, and served until September 2021. In September 2021, he was named acting vice chairperson of the Agricultural and Rural Committee of the Chinese People's Political Consultative Conference of Tibet Autonomous Region, confirmed in December.

=== Downfall ===
On 12 April 2021, he turned himself in and is cooperating with the Central Commission for Discipline Inspection (CCDI), the party's internal disciplinary body, and the National Supervisory Commission, the highest anti-corruption agency of China for investigation of "suspected violations of disciplines and laws".

Government offices
New title	Mayor of Nyingchi; 2013–2021	Succeeded by 巴塔
