= Sangri County =

Sangri County 桑日县 • ཟངས་རི་རྫོང་།
- County
- Location of the seat in the Tibet AR Sangri (China)
- Coordinates (Sangri County government): 29°15′34″N 92°01′04″E
- Country: China
- Autonomous region: Tibet
- Prefecture-level city: Shannan (Lhokha)
- County seat: Sangri

Area
  - Total: 2,632.18 km^{2} (1,016.29 sq mi)

Population (2020)
  - Total: 18,041
- Time zone: UTC+8 (China Standard)
- Website: www.sangri.gov.cn

Sangri County

Chinese name
- Simplified Chinese: 桑日县
- Traditional Chinese: 桑日縣
Transcriptions
Standard Mandarin
- Hanyu Pinyin: Sāngrì Xiàn

Tibetan name
- Tibetan: ཟངས་རི་རྫོང་།
Transcriptions
- Wylie: zangs ri rdzong
- Tibetan Pinyin: Sangri Zong

Sangri County (Tibetan: ཟངས་རི་རྫོང་།; Chinese: 桑日县) is a county of Shannan in the Tibet Autonomous Region, China.

It is home to Wolkha Cholung Monastery, founded as a hermitage in 1393 by Tsongkhapa.

== History ==
After the democratic reform in 1959, Sangri County was formally established as a part of Shannan Prefecture. Subsequently, Shannan Prefecture was renamed Shannan Region in 1968, and Sangri County was subordinated to Shannan Region. In 2003, the Tibet Autonomous Region was reorganized into Shannan City, and Sangri County has been subordinated to Shannan City ever since.

== Administrative divisions ==
Sangri County contains 1 town and 3 townships.

Name	Chinese	Hanyu Pinyin	Tibetan	Wylie
Town
Sangri Town	桑日镇	Sāngrì zhèn	ཟངས་རི་གྲོང་རྡལ།	zangs ri grong rdal
Townships
Zingqi Township	增期乡	Zēngqī xiāng	རྫིང་ཕྱི་ཤང་།	rdzing phyi shang
Bötö Township	白堆乡	Báiduī xiāng	འབོད་ཐོས་ཤང་།	'bod thos shang
Rong Township	绒乡	Róng xiāng	རོང་ཤང་།	rong shang
