= Bainang County =

Bainang County 白朗县 • པ་སྣམ་རྫོང་།
- County
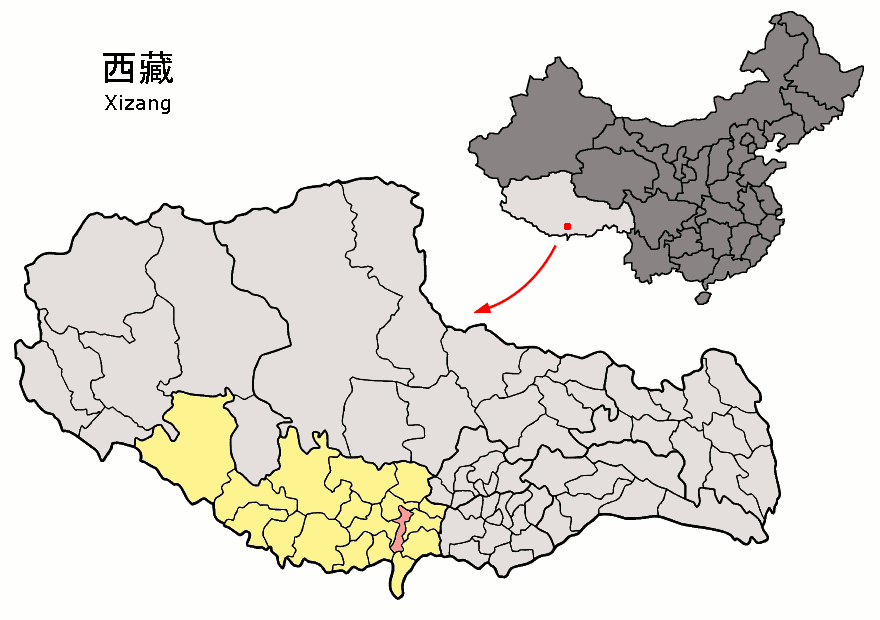
- Location of Bainang County (red) in Xigazê City (yellow) and the Tibet A.R.

- Location of the seat in the Tibet A.R. Bainang (China)
- Coordinates: 28°50′0″N 89°15′34″E
- Country: China
- Autonomous region: Tibet
- Prefecture-level city: Xigazê
- County seat: Norbu Khyungtse

Area
  - Total: 2,805.85 km^{2} (1,083.34 sq mi)

Population (2020)
  - Total: 44,564
  - Density: 15.883/km^{2} (41.136/sq mi)
- Time zone: UTC+8 (China Standard)
- Website: www.blx.gov.cn

Bainang County

Chinese name
- Simplified Chinese: 白朗县
- Traditional Chinese: 白朗縣
Transcriptions
Standard Mandarin
- Hanyu Pinyin: Báilǎng Xiàn
Yue: Cantonese
- Jyutping: baak^{6}long^{5} jyun^{2}

Tibetan name
- Tibetan: པ་སྣམ་རྫོང་།
Transcriptions
- Wylie: pa snam rdzong
- Tibetan Pinyin: Banam Zong

Bainang County (Tibetan: པ་སྣམ་རྫོང་།; Chinese: 白朗县) is a county of Xigazê in the Tibet Autonomous Region, China.

== Administration divisions ==
Bainang County is divided into 2 towns and 9 townships.

Name	Chinese	Hanyu Pinyin	Tibetan	Wylie
Towns
Norbu Khyungtse Town	洛江镇	Luòjiāng zhèn	ནོར་བུ་ཁྱུང་རྩེ་གྲོང་རྡལ།	nor bu khyung rtse grong rdal
Gadong Town	嘎东镇	Gādōng zhèn	སྒ་གདོང་གྲོང་རྡལ།	sga gdong grong rdal
Townships
Pältsel Township	巴扎乡	Bāzhā xiāng	དཔལ་ཚལ་ཤང་།	dpal tshal shang
Mak Township	玛乡	Mǎ xiāng	མག་ཤང་།	mag shang
Wangden Township	旺丹乡	Wàngdān xiāng	དབང་ལྡན་ཤང་།	dbang ldan shang
Qunub Township	曲奴乡	Qǔnú xiāng	ཆུ་ནུབ་ཤང་།	chu nub shang
Düjung Township	杜琼乡	Dùqióng xiāng	འདུས་བྱུང་ཤང་།	'dus byung shang
Jangtö Township	强堆乡	Qiángduī xiāng	བྱང་སྟོད་ཤང་།	byang stod shang
Gabug Township	嘎普乡	Gāpǔ xiāng	སྒ་སྦུག་ཤང་།	sga sbug shang
Tashar Township	者下乡	Zhěxià xiāng	བཀྲ་ཤར་ཤང་།	bkra shar shang
Tongshé Township	东喜乡	Dōngxǐ xiāng	སྟོང་ཤེ་ཤང་།	stong she shang

== See also ==
- Bainang Vegetable Production Base
