= Kangmar County =

Kangmar County 康马县 • ཁང་དམར་རྫོང་།
- County
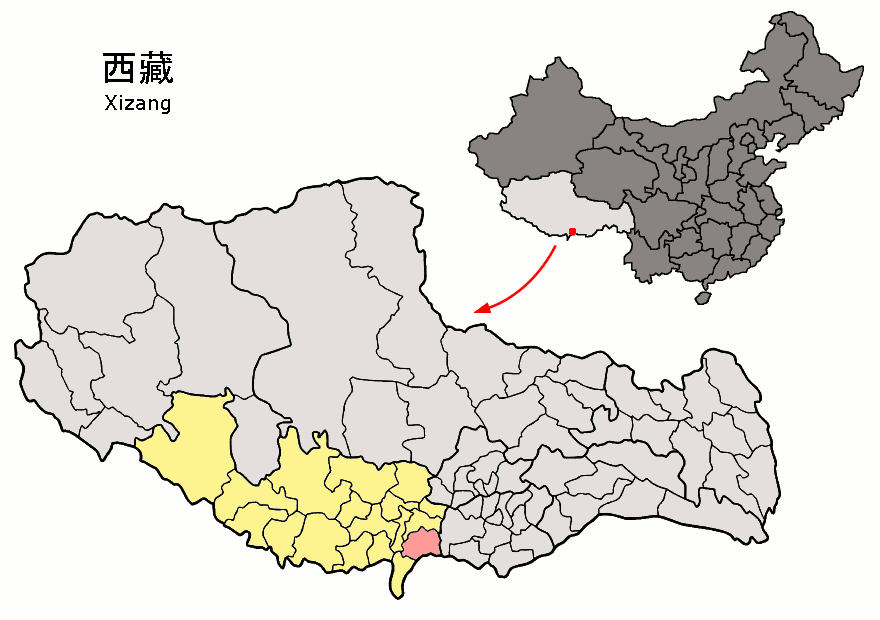
- Location of Kangmar County (red) within Xigazê (yellow) and the Tibet A.R.

- Location of the seat in the Tibet A.R. Kangmar (China)
- Coordinates: 28°16′49″N 89°20′38″E
- Country: China
- Autonomous region: Tibet
- Prefecture-level city: Xigazê
- County seat: Kangmar

Area
  - Total: 6,163.72 km^{2} (2,379.83 sq mi)

Population (2020)
  - Total: 20,864
  - Density: 3.3850/km^{2} (8.7670/sq mi)
- Time zone: UTC+8 (China Standard)
- Website: www.kmx.gov.cn

Kangmar County

Chinese name
- Simplified Chinese: 康马县
- Traditional Chinese: 康馬縣
Transcriptions
Standard Mandarin
- Hanyu Pinyin: Kāngmǎ Xiàn

Tibetan name
- Tibetan: ཁང་དམར་རྫོང་།
Transcriptions
- Wylie: Khang dMar rDzong
- Tibetan Pinyin: Kangmar Zong

Kangmar County (Tibetan: ཁང་དམར་རྫོང་།; Chinese: 康马县) is a county of Xigazê in the Tibet Autonomous Region, China, bordering India's Sikkim state to the south. Gala Co lake is located in Kangmar County.

== Administration divisions ==
Kangmar County is divided into 1 town and 8 townships.

Name	Chinese	Hanyu Pinyin	Tibetan	Wylie
Town
Kangmar Town	康马镇	Kāngmǎ zhèn	ཁང་དམར་གྲོང་རྡལ།	khang dmar grong rdal
Townships
Namnying Township	南尼乡	Nánní xiāng	གནམ་རྙིང་ཤང་།	gnam rnying shang
Sapügang Township	少岗乡	Shàogǎng xiāng	ས་ཕུད་སྒང་ཤང་།	sa phud sgang shang
Kamru Township	康如乡	Kāngrú xiāng	གམ་རུ་ཤང་།	gam ru shang
Samada Township	萨玛达乡	Sàmǎdá xiāng	ས་མ་མདའ་ཤང་།	sa ma mda' shang
Gala Township	嘎拉乡	Gālā xiāng	ཀ་ལ་ཤང་།	ka la shang
Nyêrudoi Township	涅如堆乡	Nièrúduī xiāng	ཉེ་རུ་སྟོད་ཤང་།	nye ru stod shang
Nyêrumai Township	涅如麦乡	Nièrúmài xiāng	ཉེ་རུ་སྨད་ཤང་།	nye ru smad shang
Zhontreng Township	雄章乡	Xióngzhāng xiāng	བཞོན་འཕྲེང་ཤང་།	bzhon 'phren shang
