= List of mosques in Tibet =

This is a list of mosques in Tibet.

It lists mosques (Arabic: Masjid, Lhasa Tibetan:ཁ་ཆེ་ལྷ་ཁང་།) (Note: Some Info:-: Most Tibetans call the mosque as Kache-Lhakhang(་ཁ་ཆེ་ལྷ་ཁང་།), which can be understood as "Muslim temple".; Tibetan Muslims generally call mosques as ChakTsäl-khang (ཕྱག་འཚལ་ཁང་།), which means the place/palace for salah) in Tibet, Asia.

Historically Tibet has had 11 mosques, but only 6 survive.

== List of mosques in Tibet ==
Location	Name	Image	Established	Current condition	Notes & References
Lhasa	Kha-che Glingka Mosque (Chinese: 卡契林卡清真寺)		≈1678	Existing	It have been obtained during the land granting process by the Fifth Dalai Lama.
Lhasa	Hebalin Great Mosque (Chinese: 阿坝林大清真寺)		1716	Existing	
Lhasa	Barkhor Rapsel Alley Mosque (Chinese: 饶赛巷小清真寺)		≈1900	Existing	
Lhasa	Duodigou Mosque (Chinese: 夺底清真寺)		1716	Existing	The located where the "Pilaf Festival" is held.
Lhasa	Lhasa Small Mosque		n/a	Existed in 10th century, today no longer in existence	It may have been destroyed by a civilian riot triggered by the anti-Buddhist incident of the last Tibetan king, Langdarma.
Lhasa	Tzashen Mosque (Chinese: 扎什城清真寺)		≈1733	destroyed in 1761	
Shigatse	Bang-Jia Lin-ka Mosque (Chinese: 邦加林清真寺)		c.1700 AD	Existing	
Qamdo	Qamdo Mosque (Chinese: 昌都清真寺)		1702	Existing	The original building was built in the style of the Han Chinese courtyard.
Tsetang	Zedang Mosque (Note: Add:-No. 78, Gongbu Road, Zedang Town, Naidong District, Shannan City, Tibet Autonomous Region.) (Chinese: 泽当清真寺)		N/a	recently built	See the books "No Passport to Tibet" and "Islam in Tibet: Tibetan Caravans" and folk oral accounts.
Ngari	Guge Mosque (Chinese: 古格清真寺)		n/a	destroyed in 1626	See the book "魂牵雪域: 西藏最早的天主教传教会".

== See also ==
- Religion in Tibet
- Islam in Tibet
- List of mosques in Asia
