= Barkhor Rapsel Alley Mosque =

Mosque in Lhasa, Tibet, China

- 拉萨清真小寺
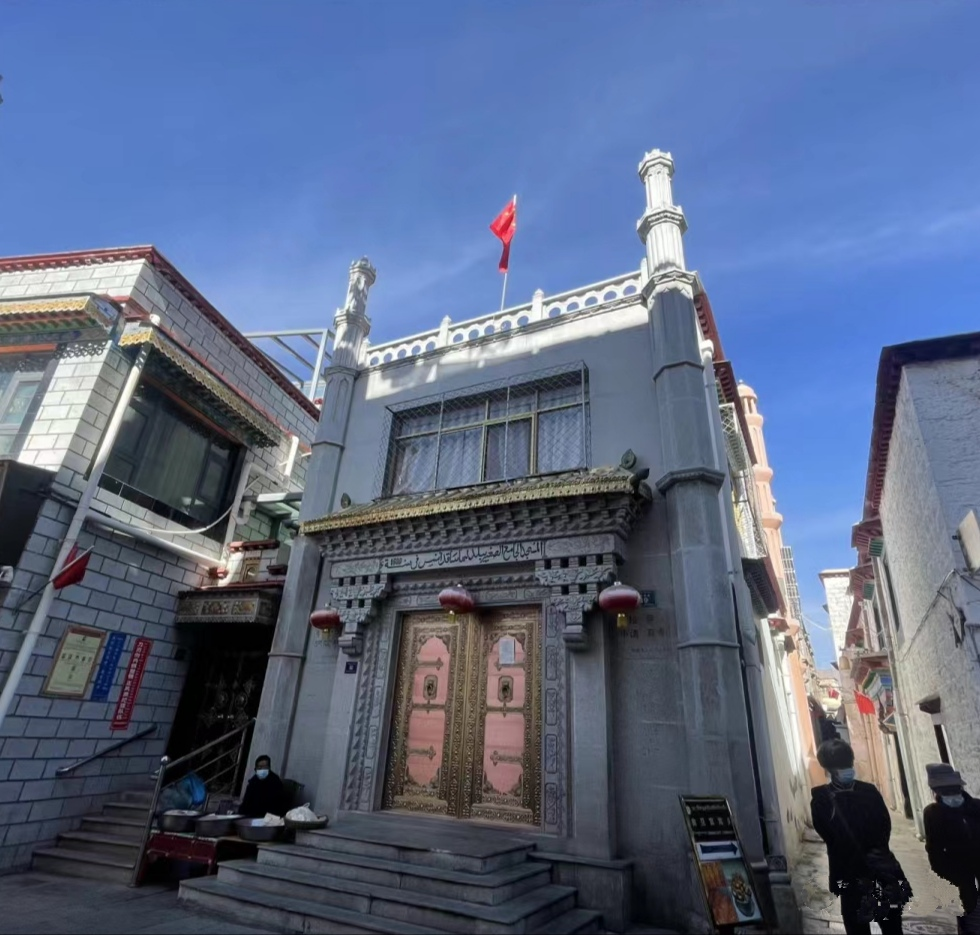
- Entrance to the Lhasa Small Mosque

- Location of the mosque in Tibet

Religion
- Affiliation: Sunni Islam

Location
- Location: Barkor (old quarter), Chengguan District, Lhasa, Tibet
- Country: China
- Interactive map of Barkhor Rapsel Alley Mosque
- Coordinates: 29°39′03″N 91°08′12″E

Architecture
- Style: Tibetan-Islamic
- Completed: 1920s

Specifications
- Length: 16 m (52 ft)
- Width: 11.8 m (39 ft)

Tibetan name
- Tibetan: ཁ་ཆེ་ལྷ་ཁང་། ཨི་སི་ལམ་ཕྱག་ཁང་
Transcriptions
- Wylie: kha che lha khang (I si lam pyag khang)

Chinese name
- Simplified Chinese: 绕赛巷清真寺
Transcriptions
Standard Mandarin
- Hanyu Pinyin: Ràosàixiàng Qīngzhēnsì

The Barkor Rapsel Alley Mosque (Chinese: 绕赛巷清真寺; pinyin: Ràosàixiàng Qīngzhēnsì), (Note: Also known as the Barkor Mosque and the Rapsel Alley Mosque (Chinese: 绕赛巷清真寺).) also often called locally as the Lhasa Small Mosque, is an early-20th-century mosque, located in Barkor, the old Tibetan quarter of the Chengguan District, in the urban heart of Lhasa, in the Tibet Autonomous Region of China. The mosque serves the local Khache community—Tibetan Muslims integral to the city’s cultural heritage.

== History ==
According to Lhasa Cultural Relics Annals (《拉萨文物志》), the Lhasa Small Mosque was constructed during the 1920s by Muslim merchants from Kashmir, Ladakh, Bhutan, Nepal, and British India who were active in trade in Lhasa. Before the construction of the mosque, Muslim worship activities were held at the Muslim base and prayer hall in the Kashmiri Muslim settlement in the western suburbs of Lhasa.

The Small Mosque maintained close ties with the mosques and Muslim cemetery located in the Kashmiri settlement of the western suburbs, particularly the Kagilinka Mosque (also known as Qiangda Kang Mosque). Both sites were administered historically by the descendants of foreign Muslims living in Tibet. While the Kagilinka mosques served as the place for daily prayers and festival gatherings, the Lhasa Small Mosque—due to its convenient location near the commercial center of Barkhor Street and the former Nepalese Consulate in Lhasa—became the main site for Friday congregational prayers (Jumu'ah) and religious assemblies.

=== Earlier Origins Hypothesis ===
The Russian Buryat Mongol explorer and Tibetologist Gombojab Tsybikov described the presence of a distinct Muslim prayer place in southern Lhasa and a Muslim cemetery west of the city around 1900, in his book "A Buddhist Pilgrim to the Holy Places of Tibet". He noted that Kashmiri Muslims maintained their own religious customs, festivals, and circumcision traditions separate from local Tibetans. The "prayer place in southern Lhasa" is generally identified as the Lhasa Small Mosque, suggesting that the mosque may have been established earlier than the 1920s.

British traveler Spencer Chapman also mentioned the mosque in his book "Lhasa: The Holy City", noting the presence of Muslim merchants living in the southeastern quarter of the city, where they had their own small mosque.

== Administration ==
Historically, the mosque was managed by an organization known as the Panjī (Persian: پنجی, lit. 'Five'). Before 1959, the mosque community elected a leader called the Kaqibenbu (Muslim headman), whose appointment required approval from the Dalai Lama's government. The Kaqibenbu then selected four additional members to form the Panjī governing council. Under them were six further officers responsible for property, mosque affairs, accounting, and finances, making a total of eleven administrators. The Kaqibenbu was rotated every three years.

== 20th Century Developments ==
Before the 1958–1959 reforms, the Muslim community associated with the Lhasa Small Mosque included over 200 households and more than 2,000 individuals of foreign Muslim descent. During the nationality registration campaigns of 1959, most chose Indian or Nepalese citizenship and subsequently emigrated, while a smaller number chose Chinese nationality and continued to manage the mosque.

During the Cultural Revolution (1966–1976), the mosque suffered damage, religious artifacts and plaques were destroyed, and the mosque was closed as part of the “Four Olds” campaign. However, because of its proximity to the Nepalese Consulate, Nepalese Muslims were eventually permitted to pray there, and when the Great Mosque of Lhasa was occupied by a local street committee, both Nepalese Muslims and local Muslim residents used the Small Mosque for worship. As a result, the mosque played a significant role in preserving Islamic practice in Lhasa during this period.

== See also ==
- Islam in Tibet
- List of mosques in Tibet
- Kashmiri Muslims
