= Sera Utsé Hermitage =

Tibetan Buddhist hermitage near Lhasa, Tibet, China

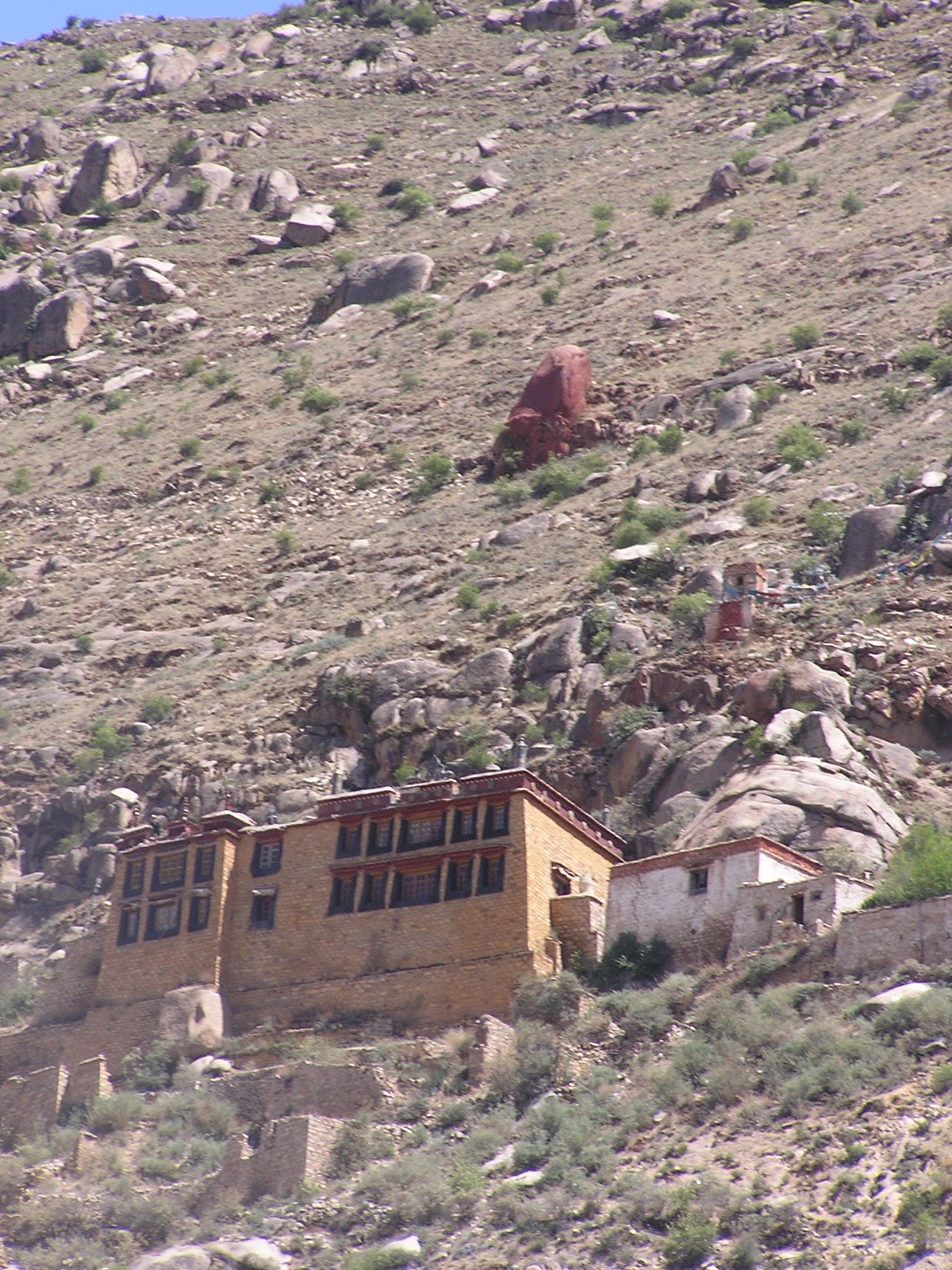

- Location within Tibet

Religion
- Affiliation: Tibetan Buddhism

Location
- Location: Lhasa Prefecture, Tibet, China
- Country: China
- Interactive map of Sera Utsé Hermitage
- Coordinates: 29°43′33.6″N 91°10′4.8″E

Sera Utsé Hermitage, Sera Utse, Sera Ütse, Sera Tse or Drubkjang Tse is a historical hermitage belonging to Sera Monastery. It is located on the mountain directly behind Sera Monastery itself, which is about 5 kilometres (3.1 mi) north of the Jokhang in Lhasa, Tibet Autonomous Region of the People's Republic of China. It is older than Sera Monastery.

It is about a 1½ hour walk up the hill from Tsongkhapa's hermitage or Choding Khang, which is just above the Assembly Hall of Sera Monastery. It has a two-storied chapel and monks' quarters with views over the city of Lhasa. There is a protector shrine to Pehar (a Tibetan spirit which belongs to the gyalpo class) and Shri Devi.

== Topology ==
The word se ra dbu rtse is also spelt as se ra rtse, which literally means 'Sera Peak.'

== Geography ==
The hill peak behind the Sera Monastery to its north is known as Sera where a number of small hermitages (ri khrod) are located. The hills are also known as Pubuchok Mountains. The hermitage, at an altitude of 13,300 feet (4,100 m), hugging the hill slopes, is located very close to the Sera mountain peak. There are two trails which lead to other hermitages. To the east of the Pubuchok mountains, in Lhasa, the Sera Utsé Hermitage, the Ragachok and Purbuchok Hermitages, are located in the higher reaches of the Dodé Valley. The west track leads to the Tashi Choling hermitage in the Pawangka valley. The white granite rocks of the hills here get heated and give off a strong glare, making it a tough climb from the Sera Monastery needing adequate precautions.

Desert conditions prevail on the southwestern face of the trail (which gets heated during summer) where lizards and Himalayan griffon vultures flying above are a common scene. The climbing is through granite rock hills from Sera to the hermitage, through willow tree-lined path, circling Gyelchen Kukar (where there is small temple) and passing through the Choding Gon.

== History ==
The known history of the hermitage is traceable to the fourteenth century only when the Buddhist guru Tsongkhapa (1357–1419) lived here in retreat in the meditation huts or sgrub khang or caves (two monks live here now). The name: sgrub khang means 'retreat house.' It was during late seventeenth or early eighteenth century that Sgrub khang dge legs rgya mtsho (1641–1713) lived here and he was called "the man from the sgrub khang," or Sgrub khang pa. As the founder, he made it his retreat on the advice of the abbot of the Sera Jé college (Grwa tshang byes) of Se ra, Jo ston bsod nams rgyal mtshan. He lived here for many years in meditation and led an ascetic life. He was recognized posthumously among the first incarnation of bla ma lineages of Sera. Many of his disciples who lived here also became equally renowned and they founded or served as the head lamas (gnas kyi bla ma) of important Sera-affiliated retreat centres. Two notable names mentioned are of Phur lcog ngag dbang byams pa (1682–1762) and Mkhar rdo bzod pa rgya mtsho (1672–1749).

It is also noted that Sgrub khang pa also founded two other hermitages in these mountains, as practice centres (sgrub sde), namely the Purbuchok Hermitage (Phur lcog ri khrod), which had one hundred monks and the Rakhadrak Hermitage (Ra kha brag ri khrod), which housed twelve monks.

Post 1959 revolution

The original large hermitage was mostly destroyed during the 1959 revolution. During this wanton destruction, the temple was gutted and frescoes were defaced with white paint. Later, a small part of the hermitage was refurbished.

== Structures ==
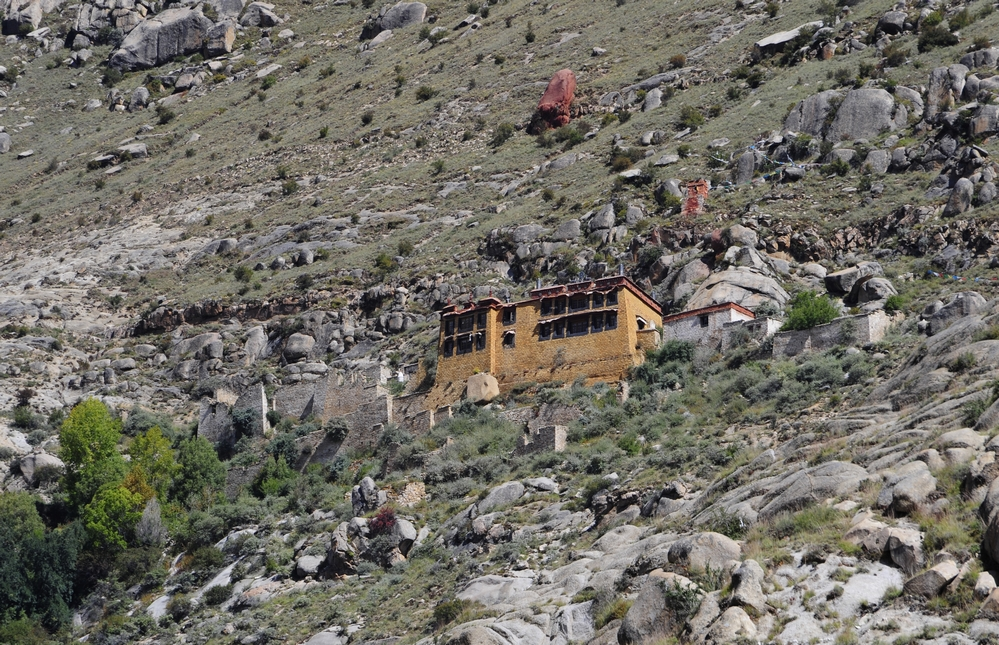
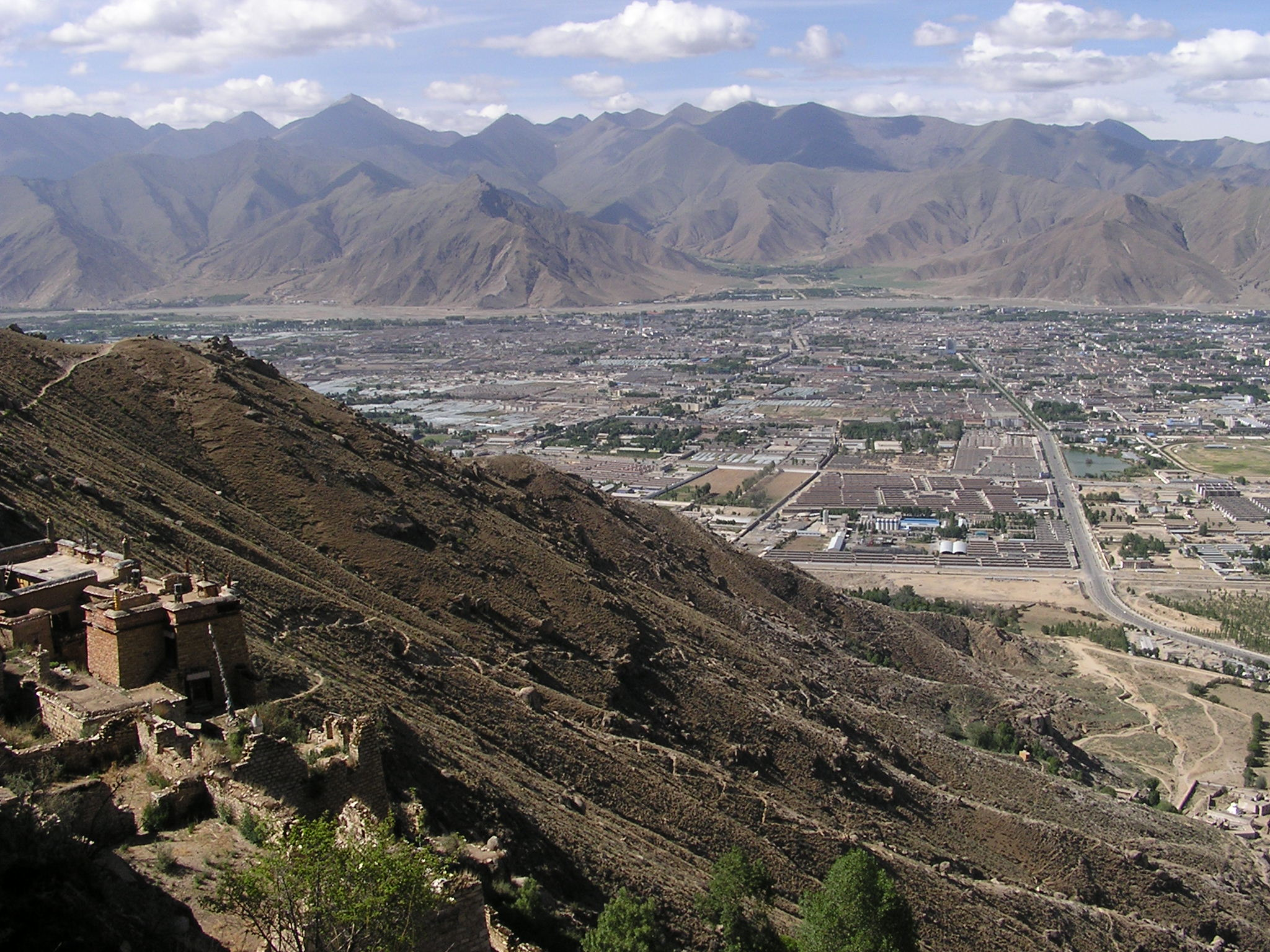
Left: A wider view of Sera Utse Hermitage. Right: Sera Utse Hermitage overlooking Lhasa valley

Entry to the hermitage is through dilapidated walls into a small courtyard and a Lakhang, which provides a commanding view of the Lhasa valley. The hermitage structure, as partly rebuilt post 1959 revolution, is still a fairly large building complex with two courtyards. The structures seen here are: a small hut well kept as an assembly hall (only three monks live here) which houses metal images of Vajrabhairava (Rdo rje 'jigs byed), – large metal image - an image of Yamantaka Ekavira, statue of the Buddha, image of the Sixteen arhats, an image of speaking Tara (Sgrol ma), images of Tsongkhapa (in the cave) and his two disciples (Khedrup Je and Gyeltsab Je) in adjoining caves, and images of bla mas of the Drupkhang incarnation (Sgrub khang sprul sku) lineage. It has also been recorded that some copies of scriptures such as the Bka' 'gyur and Bsta'gyur, which were here before 1959 are not seen now. Similarly, a statue of Bka' gdams pa stupa no longer exists.

Other structures of importance in the hermitage include the residence of the bla ma Sgrub khang bla mas's (two rooms with a waiting room), a meditation hut or "cave", now a chapel, where Sgrub khang pa meditated, a small chapel for the protector deity, a Dharma enclosure (chos rwa) and a hut, built below a boulder, of the patron (sbyin bdag) who financed restoration works of the hermitage.

Above the hills, there is the gongkhang (a small chapel or room) with images of the protecting deities; Pehar, who is said to possess "the State Oracle during his trances" and Palden Lhamo, the multi-riding protectress of the Gelukpa sect.
