= Shigatse Mosque =

Mosque in Shigatse, Tibet, China

- 日喀则清真寺
- Location of the mosque in Tibet

Religion
- Affiliation: Islam
- Ecclesiastical or organisational status: Mosque
- Status: Active

Location
- Location: Samzhubzê District, Shigatse, Tibet
- Country: China
- Coordinates: 29°16′21″N 88°52′32″E

Architecture
- Style: Tibetan-Islamic
- Completed: 1343 CE

Specifications
- Interior area: 320 m^{2} (3,400 sq ft)
- Minaret: 2
- Minaret height: c. 10 m (33 ft)
- Materials: Stone, wood

Chinese name
- Simplified Chinese: 日喀则清真寺
- Traditional Chinese: 日喀則清真寺
Transcriptions
Standard Mandarin
- Hanyu Pinyin: Rìkāzé Qīngzhēnsì

The Shigatse Mosque (simplified Chinese: 日喀则清真寺; traditional Chinese: 日喀則清真寺; pinyin: Rìkāzé Qīngzhēnsì) is a mosque located in Samzhubzê, Xigazê, Shigatse City, in the Tibet Autonomous Region of China.

== History ==
According to local tradition, since the 12th century, groups of Kashmiri Muslim merchants settled in Shigatse and other parts of Tibet. The community began intermarrying with locals and assimilating into Tibetan culture for several centuries afterwards. In the 17th century, the fifth Dalai Lama granted privileges and space for the community to build mosques and burial sites. The Shigatse Mosque was likely constructed around the 17th century though earlier dates such as 1443 or 1343 have been proposed. In the Qianlong period, the Qing government decided to station troops in Jiangzi, Shigatse. Part of the army from Sichuan, Shaanxi area who were stationed in Shigats, formed a small Muslim settlement and repaired the mosque. At the time, it was the only mosque in Shigatse.

The Shigatse Mosque is a Tibetan-style flat-roofed building, sitting west to east, with a floor area of 320 square metres (3,400 sq ft). The mosque is rectangular in shape. There are doors on both sides of a more than 10-metre-high (33 ft) Xuanli minaret, which has an iron, crescent-shaped tip. The mosque is listed as a Cultural Relics Protection Unit in Shigatse.

== See also ==
- Islam in Tibet
- List of mosques in Tibet
- List of mosques in China
