= Dodé Mosque =

Mosque in Lhasa, Tibet, China

- 夺底清真寺
- Location of the mosque in Tibet

Religion
- Affiliation: Sunni Islam
- Ecclesiastical or organizational status: Mosque
- Status: Active

Location
- Location: Dodé Valley, Raidi Township, Chengguan District, Lhasa, Tibet
- Country: China
- Interactive map of Dodé Mosque
- Coordinates: 29°39′32″N 91°08′42″E

Architecture
- Type: Mosque
- Style: Tibetan-Islamic
- Completed: 1917

The Dodé Mosque (Chinese: 夺底清真寺) is a mosque in Dodé Valley, Raidi Township, Chengguan District, Lhasa City, in the Tibet Autonomous Region of China.

The mosque is located in the northern suburbs of Lhasa. It was completed in 1917 in the Tibetan-Islamic style. There is also a Muslim cemetery near the mosque, as first built in roughly the same year as the Great Mosque in Lhasa. Local people called it as "Gege Xia".

== See also ==
- Islam in Tibet
- List of mosques in China
