= Dodé Valley =

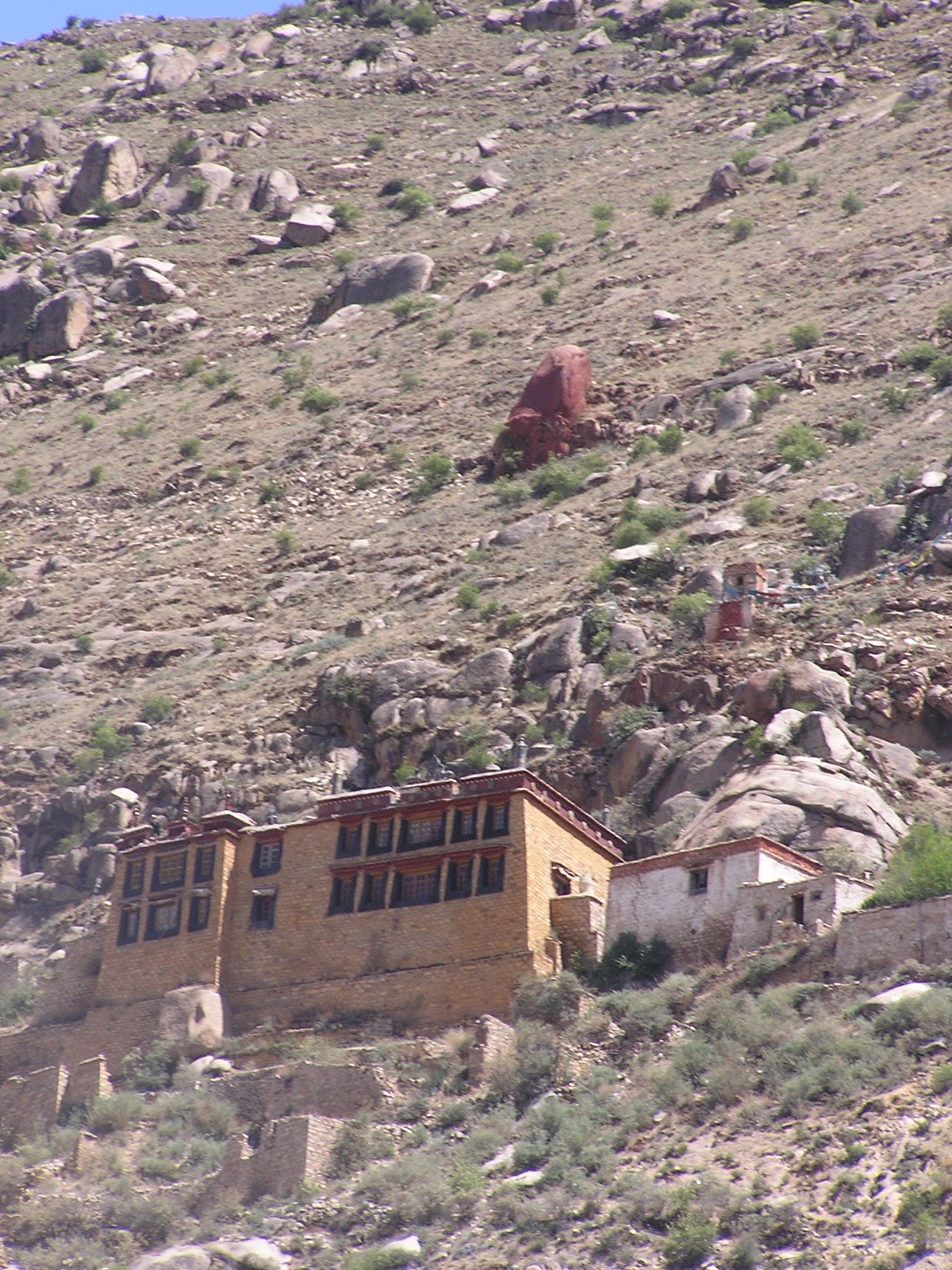
Sera Utsé Hermitage, edge of the Dodé Valley

The Dodé Valley or Dog bde is a northern suburb of Lhasa, Tibet. A number of historical hermitages belonging to Sera Monastery are located here including the Purbuchok Hermitage and Sera Utsé Hermitage. The hills around the valley are known as the Purbuchok mountains. It is a common location for hiking from Lhasa.

The Liusha River, a seasonal river in the north of Lhasa City, poses a flooding problem to Lhasa City, which is fed by the Nyangrain Valley and the Dodé Valley. In order to control the flooding, the Dodé Valley Small Watershed Comprehensive Management Project passed the review in 2010. Subsequently, the construction was started.

There is a mosque in Dodé Valley, called Dodé Mosque, and a Muslim cemetery nearby.
