= Keutsang Hermitage =

Tibetan Buddhist hermitage near Lhasa, Tibet, China

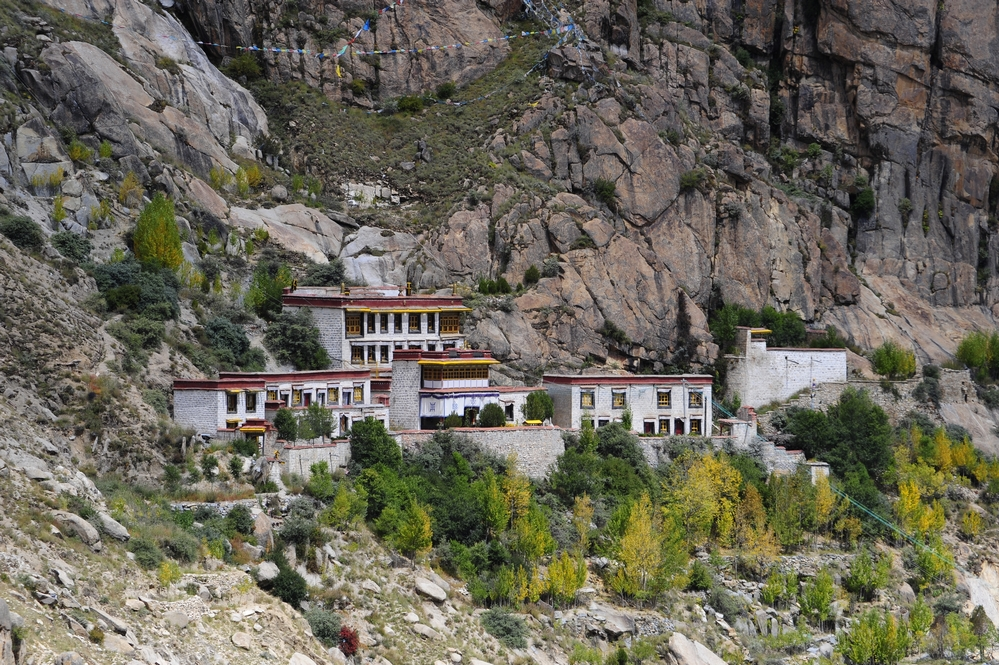
- Keutsang Hermitage

- Location within Tibet

Religion
- Affiliation: Tibetan Buddhism

Location
- Location: Lhasa Prefecture, Tibet, China
- Country: China
- Interactive map of Keutsang Hermitage
- Coordinates: 29°42′9″N 91°8′57″E

Keutsang Hermitage (ke’u tshang) is a historical hermitage, belonging to the Sera Monastery, about 8 kilometres (26,000 ft) northwest of Lhasa in Tibet Autonomous Region. The hermitage was in a precariously perched cave once inhabited by the great Tibetan guru Tsongkhapa. However, the original cave collapsed in a landslide. What is present now was rebuilt, adjoining the ruined Keutsang West Hermitage, at a safer location. As it exists now, Keutsang is to the east of Sera on a hillside above Lhasa’s principal cemetery. Rakhadrak Hermitage is above and close to this hermitage.

The hermitage is one of the pilgrim sites on the Sera Mountain Circumambulation Circuit (se ra’i ri ’khor) of the ‘Sixth-Month Fourth-Day (drug pa tshe bzhi)’ celebrations that devotees visit.

== Topology ==
The word ‘Keutsang’ spelt ke’u tshang denotes “cave,” “cavern,” or “overhang.” Thus, the hermitage is pre-fixed with this word suggesting that it was a cave monastery.

== Geography ==
Keutsang monastery is in deep ravines to the east of Sera on a hillside above Lhasa’s principal cemetery.

== History ==
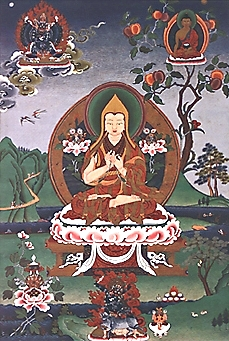
Je Tsongkhapa

While the Tsongkhapa (1357–1419) lived in the cave here, history records that it was used as a retreat by many well-known lamas. A particular mention made is that in the twelfth-century, the founder of the Tshal pa bka’ brgyud school, Bla ma zhang (1123–1193) did penance in this cave.

The first Keutsang incarnation Jampa Mönlam (Ke’u tshang sku phreng dang po byams pa smon lam), the seventeenth abbot of the Sera Jé College (Grwa tshang byes) of Sera founded this hermitage as he wanted to do penance. After he first moved from the Sera Jé College, he lived in a cave for a while and then constructed a small hut for his retreat. During this period the students of the Sera Je college visited him, seeking his lectures. As a result, a small institution developed over the years. After his death, the second incarnate of Kuetsong, Lozang Jamyang Mönlam (Ke’u tshang sku phreng gnyis pa blo bzang ’jam dbyangs smon lam), who was from a wealthy family, provided finances to construct many buildings of the hermitage. The details of third Incarnate are not known; the fourth Incarnate was a close associate of the fourteenth Dalai Lama Tupten Gyatso (Da lai bla ma sku phreng bcu gsum pa thub bstan rgya mtsho). After the death of the thirteenth Dalai Lama, the fourth Keutsang incarnation (Ke’u tshang sprul sku) was instrumental in identifying the fourteenth Dalai Lama. The name, fame and the large structural status of the hermitage are attributed to the association of these high profile Dalai Lamas. From the early nineteenth century up to 1959 Ke’u tshang owned the well-known Drapchi Temple (Grwa bzhi lha khang), which is in the northern part of Lhasa.

The hermitage had a close relationship with Sera all through its history; Every official monk of the hermitage enjoyed de facto status of a monk of the Hamdong Regional House (Har gdong khang tshan) of the Sera Jé College also. The monastery observed all ritualistic practices.

1959 Cultural Revolution

During the 1959 Cultural Revolution, the fifth Keutsang incarnation Keutshang sku phreng lnga pa of the Keutsang Hermitage was incarcerated for a time and later he sought asylum in India in the 1980s.

The hermitage was destroyed during the Cultural Revolution. Rebuilding it was started by a former monk of the hermitage in 1991 and was completed by 1992. The rebuilt hermitage now houses 25 monks.

== Structure ==
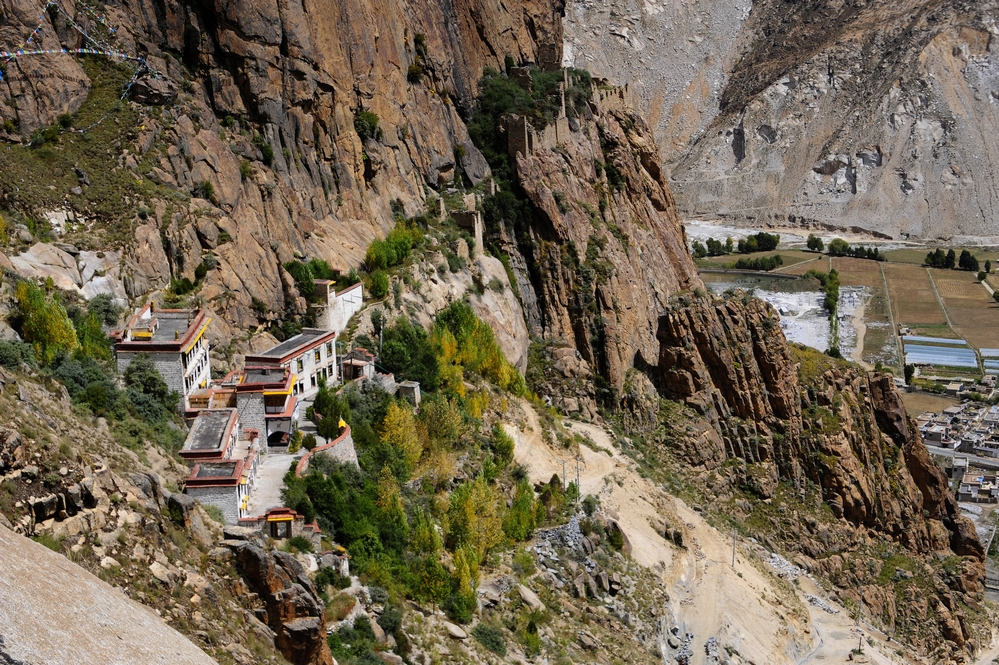
Keutsang Hermitage on the left with ruins of Keutsang West Hermitage on the west ledge of the hill

The hermitage complex is enclosed by compound walls with an east gate and a west gate of entry. It has images installed in temples and chapels; all are new. In a small chapel near the west gate Acala (Mi g.yo ba)‘s self manifest image is seen (it was earlier on a boulder rock that was moved into the shrine, into a more sanitised and sanctified location) in the Dharma courtyard (chos rwa). The main temple is in the centre of the enclosed courtyard. It is a double-storied building with an assembly hall (’du khang). The second floor oaccommodates the reception and committee rooms. The monastery also has a community kitchen adjoining the living quarters for the monks. A guest house is part of the complex of buildings.

On the back side of the main temple there is a three-story secondary temple building, which houses a Scripture Temple (Bka’ ’gyur lha khang) on the second floor; the first floor provides the staircase and some storage space. The altar, at the centre of the second floor, has three protector deities enshrined in it. These are the images of main idol of Dpal ldan lha mo at the middle with images of Rdo rje g.yu sgron ma the “site deity” (gnas bdag) of the monastery and of Nyang bran rgyal chen, on the flanks. On the same floor, there is the Tengyur chapel (Bstan ’gyur lha khang) that has a collection of the translated Indian Buddhist treatises. The third floor has the Maitreya Chapel (Byams khang) where a two-storied tall statue of Maitreya (Byams pa) is deified. This idol overlooks the cemetery in the hermitage precincts. This floor also provides for residential accommodation for the Da lai bla ma and the rooms for the Ke’u tshang bla ma. In the northeast corner of the hermitage, there is a large “Dharma enclosure” or chos rwa that was built in 2004. This enclosure is regularly used by younger monks to recite and memorize the scriptures related to rituals, which are the hallmark of the hermitage.

== Religious observances ==
Keutsang, as a religious ritual hermitage, celebrates the new and full Moon days, as well as the tenth and twenty-fifth of the lunar month. Local villagers invite the monks of the hermitage to their houses to perform rituals, which adds to the coffers of the hermitage. Apart from the monthly rituals, the monks of the hermitage perform annual ritual cycles such as the Tibetan New Year, eight sets of two-day Avalokiteśvara fasting rituals (smyung gnas), and chant the rainy season precepts in summer. A memorization exam to test the skills of the junior monks on the ritual texts is held in the eighth Tibetan month. This examination is held by a senior scholar of Sera Monastery.
