= Kwetsang Rinpoche =

Kwetsang Rinpoche was a lama of Sera who participated in the search for Tenzin Gyatso four years after Thubten Gyatso died.

== See also ==
- Keutsang Hermitage
