= Purbuchok Hermitage =

Tibetan Buddhist hermitage in Lhasa, Tibet, China

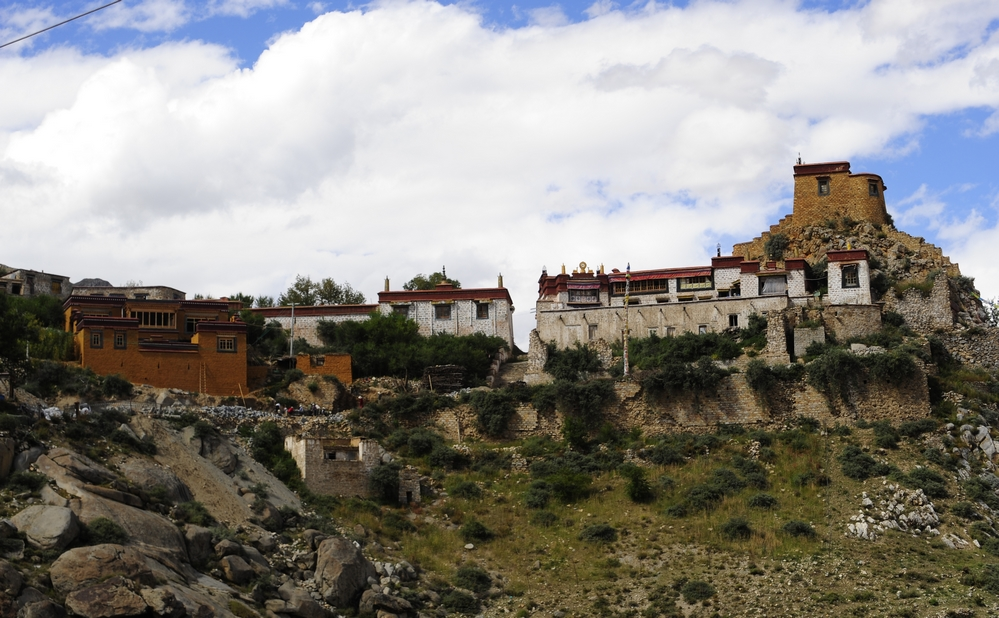

- Location within Tibet

Religion
- Affiliation: Tibetan Buddhism
- Sect: Tselpa Kagyü school,

Location
- Location: Lhasa Prefecture, Tibet, China
- Country: Tibet
- Interactive map of Purbuchok Hermitage
- Coordinates: 29°42′37″N 91°08′59″E

Architecture
- Founder: Purchok Rinpoché
- Established: 1706

Purbuchok Hermitage (Phur bu lcog ri khrod) is a hermitage situated in the northeastern corner of the Lhasa Valley in the northern suburb of Dodé in the Tibet Autonomous Region of the People's Republic of China. Destroyed by the Chinese in 1959, it was mostly restored in 1984. Affiliated to the Sera Monastery, it is the last hermitage to be visited on the “Sixth-Month Fourth-Day” (drug pa tshe bzhi) pilgrimage circuit. The hills surrounding the monastery have been given name tags of the three protectors of the divine paradise namely the Avalokiteśvara, Manjusri and Vajrapani. It is also identified with the six-syllables divine mantra (sngags)- OM Mani Padme Hum.

== Geography ==
The hermitage is located at the northeastern corner of Lhasa, midway to the northern mountains in the Lhasa suburb of the Dodé Valley along with Sera Utsé Hermitage. The mountainous landscape of the hermitage is imbued with serene sanctity and is blessed (jinchen), which fact is expressively described. The hills to the west are described to be in the shape of two auspicious golden fish (trashi sernya). The northern mountain is called the Soul-Mountain of Mañjuśrī (Jampelyangkyi Lari) and also as Moktogo, with a rock outcrop interpreted to be in the shape of conch shell. The eastern mountains are ascribed to contain the palace of Avalokiteśvara The mountain-abode (neri) of Vajrapāni, who is said to be the “door-keeper” (gosung) for the entire region, appears as if it had a flag on its peak. Consequently, the hermitage has provided inspiration to the meditating monks in different “metaphysical rhetoric of sacred space".

== Legend ==
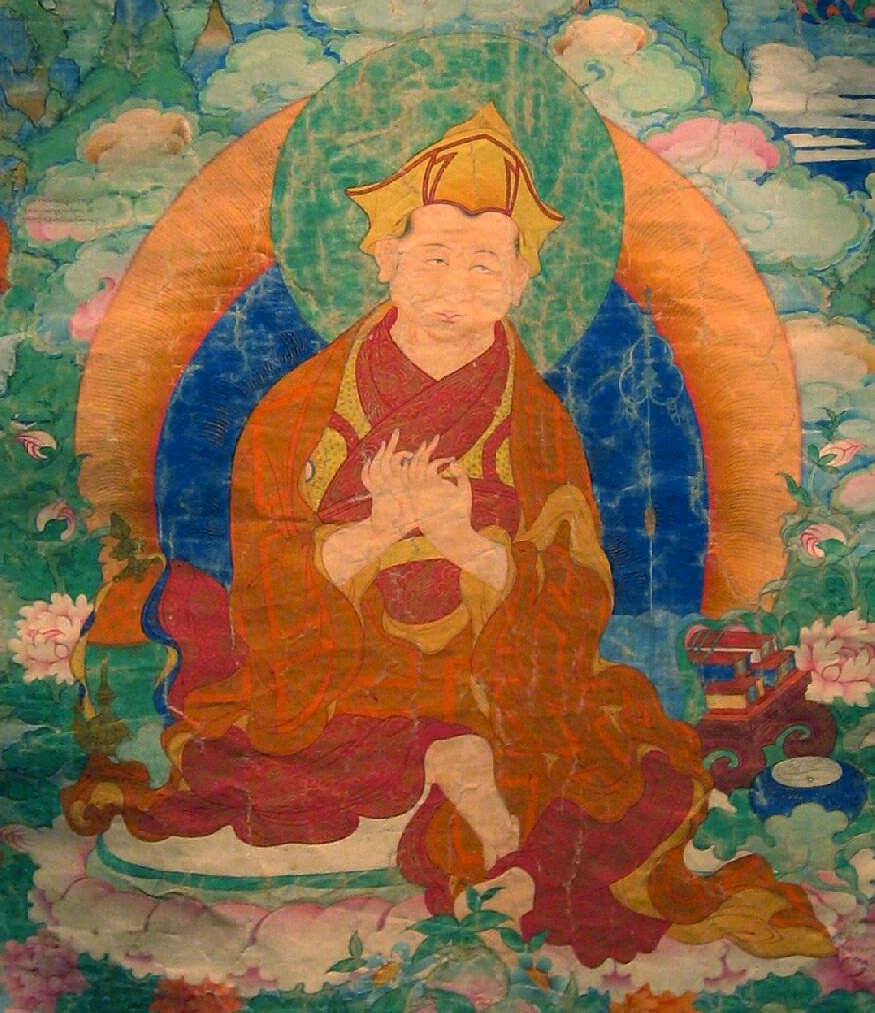
Ngawang Jampa

According to the local legend, Drupkhang Gelek Gyatso (1641–1713), during his sojourns around Tibet, planned to visit 'Zangri', the centre of Zangri Karmar, established by Machik Lapdrön, the well-known female saint of the twelfth century. However, in a dream he had one day before his departure to Zangri, he saw a statue white statue that was inferred as that of Machik Lapdrön's son, Tönyön Samdrup. Subsequently, after Drupkhangpa moved to Sera Utse (as his permanent hermitage), he started exploring the region to locate the 'white stupa' that he had seen earlier in a dream. He located it at Purbochuk, between 1701 and 1706. He then performed the prescribed rituals and prayers at the location, which was later developed by one of his students – Ngawang Jampa (Purchok Kutreng Dadengpo Ngawang Jampa, 1682–1762) – initially as a cave. Around this cave, subsequent developments took place with funds generated by the Purchok Rinpoché from several benefactors (devotees) of the region.

== History ==
The earliest history of the hermitage is traced to the ninth century when Padmasambhava (Padma ’byung gnas) meditated here. The main cave where he did penance is known as the ‘Cavern of Dochung Chongzhi (Rdo cung cong zhi’i phug pa)'. However, it was in the twelfth century that the founder of the Tshalpa Kagyu school, Zhang Drowé Gönpo Yudrakpa (1123-1193), founded a practice centre here. Thereafter, this location has been known as 'Purchok' (literal meaning), “a dagger at its pinnacle”. Over the centuries, the monastery has seen many eminent monastic officials playing a role in its building, such as the Zhang ’gro ba’i mgon po g.yu brag pa (1123–1193), female saint Ma cig lab sgron, Sgrub khang dge legs rgya mtsho’s (1641–1713), Ngawang Jampa (Phur lcog sku phreng dang po ngag dbang byams pa, 1682–1762) and Pan chen blo bzang ye shes (1663–1737). Royal family members like the Queen Tsering Trashi (Rgyal mo tshe ring bkra shis) and the King of Tibet Pho lha nas (1689–1747) also supported the activities of the hermitage. However, the most significant face of development occurred during the third Purchok incarnation Lozang Tsültrim Jampa Gyatso (Phur lcog sku phreng gsum pa blo bzang tshul khrims byams pa rgya mtsho) who was teacher of the 13th and 14th Dalai Lamas.

However, upon the Chinese invasion of 1959, the hermitage saw almost total destruction. Since 1984, with approval of the local government, a reconstruction phase was begun and the hermitage has been substantially restored now to its past glory.

== Structure ==
The hermitage, as seen in 2004, after restoration works carried out generally in keeping with the original layout, consists of three main wings namely: the main temple (dukhang’du khang) in the first enclosure; the Temple of the Three Protectors (Riksum Gönpo LhakhangRigs gsum mgon po lha khang) in the second enclosure; and a new library building with the debating courtyard. Open space to the west and southwest of the library enclosure has the living quarters of the monks.

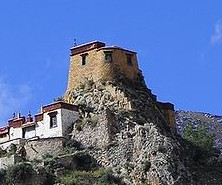
The Three Protectors temple towers over the rest of the hermitage

While the 'Three Protector's temple' has been refurbished around the original walls, all the other areas have been re-built. The main temple is three tiered with a yellow building that towers over the entire hermitage complex credited to have been built the founder of the hermitage – Drupkhangpa – which is the 'Temple of the Three Protectors' where images of the 'Three Protectors' namely Avalokiteśvara, Mañjuśrī, and Vajrapāni are new since the original statues were destroyed. The temple caretaker's room and a kitchen are adjacent to the temple.

Descending from the temple of the three protectors temple leads to a courtyard with several entry doors; northern side has monks' rooms with yellow coloured windows and the southern side has Purchok Rinpoché's rooms. Further away, through a smaller courtyard, is the 'Scripture Chapel' (Kangyur Lhakhang). Living quarters of the monks are on the top floor of the main temple. Below the top floor are a firewood store and a gong room (gong used to call the monks for prayers and eating). At the lowest level of the main temple compound are: the main temple, cave temple of Purchok Rinpoché, protector deity chapel, a mani [wheel] temple (mani lhakhang), a kitchen and a store room.

In the Dharma enclosure (chöra), a large open space in front of the main temple, had in the past a “Dharma Enclosure Assembly Hall” that was destroyed and not rebuilt. However, some murals are seen at the base of one of the walls of this enclosure. A new library has been built adjoining these ruins that houses a collection of the Tengyur.

== Religious observances ==
The monastery, with its strength of thirty-eight monks, basically functions as a ritualistic establishment, as in the past. The rituals observed are the performance of the self-initiation (danjuk) rituals of Vajrabhairava (Dorjé Jikjé), Sarvavid Vairocana (Künrik Nampar Nangdzé), the Medicine Buddha (Menla), the Sixteen Arhats (Neten Chudruk), and the monastery's protector deities. In 2000, a novel addition introduced was the emphasis on the teachings of the classical philosophical Buddhist texts, as supplementation to the ritualistic practices carried out by the monks.
