= Liusha River (Lhasa) =

River in Tibet, China

The Liusha River is a seasonal river in the northern part of Chengguan District, Lhasa City, Tibet Autonomous Region.

== Geography ==
The river is a seasonal river formed by the confluence of the water flows of Dodé Valley and Nyangrain Valley, and the river is in water from May to October every year. The river flows from Dodé Valley through Nyangrain Valley to the north corner of Lhalu Wetland. The river is also one of the main floodways in Lhasa.

== Management ==
In 1975, the Chinese Communist Party Lhasa Municipal Committee and Municipal Government mobilized the city's institutions and enterprises, the People's Liberation Army in Tibet and citizens to divert the old Liusha River. This made it possible to eliminate the threat of flooding to the urban area of Lhasa, and also made it possible to effectively develop and utilize a large area of land in the northern suburbs.

In June 1989, the government invested 500,000 yuan to build a 29,700-square-meter sedimentation pond to prevent sediment from infringing on the 9,900 acres of wetlands and pastures south of Barku. Construction of the East Main Drainage Canal, North Main Drainage Canal, General Main Drainage Canal Project flood control standards, to solve the East Main Sedimentation Pond System Project, construction of barrage dams, sedimentation ponds, sand flushing gates, cofferdams, to improve the North Main Drainage Canal, East Main Drainage Canal flood control standards, to solve the problem of East Main Drainage Canal sedimentation.

In 2012, Lhasa Water Conservancy Bureau implemented the Liusha River improvement and flood control project, the river was repaired, and the flood control standard was greatly improved.
