= Lhasa Great Mosque =

Mosque in Lhasa, Tibet, China

- 拉萨清真大寺
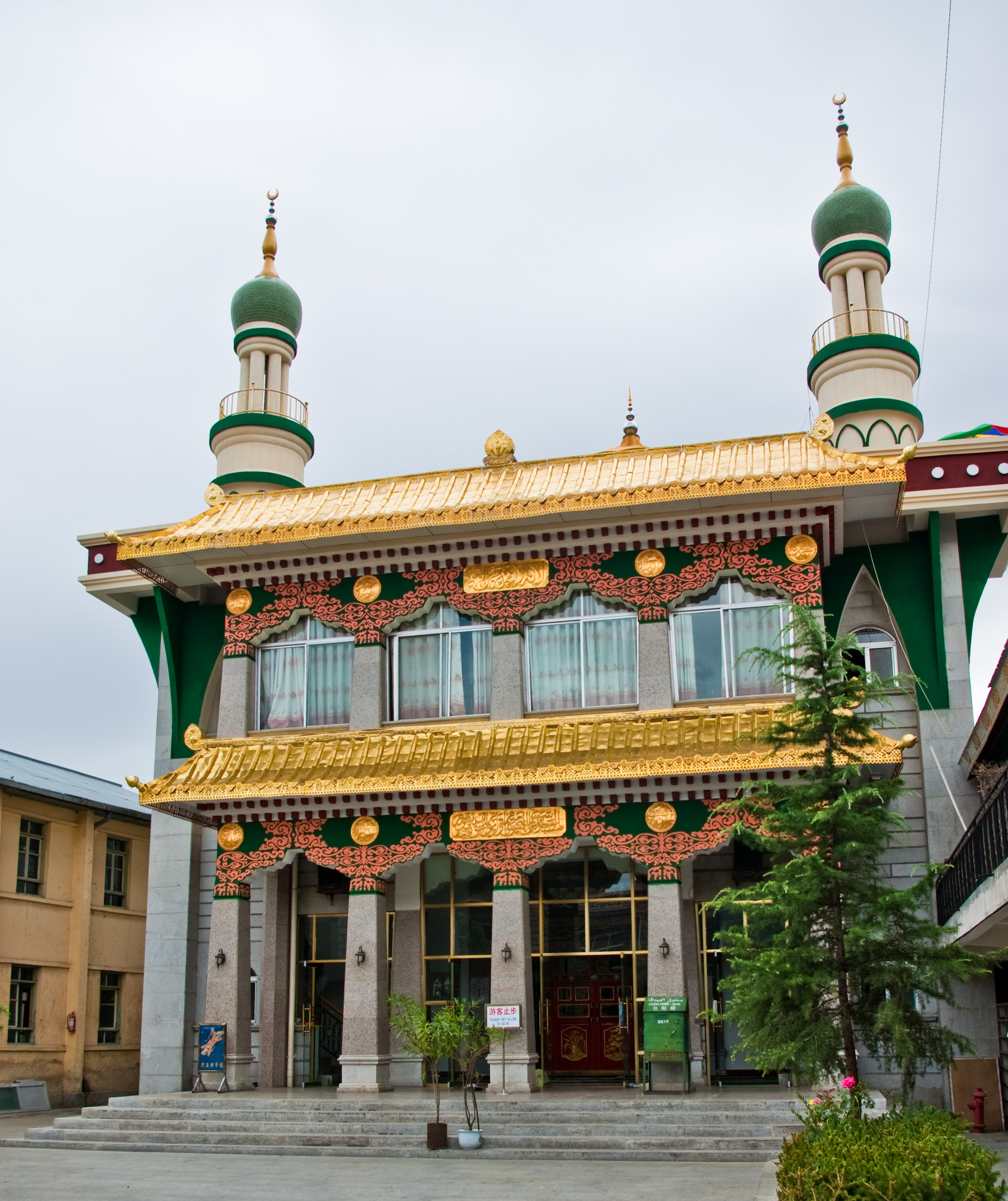

- Location of the mosque in Tibet

Religion
- Affiliation: Sunni Islam
- Ecclesiastical or organizational status: Mosque
- Status: Active

Location
- Location: Lhasa, Tibet
- Country: China
- Interactive map of Lhasa Great Mosque
- Coordinates: 29°39′03″N 91°08′12″E

Architecture
- Type: Mosque
- Completed: 1716 (original); 1959 (current)

Specifications
- Interior area: 1,300 m^{2} (14,000 sq ft)
- Dome: 1
- Minaret: 2
- Site area: 2,600 m^{2} (28,000 sq ft)

Tibetan name
- Tibetan: རྒྱ་ཁ་ཆའི་ལྷ་ཁང་།་
Transcriptions
- Wylie: rgya kha cha'i lha khang

Chinese name
- Simplified Chinese: 拉萨清真大寺
- Traditional Chinese: 拉薩清真大寺
Transcriptions
Standard Mandarin
- Hanyu Pinyin: Lāsà Qīngzhēndàsì

The Lhasa Great Mosque (simplified Chinese: 拉萨清真大寺; traditional Chinese: 拉薩清真大寺; pinyin: Lāsà Qīngzhēndàsì; Standard Tibetan: རྒྱ་ཁ་ཆའི་ལྷ་ཁང་།་), also known as the Hebalin Mosque (Chinese: 河坝林清真寺; pinyin: Hébàlín Qīngzhēn Sì), is a mosque in Lhasa, in the Tibet Autonomous Region of China.

== History ==
The mosque was built in 1716 and was expanded in 1793. It was primarily built by traders from Kashmir who settled in Lhasa.

Soon after being destroyed by Tibetan mobs during the 1959 Tibetan uprising, the mosque was rebuilt and renovated. During the Cultural Revolution, the mosque was repurposed as a committee office and agricultural co-operative site until 1978, when the mosque was reinstated as a religious space. During the 2008 Tibetan unrest, Tibetan mobs burned the mosque.

== Architecture ==
The mosque has a three-entrance sahn which covers 2,600 square metres (28,000 sq ft). The built area is 1,300 square metres (14,000 sq ft) which consists of the prayer hall, Pai building, bunker building, ablution hall, bathroom and other facilities. The 285-square-metre (3,070 sq ft) prayer hall is located in the west which consists of inner hall, open hall and main platform. The building was completed in the traditional Zang architectural style and also combines religious and local features.

== Gallery ==
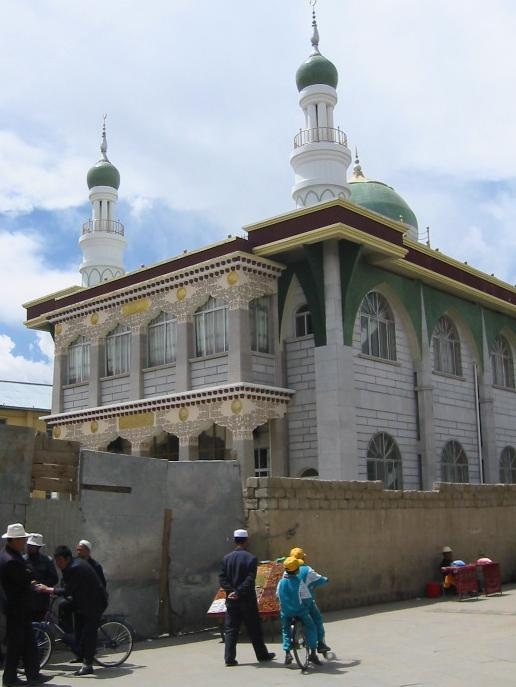
The mosque in 2004

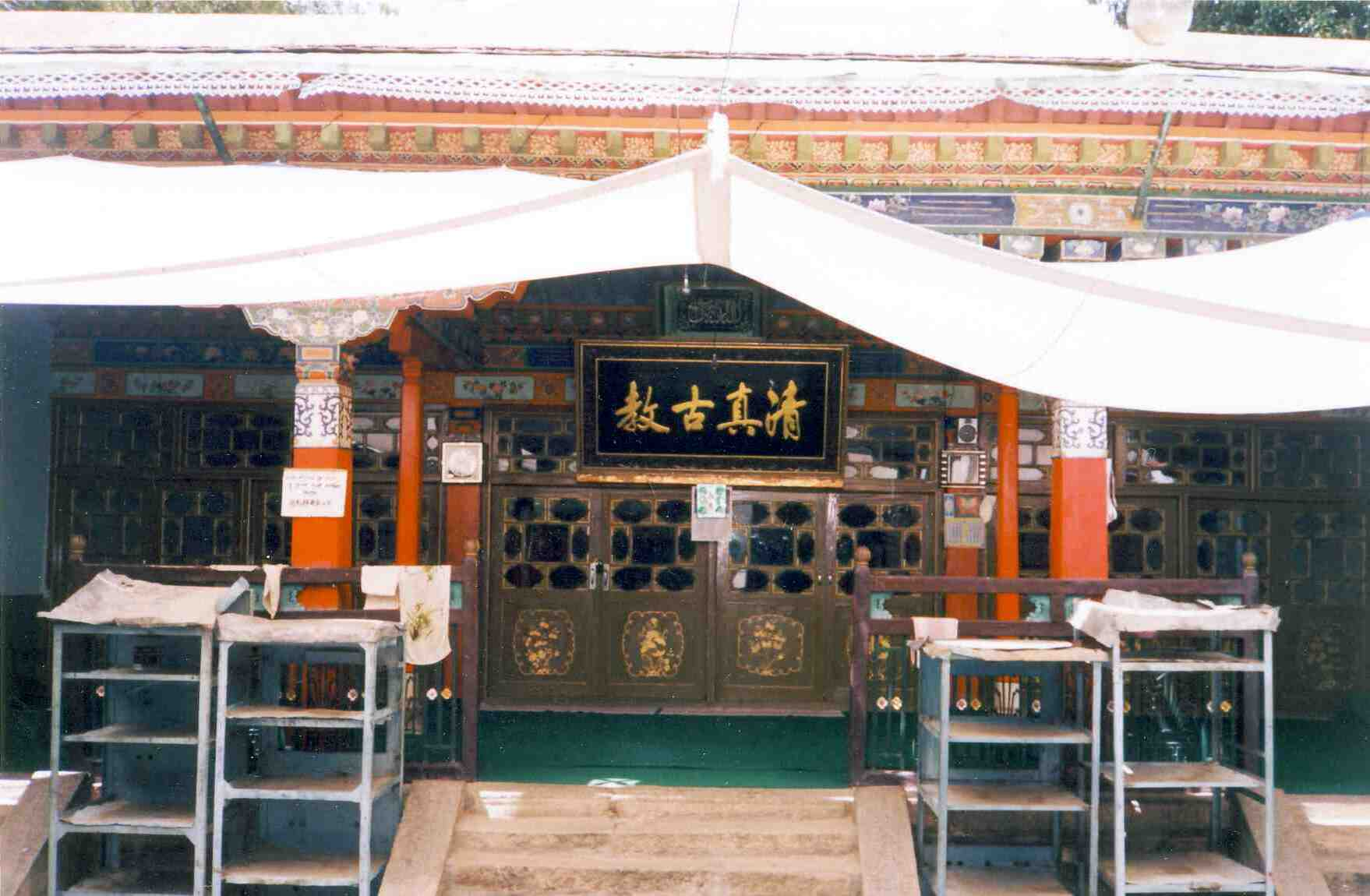
Entrance to old mosque in 1993

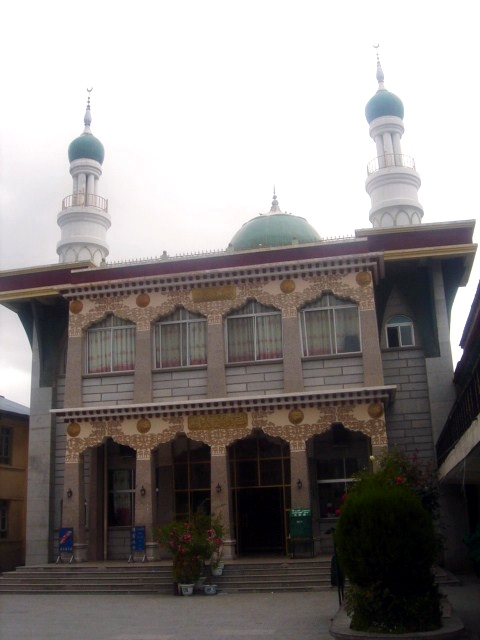
The mosque in 2007

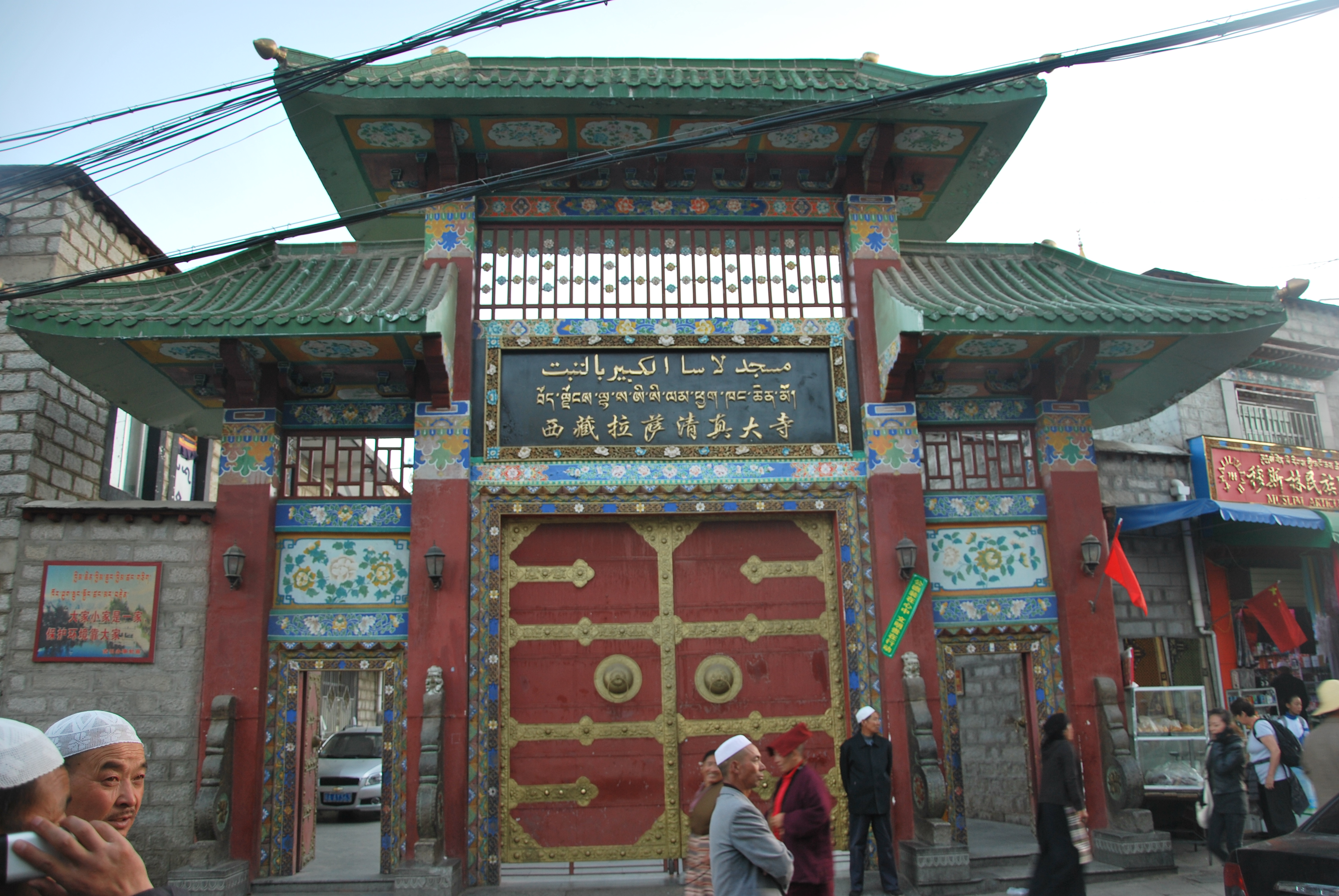
Main gate

== See also ==
- Islam in China
- Tibetan Muslims
- List of mosques in Tibet
