= Tibetan Muslims =

Ethnoreligious group

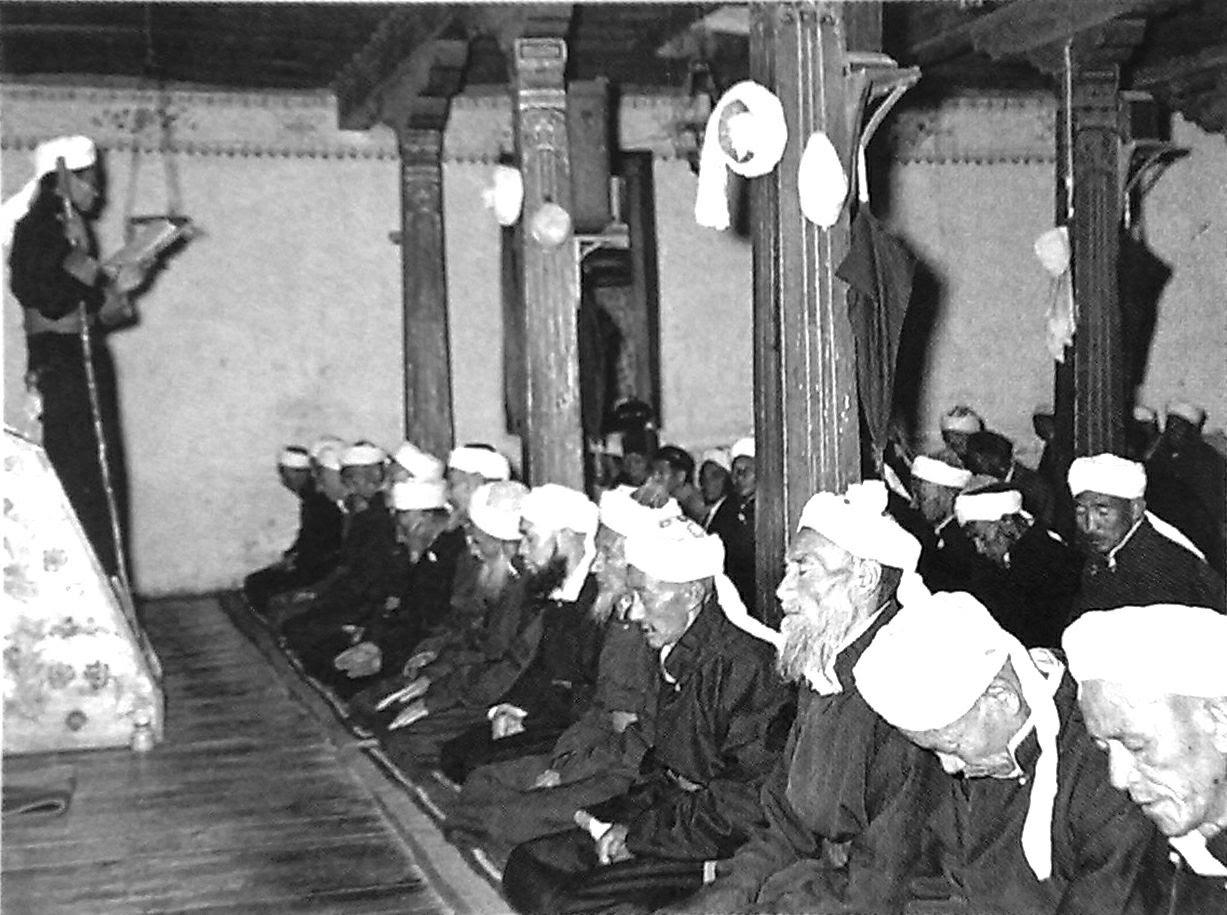
- Muslims in Lhasa praying in a mosque in the 1950s

Total population
- 2-3% of Net Tibetan population

Regions with significant populations
- China (Tibet AR, Yunnan, Gansu): 12,000 (2023)
- India (Kashmir • Ladakh • Sikkim • North Bengal): 1,500+
- Nepal: 400

Religions
- Islam

Languages
- Tibetan • Mandarin • Kashmiri • Urdu • Nepali

Related ethnic groups
- Tibetan people • Baltis • Purigpa

Tibetan Muslims

Tibetan name
- Tibetan: ཁ་ཆེ་
Transcriptions
- Wylie: kha-che

Chinese name
- Chinese: 卡契
- Literal meaning: Khache (phonetic)
Transcriptions
Standard Mandarin
- Hanyu Pinyin: Kǎqì

Alternative Chinese name
- Chinese: 藏回
- Literal meaning: Tibetan Hui
Transcriptions
Standard Mandarin
- Hanyu Pinyin: Zàng Huí

Second alternative Chinese name
- Chinese: 古格人
- Literal meaning: Guge people
Transcriptions
Standard Mandarin
- Hanyu Pinyin: Gǔgé rén

Tibetan Muslims, also known as the Khache (Tibetan: ཁ་ཆེ་, lit. 'Kashmiris'), are Tibetans who adhere to Islam. Many are descendants of Kashmiris, Ladakhis and Nepalis who arrived in Tibet in the 14th to 17th centuries. There are approximately 10,000 Tibetan Muslims living in China, over 1,500 in India, and 300 to 400 in Nepal.

The government of the People's Republic of China does not recognize the Tibetan Muslims as a distinct ethnic group; they are grouped with Tibetan adherents of Buddhism and Bön. In contrast, the Chinese-speaking Hui Muslims are distinguished from the Han Chinese majority.

== Etymology ==
In Tibet, Tibetan Muslims are known as Khache, which literally translates as 'Kashmiri' in Tibetan, because many are descendants of pre-modern emigrants from Kashmir. In Nepal, they are split into two groups: the Khache, who have Kashmiri ancestry and therefore hold Indian passports; and the Khazar, who have Nepali ancestry and therefore hold Nepali passports.

== History ==
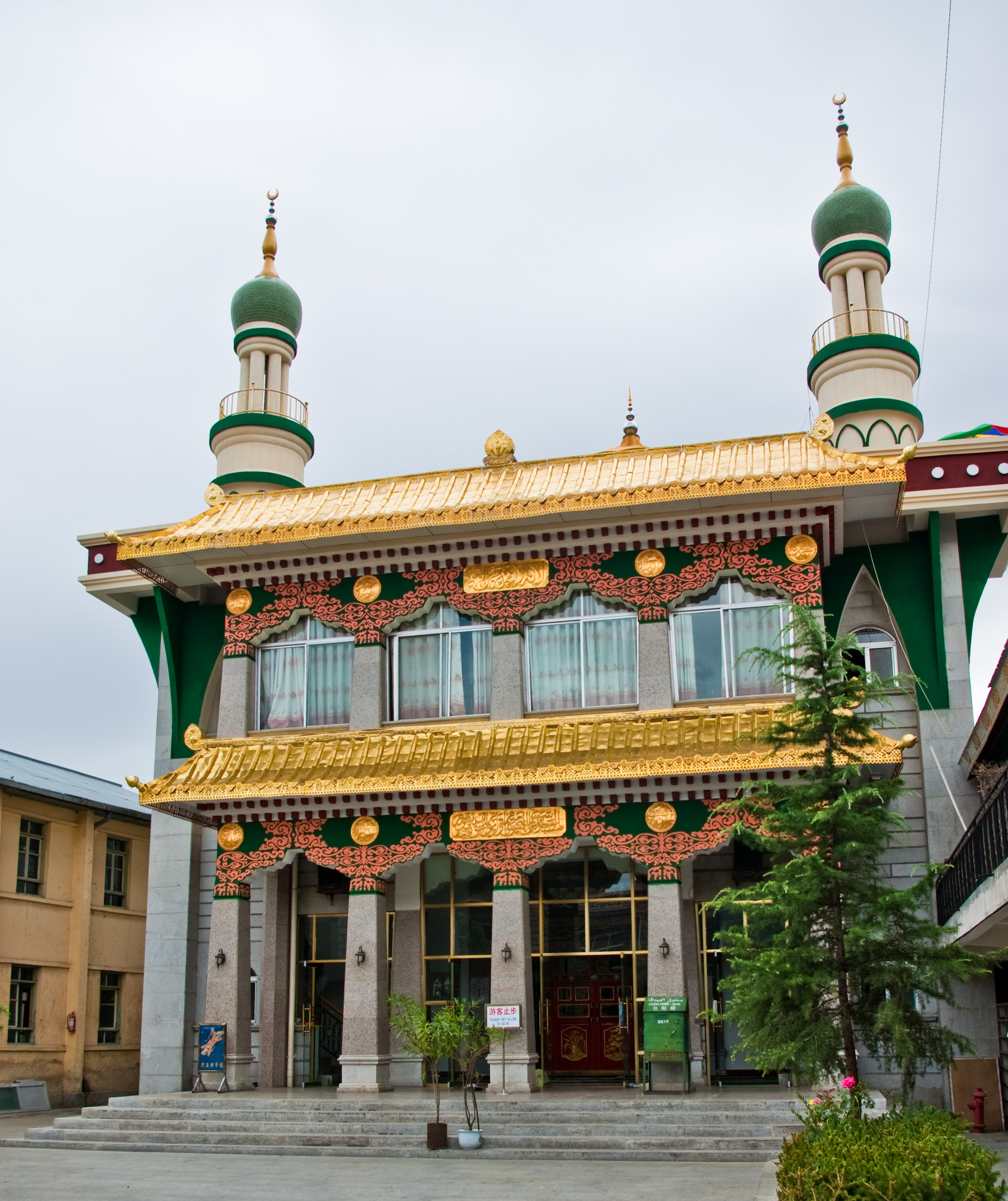
Lhasa Great Mosque

=== Early history ===
The first contacts between Tibet and the Islamic world began around the mid-eighth century when it grew out of a combination of trade via the Silk Road and the military presence of Muslim forces in the Fergana Valley. Despite the vague knowledge the Islamic world had about Tibet, there were a few early Islamic works that mention Tibet. One such source is from a work authored by Abu Sa'id Gardezi titled Zayn al-Akhbar. In it, the work mentions the environment, fantastical origin of the Tibetans (through the Himyarites), the divinity of the king, major resources (like musk) and a description of the trade routes to and from Tibet. Another source, Hudud al-'Alam (The Regions of the World) written by an unknown author in 982 or 983 in Afghanistan, contains mainly geography, politics and brief descriptions of Tibetan regions, cities, towns and other localities. This source has the first direct mention of the presence of Muslims in Tibet by stating that Lhasa had one mosque and a small Muslim population.

During the reign of Sadnalegs (800–815), there was a protracted war against Arab powers to the West. It appears that Tibetans captured a number of Arab troops and pressed them into service on the eastern frontier in 801. Tibetans were active as far west as Samarkand and Kabul. Arab forces began to gain the upper hand, and the Tibetan governor of Kabul submitted to the Arabs and became a Muslim about 812 or 815.

=== Fourteenth century to present ===
Extensive trade with Kashmir, Ladakh, and Baltistan also brought Muslims to Tibet especially after the adoption or growing presence of Islam in these regions starting from the fourteenth century. The ongoing growth of Muslims continued as an effect of the Tibetan-Ladakhi treaty of 1684 in which the Tibetan government allowed trade missions from Ladakh to enter Lhasa every three years. Many Kashmiri and Ladakhi Muslims joined these missions with some settling in Tibet.

During the reign of the Dalai Lama Ngawang Lobsang Gyatso (1617–1682), a permanent Muslim community settled down in Tibet. They were permitted to elect their own council of representatives, settle their group's legal disputes with Islamic law, and some land was donated to them for the construction of a mosque close to Lhasa. The community soon adopted aspects of Tibetan culture like dress, diet, and the Tibetan language.

An influx of Kashmiri Muslims in Nepal (originally having trade contacts with their kin in Tibet) fled to Tibet starting from 1769 due to the invasion of the Kathmandu Valley by Prithvi Narayan Shah. As early as the seventeenth century, Ningxia and other northwestern Hui (Chinese Muslims) began to settle in the eastern regions of Tibet (like in Amdo). They intermarried with the local Tibetans and continued to have extensive trade contacts with other Muslims inside China.

Another recent wave of new Muslim settlers began after the Dogra conquest of Tibet in 1841. Many Kashmiri, Balti and Ladakhi Muslim troops (who were taken as prisoners when fighting against the Dogra army) stayed behind to settle in Tibet. A few Hindu Dogras also settled in Tibet and subsequently converted to Islam.

Among the many Hui subgroups, the geographical distribution of the "Tibetan Hui/Tibetan Muslims" is limited to the Tibetan area, and there are two main distribution areas in China – the "Tibetan Hui" in the Karigang area of the present-day Hualong Hui Autonomous County in Qinghai Province, whose original ethnic group was Tibetan, and due to their longstanding close economic dealings with the Hui around them, have been influenced by the Hui in their daily lives, which has led to their cultural integration of Hui religious beliefs and their conversion to Islam, and have been recognized as "Tibetan Muslims" by the surrounding ethnic groups. The Tibetan Hui in Lhasa (unlike other Tibetan Muslims living elsewhere) consider themselves to be very different from the Chinese Muslims and sometimes marry with other Tibetans (including Buddhists).

Outside of the Lhasa area, smaller Muslim communities and mosques exist in Shigatse, Tsetang, and Chengguan. Their forefathers were Hui, and because they have lived in the Tibetan area for a long time, they have borrowed the way of life of the Tibetans, as in the case of the Hui groups in Diqing Tibetan Autonomous Prefecture in Yunnan Province. They are called "Tibetan Muslims" and "Tibetan Hui" because they have lived and grown up in Tibetan areas for more than a century and have been strongly influenced by Tibetan culture, and their daily life is similar to that of the Tibetans. According to a 2008 research, in recent years there has been a tendency among Tibetans in Shangri-La County to return to Islam, with the disappearance of spiritual beliefs such as Tibetan Buddhism, Dongbaism, witchcraft, and primitive beliefs, and a more devout belief in Islam.

== Question of citizenship ==
In 1959, Prime Minister Jawaharlal Nehru concluded that the Barkor Khache were Indian citizens. The first letter written by the Barkor Khache community in Lhasa was to Tibetan Muslims in Kalimpong in 1959:

It is vitally important for us to let you know that the Chinese Government, after the recent trouble in Lhasa, has threateningly asked us about our ancestry. In reply we declared ourselves with cogent evidence as Kashmiris and subjects of India. The Chinese Government is trying its best to subjugate us and make us Chinese Nationals.

The Chinese government attempted to coerce the Barkor Khache into accepting Chinese citizenship and giving up their claims to Indian citizenship. They were initially prevented by China from emigrating to India. The Chinese authorities harassed them, beat them, subjected them to arbitrarily high taxes and told them to attend "indoctrination meetings". On 2 September 1960, Chinese leaders announced that the Barkor Khache would be allowed to leave. The Barkor Khache began leaving later that month to India, via the Kingdom of Sikkim. Whereas, the Wapaling Khaches decided to stay in Hebalin.

== Language ==
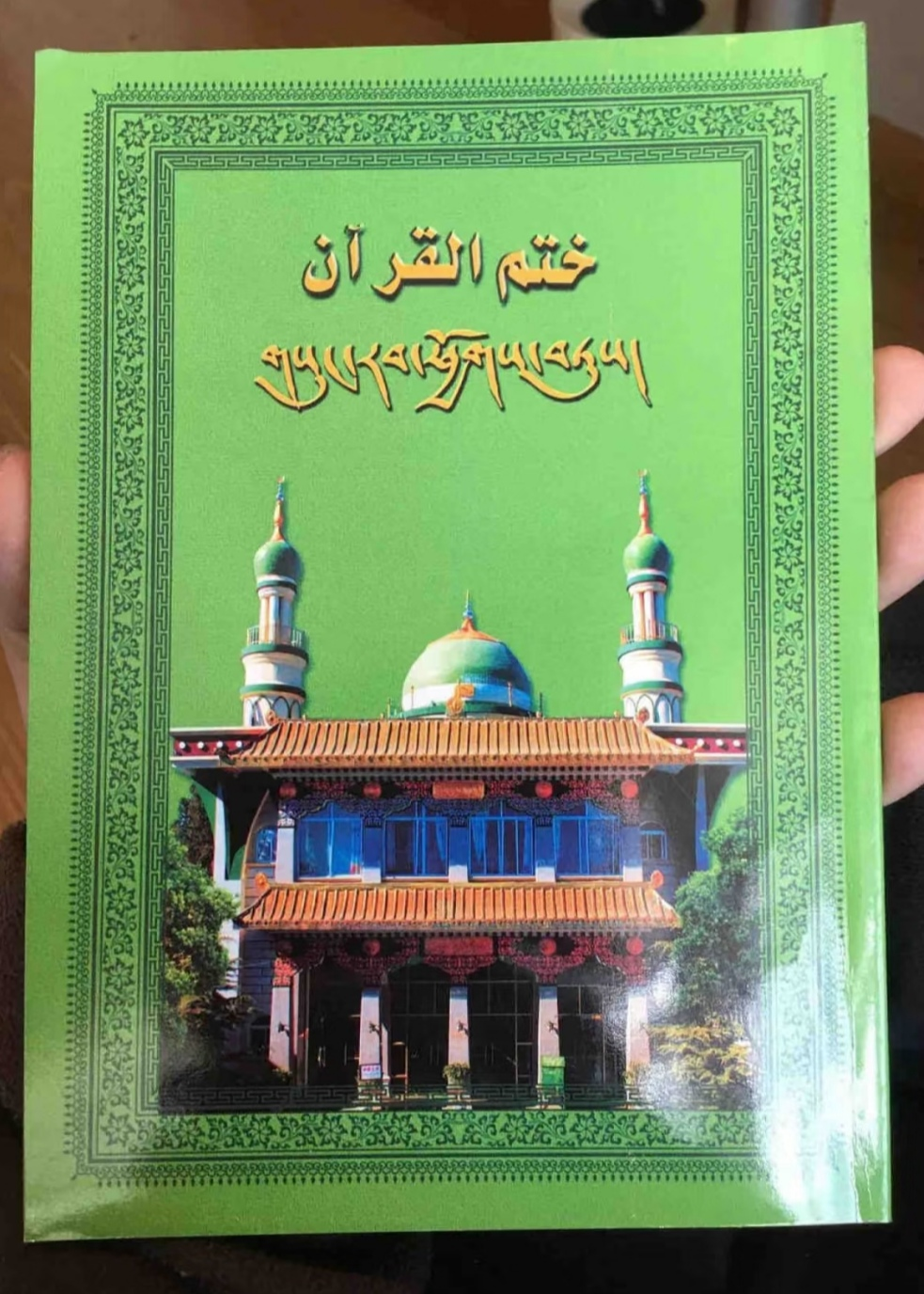
A Cover of Bilingual Tibetan-Koshur Quran

The Tibetan Muslims, like Muslims elsewhere in China, are primarily Sunni and, like other Tibetans, speak a local dialect of Tibetan. The Balti people of Baltistan, who belong to the Shiite sect, also use a dialect of Tibetan (locally known as Balti) that is a mixture of other languages, but is written in the Arabic alphabet, with many loanwords from Arabic, Persian, and Urdu, and the Balti people also use both Persian and Urdu.

== Culture ==
=== Sub-groups ===
- Barkor and Wapaling Khache
- Ladakhi Khache
- Singpa Khache
- Siling Khache
- Gharib Khache

== Notable Personalities ==
- Qasim Khallow

== See also ==
- Islam in China
- Balti people, Muslims of Tibetan ancestry who live in Baltistan, Pakistan
- Purigpa, Muslims of Tibetan ancestry who live in Ladakh, India
- Religion in Tibet
- Dai Muslims
