= Lobsang Tashi =

Tibetan politician (1901–1966)

- བལོ་བཟནག་བཀྲ་སྷིས
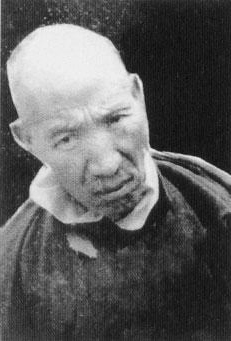

Kalön Tripa of Tibet
- In office November 17, 1950 – April 27, 1952
- Preceded by: Langdun

Personal details
- Born: 1901 Tibet
- Died: 1966 (aged 64–65) Drapchi, Tibet

Lobsang Tashi (Tibetan: བལོ་བཟནག་བཀྲ་སྷིས, Wylie: blo-bzang bkra-shis), also known as Khenchen Lobsang Tashi (1901–1966) was a Tibetan politician who was a senior monastic official and the monastic prime minister (sileun) of the Tibetan government during the early Chinese occupation of Tibet. After the departure of the 14th Dalai Lama in 1959, he was incarcerated in Drapchi Prison where he died in 1966.

== Biography ==
In the late 1930s, Lobsang Tashi was assigned to the Tibet office in Nanjing, where he interacted with the Chinese.

He was appointed as a monastic prime minister, along with Lukhangwa, a senior lay official, by the Dalai Lama before he left for Yatung in the Chumbi Valley in December 1950 following the Chinese invasion of Tibet.

The Dalai Lama conferred on them the full powers of the government of Tibet. In his autobiography Freedom in Exile, the Dalai Lama writes that with the agreement of Lukhangwa, Lobsang Tashi and the Kashag, he sent delegations to the United States, England and Nepal in the late 1950s in the hope of an intervention for Tibet, as well as in China to negotiate its withdrawal. Shortly after, when the Chinese presence strengthened in the east, the Dalai Lama and the main members of the government left to settle in the south of Tibet, in Yatung, 300km from Sikkim in India. Lukhangwa and Lobsang Tashi remained in Lhasa. Shortly after his arrival in Yatung, it turned out that of the delegations, the only one to have arrived at his destination was the one sent to China. From Chamdo, Ngapoi Ngawang Jigme sent a long report to the Tibetan government explaining that unless an agreement was reached, Lhasa would be attacked by the People's Liberation Army (PLA), resulting in many deaths. For Ngapoi, it was necessary to negotiate, and he proposed to go to Beijing with some deputies to start a dialogue with the Chinese. Lukhangwa and Lobsang Tashi believed that such negotiations should have taken place in Lhasa, but the desperate situation left no choice. The Dalai Lama therefore sent Ngapoi to Beijing with two personalities from Lhasa and two from Yatung, hoping that he would make it clear to the Chinese authorities that the Tibetans did not want "liberation", but only the continuation of good relations with China.

Lukhangwa and Lobsang Tashi became advocates of Tibetan freedom as soon as the PLA arrived in Lhasa, opposing attempts by Chinese generals to encroach on the rights of the Dalai Lama.

At a meeting in early 1952, General Zhang Jingwu announced the absorption of Tibetan Army troops into the PLA, citing Article 8 of the 17-point agreement. Lukhangwa replied that the Tibetans did not accept the 17-point agreement, which was not respected by the Chinese, asking the reason for this decision, whereas according to the agreement, the Tibetans were free to choose. Perplexed, General Chang changed his method, suggesting replacing the Tibetan flag of the Tibetan barracks with the Chinese flag. Lukhangwa replied that in this case, the Tibetans would remove the Chinese flag, which would embarrass the Chinese.

Three days later Fan Ming, another Chinese general, asked Lukhangwa if he had been mistaken in his previous statements. As he reiterated them, the Chinese general accused him of having relations with foreign imperialist powers and shouted that he would ask the Dalai Lama to remove him.

At the request of the Chinese generals, the two Tibetan prime ministers, Lukhangwa and Lobsang Tashi were dismissed by the Dalai Lama on April 27, 1952.

After his ouster, Lobsang Tashi again devoted himself to Tibetan Buddhism.

== Incarceration and death ==
After the departure of the 14th Dalai Lama in 1959, Lobsang Tashi was incarcerated in Drapchi Prison and died in 1966.

In his first autobiography, My Land and My People, published in 1962, the Dalai Lama wrote that, to his regret, Lobsang Tashi was imprisoned in Tibet.

In his book The Fire in the Snow, Palden Gyatso mentions that when he arrived at Drapchi Prison in 1964, Lobsang Tashi was incarcerated there in the 5th brigade which housed former Tibetan government officials and high lamas. When Palden Gyatso is transferred to the old and grim Seitru prison, he also mentions that Lobsang Tashi, like many famous Tibetans, was housed there.

== Depiction in the film Kundun ==
In the film Kundun directed by Martin Scorsese, the role of Lobsang Tashi is played by Tibetan actor Ngawang Kaldan.

== See also ==
- Political Prisoners Movement of Tibet (association of former Tibetan political prisoners)
