= Tan Guansan =

Chinese military officer and politician

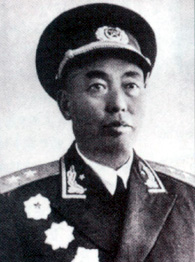
- Born: January 31, 1901; Leiyang City, Hunan Province
- Died: December 6, 1985 (aged 84); Chengdu, Sichuan
- Burial place: Lhasa, Tibet
- Military career
- Allegiance: China
- Branch: People's Liberation Army; Chinese Red Army
- Conflicts: Chinese Civil War; Second Sino-Japanese War; 1959 Tibetan uprising

Tan Guansan (31 January 1901 – 6 December 1985; Chinese: 谭冠三; pinyin: Tán Guānsān) was a Chinese military officer and politician. He is notable for his role in the 1959 Tibetan uprising, where he led the Chinese People's Liberation Army against the Tibetan rebels.

== Biography ==
=== Republic of China ===
Tan Guansan was a leader of the peasant movement in southern Hunan province. He joined the Young Communist League in 1926 and became a member of the Chinese Communist Party that same year, serving as secretary of the Party League for the Second District of Leiyang County and as a representative of the District Red Guard. He participated in the 1928 uprising in southern Hunan and later accompanied the army to Jinggangshan Mountains, where he worked as a clerk in the quartermaster's office of the Red Army and took part in defending the revolutionary base there. In early 1929, he joined the army in campaigns in southern Jiangxi and western Fujian, subsequently serving as the director of the Political Department of the 1st Red Army Corps, the director of the Political Department of the Army Corps, and director of the Inspection Corps.

In October 1934, Tan Guansan joined the main forces of the Central Red Army on the Long March, holding roles such as secretary of the Military Magistracy of the 1st Red Army Corps, secretary of the General Party Branch of the Sixth Regiment of the 2nd Red Division, and director of the Political Office of the Fourth Brigade of the Shaanxi-Gansu Detachment. After reaching northern Shaanxi, he became the political commissar of the 242nd Regiment of the 81st Division of the 15th Army Corps of the Red First Front, participating in the battles of Zhiluozhen and the East March, among others. In 1936, he enrolled at the Anti-Japanese Red Army University for further studies.

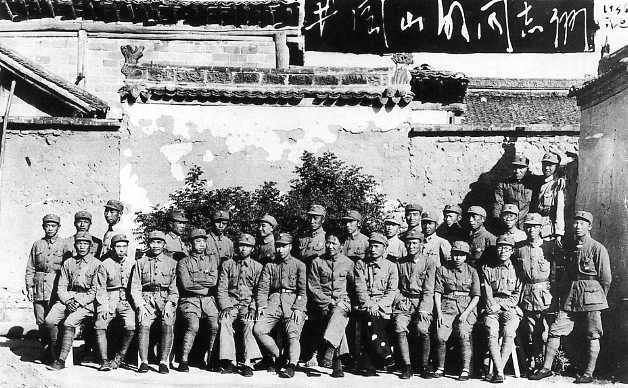
Some of the participants in the Jinggangshan Struggle were photographed in Yan'an in 1938, with Tan Guansan in the second front row from the left.

After the outbreak of the Second Sino-Japanese War, Tan Guansan served as the director of the Political Department of the Anti-Japanese Military University and head of the Secretary's Section. In late 1938, he was stationed in Jizhong as deputy director of the Political Department of the 3rd Column of the Eighth Route Army and the Jizhong Military Region, as well as Political Commissar of the 1st Military Sub-District and the 7th Detachment. In 1940, he became the Political Commissar of the Southward-Advancing Detachment, leading his troops in anti-Japanese guerrilla warfare in the border areas of Ji-Lu-Yu. In 1943, Tan Guansan entered the Party School of the CPC Central Committee for further training.

After the victory in the Anti-Japanese War, Tan Guansan became the director of the Political Department of the Jizhong Column and secretary of the CPC Runan Work Committee. In the spring of 1946, he moved to the Yu-Wan-Su area and assumed the roles of Political Commissar of the 8th Military Sub-District of the Yu-Wan-Su Military Region and secretary of the local CPC committee, participating in the battle of Handan, battle of Lunan, and Huaihai campaign. In 1949, Tan Guansan was appointed Political Commissar of the 18th Army of the Second Field Army, leading his troops in major campaigns such as the Yangtze River Crossing campaign, the Battle of Hengbao, and the Battle of Southwest China.

=== People's Republic of China ===
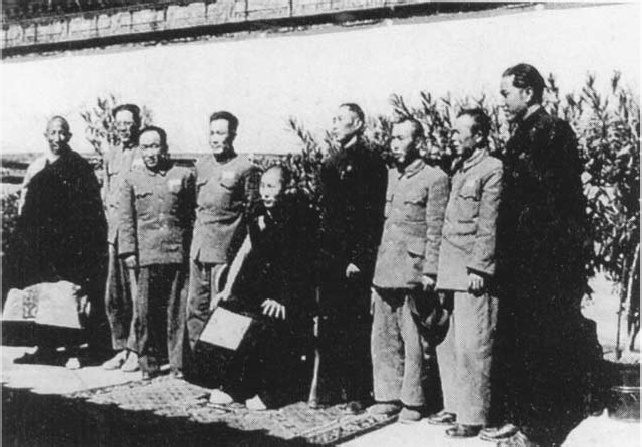
Leaders of the Tibet Work Committee visiting the Dalai Lama at Norbulingka, Lhasa in November 1951. Tan Guansan is the third from the right.

In January 1950, Mao Zedong reached out to Deng Xiaoping and Liu Bocheng from the CPC Southwest Bureau, requesting a plan for a mission commander to lead the march into Tibet. Deng and Liu recommended Zhang Guohua, Commander of the 18th Army, and Tan Guansan, Political Commissar of the 18th Army. With Mao's approval, the 18th Army took charge of the Battle of Chamdo, which was successfully led by Zhang Guohua and Tan Guansan in October 1950. In 1951, the Tibetan authorities signed the Seventeen-Point Agreement with the Central People's Government, and by October of that year, the troops were successfully stationed in Lhasa, completing the annexation of Tibet by the People's Republic of China.

In November 1958, he became a political commissar of the Tibet Military Region of the Chinese People's Liberation Army. After the People's Liberation Army entered Tibet, Tan Guansan led his troops in establishing the Bayi Farm for land reclamation. During the 1959 Tibetan uprising, when the Central Committee's representative Zhang Jingwu and military region commander Zhang Guohua were both attending meetings outside, Tan Guansan was appointed as the acting representative of the Central Committee. In this role, he negotiated with the Dalai Lama and took significant personal risks to ensure the safety of Ngapoi Ngawang Jigme and others. His efforts ultimately played a key role in successfully quelling the rebellion. In December 1959, he became the first chairman of the Tibet Autonomous Regional Committee of the Chinese People's Political Consultative Conference. On September 9, 1965, the Tibet Autonomous Region (TAR) was formally established, with Ngapoi Ngawang Jigme as chairman, Zhang Guohua as First Secretary of the Regional Party Committee, and Tan Guansan as Second Secretary.

In 1966, Tan Guansan was transferred to the position of First Vice-president of the Supreme People's Court of the People's Republic of China in Beijing, and in 1978, he was appointed as an advisor to the Chengdu Military Region. He was also a member of the Standing Committee of the Fourth and Fifth Chinese People's Political Consultative Conference (CPPCC) and died on December 6, 1985, in Chengdu.
