= Dingja Dorje Gyaltsen =

Dingja Dorje Gyaltsen (Tibetan: སྡིང་བྱ་རྡོ་རྗེ་རྒྱལ་མཚན, Wylie: sding-bya rdo-rje rgyal-mtshan) was a Tibetan official of the Kashag and later a member of the Preparatory Committee for the Tibet Autonomous Region. In 1915 he was dispatched by the 13th Dalai Lama on a military mission to India where he studied the use of modern artillery and machine guns. In 1949, as Taiji and a ranked official of the Kashag government, Dorje Gyaltsen was part of a special delegation that was supposed to leave for the United States to gather foreign support in the face of "incoming Chinese communist invasion". However, as Western powers rejected Tibetan calls for help, the delegation was ultimately disbanded before ever leaving Tibet. After the annexation of Tibet by the People's Republic of China, in 1954 Dingja Dorje Gyaltsen was assigned a minor role in the new Tibetan Foreign Affairs Office installed by the Chinese Communist Party. After the 1959 Tibetan uprising, as the Kashag was formally abolished, Dingja Dorje Gyaltsen was promoted to membership of the Preparatory Committee for the Tibet Autonomous Region, the governing body of what would later become the Tibet Autonomous Region.
