= Tibet Area (administrative division) =

Province claimed by China, 1912–1965

Tibet Area 西藏地方 བོད་ལྗོངས
- Area of the Republic of China (1912–1951); Area of the People's Republic of China (1951–1965)
- 1912–1965
- Map of the de jure Tibet Area within the ROC
- Capital: Lhasa
- Area
  - 1953: 1,221,600 km^{2} (471,700 sq mi)
- Population
  - 1953: 1,274,969
- History
  - Tibet Area claimed by the ROC Provisional Government: 1 January 1912
  - Established: 1912
  - Seventeen Point Agreement: 23 May 1951
  - Replacement of Kashag with the Preparatory Committee for the Tibet Autonomous Region after the 1959 Tibetan rebellion: 1959
  - Sino-Indian War: 20 October 1962
  - Establishment of the Tibet Autonomous Region: 22 April 1965
Preceded by	Succeeded by
Tibet under Qing rule; Tibet	Tibet Autonomous Region
- Today part of: China ∟ Tibet Autonomous Region

The Tibet Area (Chinese: 西藏地方; pinyin: Xīzàng Dìfāng, also translated as Tibet Region in the 1954 Sino-Indian Agreement) was a province-level administrative division of China in the 20th century. It was de jure created after the establishment of the Republic of China in 1912, and nominally includes the Ü-Tsang (central Tibet) and Ngari (western Tibet) areas, but not the Amdo and Kham areas. The territories were merely claimed by the ROC, but actually controlled by an independent Tibet with a government headed by the Dalai Lama in Lhasa. At this time, the scope of de facto independent Tibet included the "Tibet area" and the Chamdo area west of the Jinsha River, which claimed by China. The ROC retreated to Taiwan and lost control of mainland China to the People's Republic of China (PRC) in 1949; afterwards, the ROC continued to claim Tibet.

The PRC annexed Tibet in 1951. Tibet merged with the Chamdo Region and was transformed to Tibet Autonomous Region in 1965 after the 1959 Tibetan uprising.

== Background ==
=== Early-Republican China ===
Tibet became a protectorate of Qing China in the 18th century; imperial authority was symbolized by a Qing resident called amban in Lhasa. After the Chinese 1911 Revolution and the end of the Qing Empire, Tibet expelled the Chinese delegation and became independent. The ROC claimed Tibet as a province. It considered Tibet be part of the "Five Races under One Union" and held that "Tibet was placed under the sovereignty of China" following the Sino-Nepalese War (1788–1792). The Nationalist government's Mongolian and Tibetan Affairs Commission (MTAC) was established in 1928 to nominally govern those regions. In 1934, diplomatic relations between Tibet and China resumed. ROC proposed that Tibet recognize Chinese sovereignty. Tibet rejected the proposal but agreed to host a Chinese mission in Lhasa; a MTAC mission was established in 1939. It was expelled in July 1949 to make it more difficult for the Chinese Communists to establish an official presence.

=== Relations with the People's Republic of China ===
The PRC received early insight into the politics of Tibet by recruiting from MTAC members after the Kuomintang was defeated during the Chinese Civil War. In 1949, Tibet opened negotiations with the Chinese Communists, who were expected to win the civil war, and through them, with the future PRC. As with the ROC, Tibet refused to accept Communist demands that Tibet recognize Chinese sovereignty. Following some border skirmishes, the PRC invaded Tibet in October 1950; the Chinese defeated the Tibetans at the Battle of Chamdo, Chamdo being part of Xikang rather than Tibet Area from the Chinese point of view. They stopped to allow further negotiations. Tibet was unable to secure international support, and military resistance was hopeless. In 1951, the PRC formally annexed Tibet through the Seventeen Point Agreement. In the first few years, the Chinese focused on creating an administration independent of the Tibetan government; the latter was unable to cope with the work demanded by the Chinese and became increasingly redundant. Social reform was not emphasized due to the difference in culture and the dependence of PRC institutions on local resources. Basic services, trade, and technology were introduced to win over the population and the ruling elite. Tibetan opposition built around the two prime ministers of the Tibetan government, and was strengthened by the Chinese criticism of those officers.

The Preparatory Committee for the Autonomous Region of Tibet (PCART) was formed in 1955 as an interim governing body. It replaced the Chinese Tibet Military Commission, which frequently opposed the Tibetan government and was viewed with hostility by the Tibetans. The PRC hoped that Tibetan integration would be easier with the Chinese–Tibetan PCART. The relevance of the native Tibetan government continued to erode; the Kashag continued to meet but its influence was mainly symbolic.

The Tibet Autonomous Region was created in 1965 after the 1959 Tibetan uprising.

=== Relations with Taiwan after 1949 ===
After the ROC retreated to Taiwan, the ROC government continues to claim Tibet as part of its territory per Article 4 of its 1947 Constitution.

Chiang Kai-shek responded to the 1959 uprising with a Letter to Tibetan Compatriots (Chinese: 告西藏同胞書; pinyin: Gào Xīzàng Tóngbāo Shū), which set the ROC's policy of aiding Tibetan rebels against the PRC. ROC continued to operate MTAC, which undertook propaganda work among the Tibetan diaspora in India. In the following years, 400 Tibetans were recruited to work and study in Taiwan.

The ROC's attitude on Tibet started to shift after the former's democratization in mid-1990s. In 2007, ROC President Chen Shui-bian spoke at the International Symposium on Human Rights in Tibet and stated that his offices no longer treated exiled Tibetans as Chinese mainlanders. In 2017, the Tsai Ing-wen administration announced that MTAC would be dissolved and its remaining functions transferred to the Department of Hong Kong, Macao, Inner Mongolia, and Tibet Affairs of the Mainland Affairs Council as well as the Ministry of Foreign Affairs. However, despite the shift in attitude, the current day ROC government continues to regulate its affairs with Tibet as part of Mainland China under the Cross-Strait Act, on the basis it is part of "areas under control of the Chinese Communists."

== Administrative divisions ==
=== 1956–1959 ===
- Administrative divisions setup by the Preparatory Committee for the Tibet Autonomous Region

Flag of the Preparatory Committee for the Tibet Autonomous Region (中央代表团 (Central (Government) Representative Team))

Division (专区)	Tibetan	Simplified Chinese	Hanyu Pinyin	County (宗)
Lhasa Division Office		拉萨办事处	Lāsà Bànshìchù	9 counties
Xigazê Division Office		日喀则办事处	Rìkāzé Bànshìchù	12 counties
Nagqu Division Office		黑河办事处	Hēihé Bànshìchù	4 counties
Ngari Division Office		阿里办事处	Ālǐ Bànshìchù	8 counties
Lhoka Division Office		山南办事处	Shānnán Bànshìchù	10 counties
Dakong Division Office		塔工办事处	Tǎgōng Bànshìchù	6 counties
Gyangzê Division Office		江孜办事处	Jiāngzī Bànshìchù	6 counties
Qamdo Division Office		昌都办事处	Chāngdū Bànshìchù	18 counties

== See also ==
- Tibet (1912–1951)
- Sino-Tibetan War (1930–1932)
- Qinghai–Tibet War (1932)
- Central Tibetan Administration (established 1959)
- Tibetan sovereignty debate
- Outer Mongolia

== Bibliography ==
- Shakya, Tsering (1999). The Dragon in the Land of Snows. New York, New York: Penguin Compass. ISBN 0140196153.
- Yu, Fu-Lai Tony; Kwan, Diana S. (2020), Social Construction of National Reality: Taiwan, Tibet and Hong Kong, Rowman & Littlefield, ISBN 978-1-4985-9243-7
