= Chinese conquest of Tibet =

Chinese conquest of Tibet can refer to:

- Mongol conquest of Tibet
- Chinese expedition to Tibet (1720)
- Battle of Chamdo or the Annexation of Tibet by the People's Republic of China
