= Dalai Lama's escape from China =

Escape of the 14th Dalai Lama from Tibet

In March 1959, the 14th Dalai Lama escaped from Tibet, together with members of his family and his government. They fled the Chinese authorities, who were suspected of wanting to detain him. From Lhasa, the Tibetan capital, the Dalai Lama and his entourage travelled southwards to Tawang in India, where he was welcomed by the Indian authorities.

== Background ==
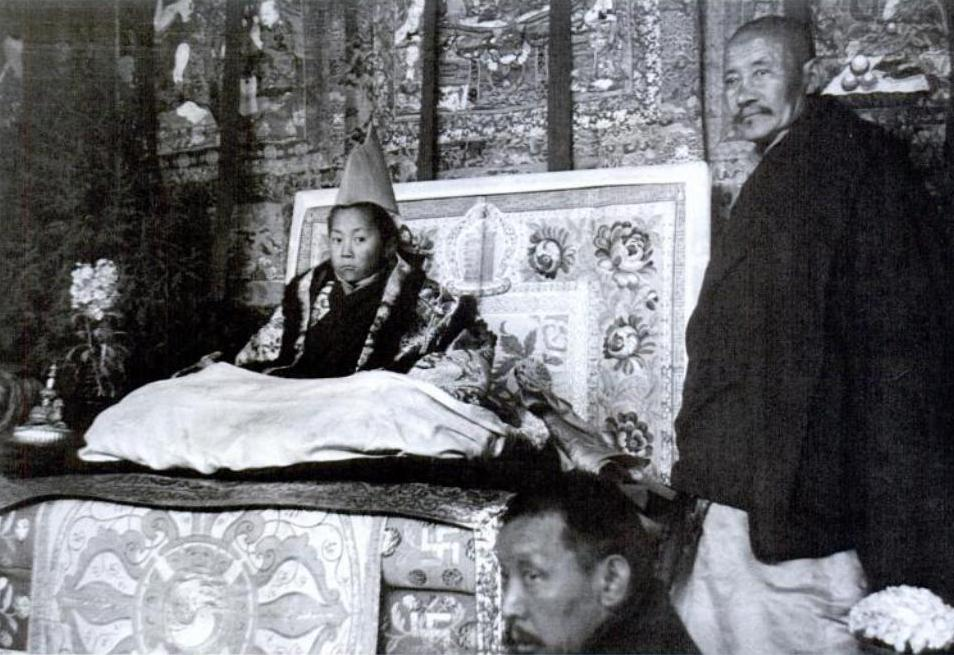
The Dalai Lama in 1942

Following the end of the Qing dynasty, the 13th Dalai Lama declared the independence of Tibet in 1913. This independence was contested by the Chinese government in Beijing which in October 1950, invaded Tibet and seized most of its territory in a military campaign of about two weeks. In the Seventeen Point Agreement of 1951, China and Tibet settled for a return of Tibet under the authority of the Chinese government, but also agreed that Tibet would maintain autonomy. This status quo was challenged by the Chinese government which had installed virtual Chinese control over large areas which were supposed to be ruled by the Tibetan authorities. The Tibetans appealed to the United Nations, urging them to facilitate negotiations with China, a demand which they later repealed in the hope China and Tibet could find a solution independently.

=== Siege of Lhasa ===
By 10 March 1959, the Chinese military forces had surrounded Lhasa, the Tibetan capital. The same day, the Dalai Lama received an invitation to attend a Chinese dance show from the Chinese military officer Zhang Jingwu. This was followed by a demand to come to the Chinese military headquarters without any accompanying bodyguards or soldiers. The Tibetan government worried that the Chinese planned to arrest the then 23-year old Dalai Lama. After this, large crowds surrounded the Potala and Norbulingka palace in protest at the Chinese authorities and demanded the Dalai Lama should not follow the invitation. Subsequently, the Tibetan State Oracle was consulted about what should be done which suggested the Dalai Lama should stay and negotiate with the Chinese authorities. The Dalai Lama was not sure whether to trust this result and made his own divination, then consulted the Oracle twice more. The second consultation produced the same result, but when the Oracle was consulted for a third time, it urged the Dalai Lama to flee the same night. According to the Dalai Lama, the Oracle's prophecy was followed by the shelling of the gardens of the Norbulingka.

== Escape over the Himalayas ==
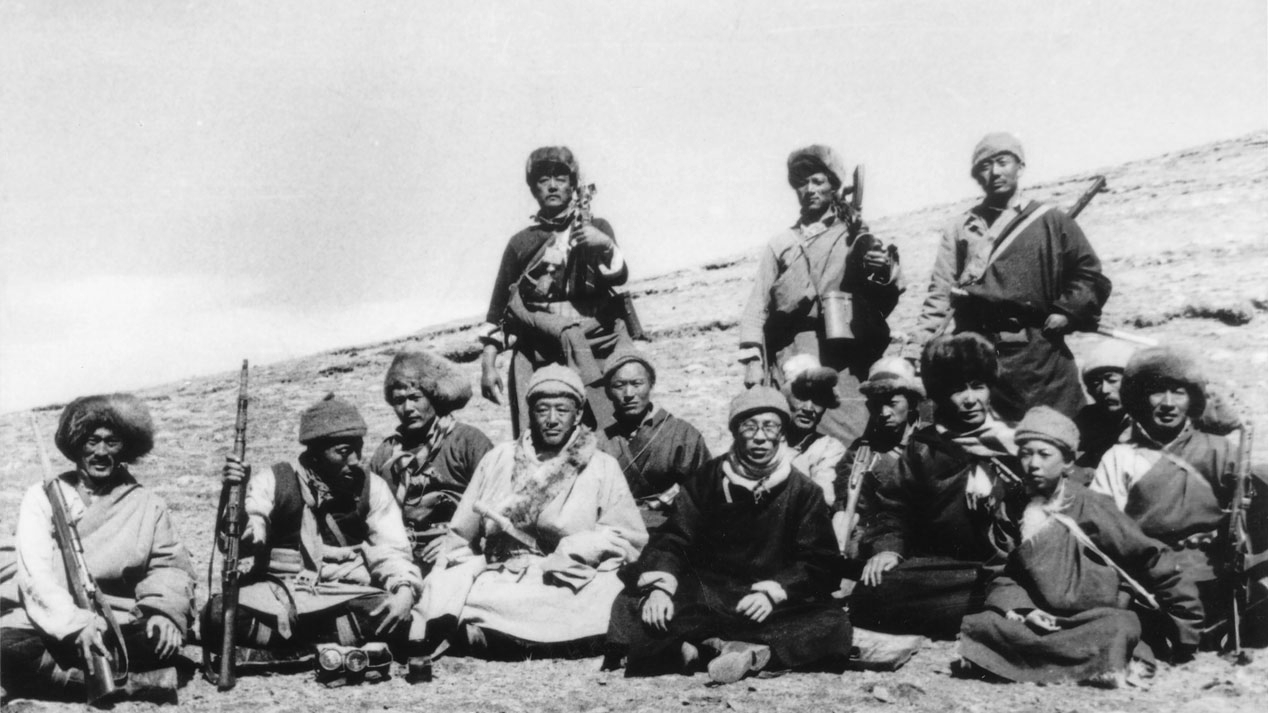
The Dalai Lama during his flight to exile across the Himalayas

The Oracle wrote down a detailed trajectory of the path the Dalai Lama should follow from the Norbulingka palace until he reached the last Tibetan village at the Indian border. The same night, disguised in a uniform of the Chinese Army and in company of a group of twenty people in which his closest family members and ministers of the government were included, the Dalai Lama crossed through the crowds in front of the Norbulingka palace to the Kyuchu river, where they were joined by a larger entourage. From there, they began their journey towards Indian exile which would be reached on the 31 March. During their journey, they travelled mostly by night, spending the days camped at monasteries or camps of the Khamba tribe. The dignitaries were guarded by members of the Tibetan militia. The group was observed but not recognized as they crossed the Kyuchu river during the night of 17 March. The group reached the foot of the Che pass on the morning of the 18 March and headed onwards until crossing the Brahmaputra by ferry. They passed that night in a small Buddhist monastery, where they discussed the route to take. The route through Bhutan seemed the shortest, but worries of an eventual encounter with the Chinese military led them another way. On 19 March, they reached a monastery in Chitesho. On 21 March, they crossed the Zsagola pass. This was the day the international community became aware of the flight of the Dalai Lama from Lhasa. On 26 March, the Dalai Lama entered Lhuntse Dzong, from where he sent a letter to Indian prime minister Jawaharlal Nehru, explaining the political situation in Tibet and requesting asylum. In addition, the Central Intelligence Agency, which had forged ties with Tibetan resistance forces, cabled Nehru's office seeking permission for the Dalai Lama's party to cross the border. In response, Nehru sent a detachment of the Assam Rifles to the border post at Khinzemane near Tawang. The Dalai Lama and his entourage crossed the McMahon line, which marked the border between India and China, on 31 March. The same day, Nehru made an announcement in the Indian Parliament, that the Dalai Lama should be treated with respect. The Tibetan Government in Exile was allowed to set up its headquarters in Dharamshala.

== Chinese position on the escape ==
While staying in Wuhan, Mao Zedong ordered that the Dalai Lama should be allowed to leave on 12 March 1959, deeming it beneficial for China and a potential burden for the country which would provide him with asylum. Furthermore, Mao suggested that in the event of a successful escape, the Dalai Lama should be declared a rebels' abductee and that his political rights would be reserved if he decided to return. This stance changed on 16 March, however, when Mao decided that he would prefer to keep the Dalai Lama in China in order to be able to set him free in the future. The Chinese government in Beijing only became aware of his escape from Lhasa on 19 March. After the escape succeeded, the Chinese policy was to portray that the Dalai Lama had been abducted by rebels. But after the main resistance of the Tibetan uprising was crushed by the end of April, the border was sealed, preparing Tibet for an era without the Dalai Lama. In later years, Mao proclaimed a policy in which the Dalai Lama would be welcomed if he returned to China, but only if he adhered to the policies of the Chinese Government.
