= Zhang Jingwu =

Lieutenant general of the People's Liberation Army and Chinese politician

- 张经武
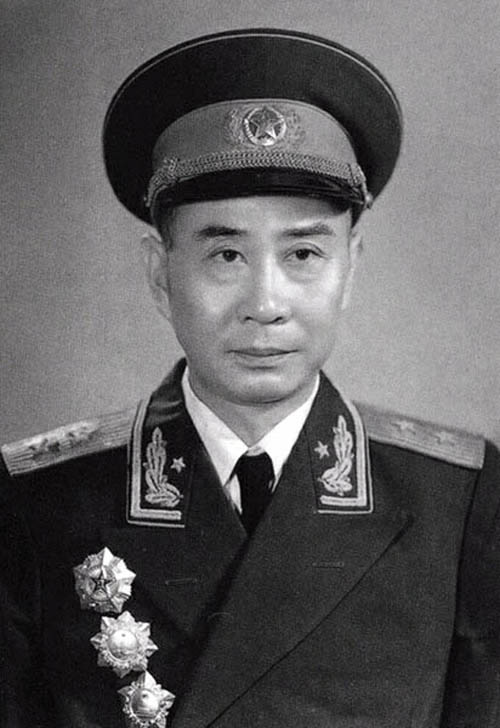

Party Secretary of Tibet
- In office March 1952 – September 1965
- Preceded by: Zhang Guohua
- Succeeded by: Ren Rong

Personal details
- Born: September 3, 1906 Ling County, Hunan, Qing China (now Yanling County, Hunan, China)
- Died: October 27, 1971 (aged 65) Beijing, China
- Party: Chinese Communist Party

Military service
- Allegiance: People's Republic of China
- Branch/service: People's Liberation Army Ground Force
- Years of service: 1930–1971
- Rank: Lieutenant General
- Battles/wars: Second Sino-Japanese War; Chinese Civil War

Zhang Jingwu (Chinese: 张经武) (September 3, 1906 – October 27, 1971) was a Chinese politician and lieutenant general of the People's Liberation Army. He was born in Hunan Province and his birth name was Zhang Renshan (Chinese: 张仁山). He and Zhang Guohua chaired the CCP Tibet Work Committee in 1951. Zhang Jingwu was Chinese Communist Party Committee Secretary of Tibet Autonomous Region from March 1952 to September 1965.

== Biography ==
=== Republic of China ===
Zhang Jingwu was born in 1906 to a peasant family in Xiaguan Village, Shindu Township, Ling County, Hunan Province. In 1919, he enrolled at Hunan No. 3 Teacher Training School in Hengyang, graduating in 1925. From 1926 to 1928, he attended the Nanyang Shanghai Case Backup Army Officers' School (Chinese: 南阳沪案后援建国军军官学校) established by Fan Zhongxiu, and he became a member of the Chinese Communist Party in 1930. Two years later, he arrived at the Jiangxi Soviet Union, where he held several positions: commander of the political battalion of the Ruijin Red Army School, head of the Military Instruction Corps of the Military Commission, commander of the Guangchang Base, deputy director of the Fifth Bureau of the Central Military Commission, and head of the instruction corps of the Huichang Corps.

Throughout the Long March, Zhang held the positions of commander of the instructor division, chief of staff of the second field column of the Military Commission, chief of staff of the third column of the Shaanxi-Gansu detachment, and chief of the second section of the Military Commission, among others. In 1936, Zhang Jingwu returned to Wayaobu and, in June, matriculated in the inaugural section of the Red Army University.

In August 1936, Zhang Jingwu, along with Zhang Chunqing and Tong Xiaopeng, received a new assignment. As a military liaison officer for the Red Army, Zhang Jingwu traveled to North China to conduct operations, during which he encountered Song Zheyuan, a member of the Jicha Political Affairs Committee and Chairman of the Hebei Provincial Government, as well as Han Fuju, Commander of the Third Group of the Kuomintang and Chairman of the Shandong Provincial Government, among others. In April 1937, Zhang Jingwu re-enrolled at Counter-Japanese Military and Political University to participate in the first brigade of the second phase.

In April 1937, Zhang Jingwu returned to Yan'an to participate in the first brigade of the second phase of the Second Sino-Japanese War. Following the onset of the war, Zhang Jingwu journeyed to Jinan to reconvene with Han Fuju, resulting in an accord for Han to liberate the political detainees held by the military justice division of the Third Army. In December 1937, Zhang Jingwu arrived in Hankou and assumed the role of senior staff officer in the Eighth Route Army Office, aiding Zhou Enlai. In August 1938, Zhang Jingwu and Li Yu directed a contingent of twenty individuals from Yan'an to Shandong, where they integrated the local guerrilla forces to establish the Shandong Column of the Eighth Route Army, appointing Zhang Jingwu as the commanding officer and Li Yu as the political commissar. In 1942, Zhang Jingwu assumed the role of Chief of Staff for the Shaanxi-Gansu-Ningxia-Shanxi-Suiyuan Joint Defense Force. Zhang Jingwu participated at the 7th National Congress of the Chinese Communist Party from April 23 to June 11, 1945.

On January 10, 1946, the Nationalists and Communists executed an armistice agreement and established the Executive Department of Military Mediation in Peking. The State, the CCP, and the United States formed a joint staff, with Zhang Jingwu appointed as deputy chief of staff for the Chinese contingent, and Luo Ruiqing serving as chief of staff. In mid-March 1946, as a member of the four-person executive team, he traveled to the Northeast to examine the Northeast conflict. The CCP Central Committee convened an expanded conference of the Front Committee (known as the Xiaohe meeting), from July 21 to 23, 1947, he attended this meeting there. The Northwest Military Region, with Zhang Jingwu continuing as chief of staff, rebranded the Shaanxi-Gansu-Ningxia-Jinsui-Jianzhu Joint Defense Force Area on February 1, 1949. On May 29, during the conquest of Xi'an, Zhang Jingwu held the position of Xi'an City Commander. On September 25, 1949, the CCP Northwest Military Region was formed, with Zhang Jingwu serving as the second deputy secretary, while He Long and Xi Zhongxun held the positions of secretary and first deputy secretary, respectively.

=== People's Republic of China ===
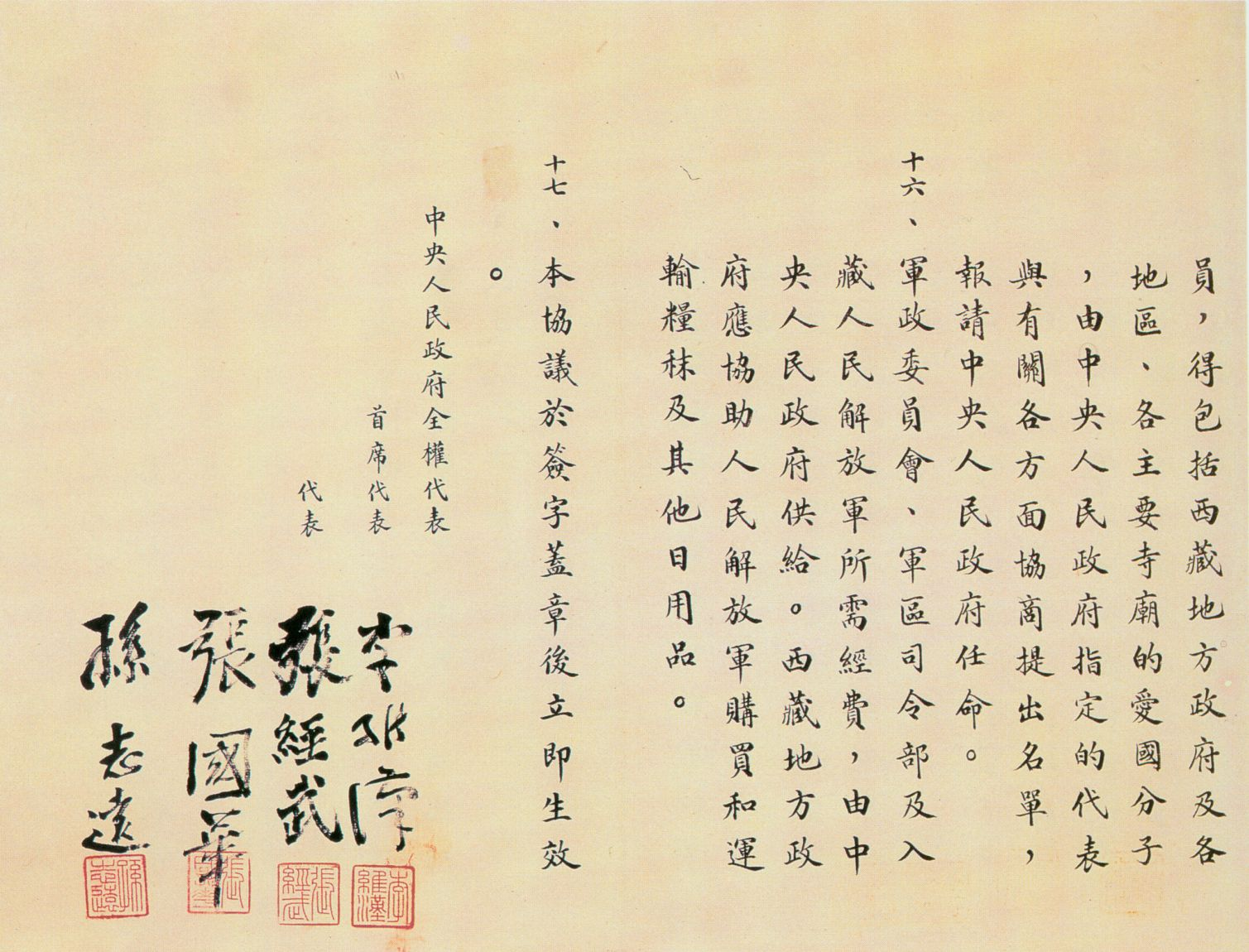
Zhang Jingwu's signature on the Seventeen Point Agreement

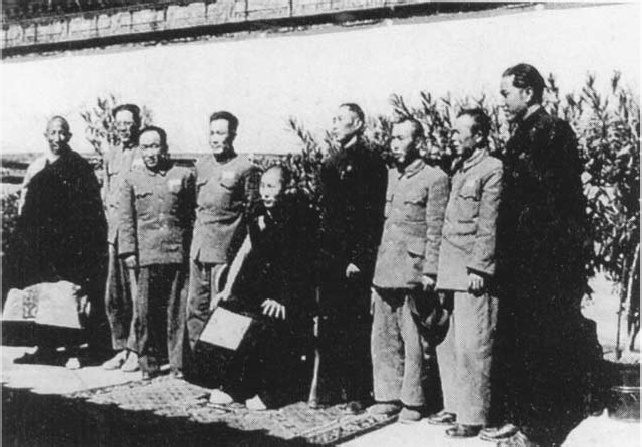
Leaders of the Tibet Work Committee visiting the Dalai Lama at Norbulingka Palace, Lhasa, November 1951 (Fourth from the right is Zhang)

Zhang Jingwu received his assignment to the Southwest Military Region on November 19, 1949, with the aim of easing the advance into Tibet. In June 1950, Chairman Mao Zedong appointed him as the Minister of the People's Armed Forces Department of the People's Revolutionary Military Commission of the Central People's Government. On September 19, Chairman Mao Zedong designated him as the Director of the General Office of the Central Military Commission. In October, the Chinese Communist Party achieved victory in the Battle of Chamdo, in which he played a significant role in both the strategic deployment and leadership. Zhang Jingwu, representing the Central Government, participated in negotiations with Kashag delegates from April 29 to May 21, 1951, and formulated the parameters of the agreement. Both parties signed the Seventeen Point Agreement on May 23.

In June 1951, Zhang Jingwu, representing the Central Government in Tibet, transferred planes via Singapore, then proceeded through Calcutta and Kalimpong in India, arriving in Yadong, Tibet on July 16 to confer with the 14th Dalai Lama and present the agreement. On September 28, Zhang Jingwu formally met the Dalai Lama and presented a gift from Mao Zedong to the Lama. On December 1, more than 1,100 members of the 18th Army, led by Fan Ming, reached Lhasa from Qinghai. On December 20, the two contingents convened a reunion meeting in the Potala Palace Square. Zhang Jingwu announced the list of appointees and constituted the Tibet Military Region on February 10, 1952. The Work Committee of Tibet concurrently appointed Zhang Jingwu as its secretary on March 7.

In late 1953 and early 1954, Zhang Guohua and Fan Ming attended a seminar in Beijing regarding Tibetan affairs, while Zhang Jingwu was absent. On July 15, Zhang Jingwu accompanied the Dalai Lama in departing Lhasa, arriving in Beijing on September 4 to participate in the First National People's Congress. On September 11, Zhang accompanied the Dalai Lama and the Panchen Lama in a meeting with Chairman Mao Zedong. In 1955, the central government resolved to retain Zhang Jingwu in Beijing. On March 9, during the seventh plenary session of the State Council, Zhang Jingwu delivered a report on local affairs in Tibet. On July 30, Chairman Mao Zedong designated Zhang Jingwu as the Director of the General Office of the President of the People's Republic of China, while also appointing him as the representative in Tibet and secretary of the Tibetan Work Committee. On September 27, Zhang received the rank of zhongjiang (Lieutenant General) of the People's Liberation Army (PLA), along with the First Class of the August 1 Medal, the First Class of the Order of Independence and Freedom, and the First Class of the Order of Liberation.

In March 1956, Zhang Jingwu accompanied Vice Premier Chen Yi, who led a delegation to Tibet to commend the establishment of the Preparatory Committee for the Tibet Autonomous Region. The Preparatory Committee held its inaugural meeting from April 22 to May 1. The Tibet Military District designated him as its first political commissar in 1957, and officially appointed him on January 1, 1960.

In 1964, for health reasons, the CCP Central Committee resolved that Zhang Jingwu should remain in Beijing to work and continue his role as the first secretary of the CCP Work Committee for Tibet. In September 1965, upon the establishment of the Tibet Autonomous Region, Zhang Jingwu, as the representative of the Central People's Government in Tibet, the first secretary of the CCP Work Committee for Tibet, the secretary of the CCP Central Committee's Southwest Bureau, and a deputy head of the Central Delegation, accompanied Xie Fuzhi, the head of the delegation, to Lhasa to congratulate Tibet on the founding of the autonomous region. The Central Delegation traveled to Lhasa to commend the establishment of the Tibet Autonomous Region, marking his final return to Tibet. In 1965, the CCP Central Committee reinstated Zhang Jingwu as the First Deputy Minister of the United Front Work Department, following his resignation as secretary of the Workers' Committee.

Zhang Jingwu served as a delegate at the 7th National Congress of the Chinese Communist Party. He served as a deputy in the First and Second National People's Congresses and was a member of the Standing Committee of the Third National People's Congress. In 1966, during the Eleventh Plenary Session of the Eighth Central Committee of the CCP, the Central Committee incorporated him as an alternative member. In the spring of 1967, Lin Biao and the Gang of Four unlawfully detained Zhang Jingwu, imposing the accusation of "counter-revolutionary in progress" upon him. Zhang Jingwu succumbed to injustice on October 27, 1971.

On September 27, 1979, the CCP Central Committee and the Central Military Commission convened a memorial meeting for Zhang Jingwu in the auditorium of the National Committee of the Chinese People's Political Consultative Conference. Hu Yaobang presented a eulogy on behalf of the CCP Central Committee and the Central Military Commission.
