= Zhang Guohua (politician, born 1914) =

Chinese general and politician (1914–1972)

- 张国华
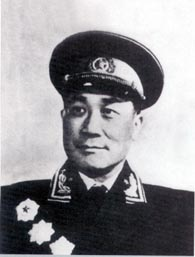
- Zhang Guohua in 1955

Party Secretary of Tibet
- In office 24 January 1950 – February 1952
- Preceded by: None (Post Created)
- Succeeded by: Fan Ming
- In office 1965–1967
- Preceded by: Zhang Jingwu
- Succeeded by: Ren Rong

Governor of Sichuan
- In office 1968–1972
- Preceded by: Li Dazhang
- Succeeded by: Liu Xingyuan

Commander of Chengdu Military Region
- In office 1952–1965

Personal details
- Born: October 22, 1914 Yongxin County, Jiangxi, China
- Died: February 21, 1972 (aged 57) Xindu, Chengdu, China
- Party: Chinese Communist Party

Military service
- Allegiance: People's Republic of China
- Branch/service: People's Liberation Army Ground Force
- Years of service: 1931–1972
- Rank: Lieutenant General
- Commands: Field commander during Sino-Indian War
- Battles/wars: Long March, World War 2, Chinese Civil War, Invasion of Tibet, Sino-Indian War

Zhang Guohua (simplified Chinese: 张国华; traditional Chinese: 張國華; pinyin: Zhāng Guóhuá; Wade–Giles: Chang Kuo-hua; October 22, 1914－February 21, 1972) was a Chinese lieutenant general and a politician, serving during the invasion of Tibet and the Sino-Indian War and later as a Chinese Communist Party Committee Secretary for the Tibet Autonomous Region.

== Biography ==
=== First Kuomintang-Communist Civil War ===
Zhang Guohua was born into a poor family in Guanshan Village, Huaizhong Town, Yongxin County, Jiangxi Province. In his early years, he attended private school for more than four years, but dropped out due to family poverty. In 1929, during the first civil war between the CCP and Kuomintang, Zhang Guohua, at the age of fifteen, joined the guerrilla force of the Northwest Special Zone of Yongxin under the leadership of the CCP, and was integrated into Wang Zuo's (Chinese: 王佐) department, where he served as the head of the bugle squad. During the anti-siege battles in the Central Soviet Area, Zhang was wounded many times and was awarded the Third Class Red Star Medal by the Central Military Commission. 1930, Zhang joined the Young Communist League and became a member of the Chinese Communist Party in 1931. In October 1934, Zhang Guohua took part in the Long March with the Red First Frontier Army (Chinese: 红一方面军), and in October 1935, he arrived in Shaanxi Province.

In the spring of 1936, Zhang Guohua crossed the Yellow River with the Red Army to take part in the Eastern Campaign, creating the Hedong Guerrilla Detachment in southwestern Shanxi, with Zhang Guohua serving as the director of the political department.

=== Second Sino-Japanese War ===
In August 1938, Zhang Guohua accompanied the 115th Division of the Eighth Route Army eastward across the Yellow River to carry out the guerrilla war in western Shanxi, and served as the president of the Warrior Drama Club of the Political Department of the 115th Division, the head of the Education Unit, and the director of the Political Office of the 115th Division's Direct Subsidiary Unit.

In December 1938, Zhang Guohua went with his troops into Shandong. In January 1939, the Japanese invasion of China into the Taihang Mountains after the local sweep, Zhang Guohua led two companies of troops directly under the composition of the Ruxi working group, in Yuncheng-Heze area established the Western Shandong Anti-Japanese Base, with the formation of the seventh anti-Japanese detachment where he served as political commissar. On August 2, Zhang Guohua led his troops in Yuncheng northeast of Liangshan ambush a brigade of Japanese 5th Division, eliminating more than 600 Japanese troops.

In April 1940, the Luxi Military District (Chinese: 鲁西军区) was established, and Zhang Guohua became the political commissar of the Yellow River Detachment. Later, the Yellow River Detachment was reorganized into the Fourth Brigade of Instruction of the 115th Division and the Huxi Military Region was established. Under the leadership of Zhang, the army and people of Huxi area worked together against the Japanese army's sweep. They won successively in battles such as the Da Mangzhuang Battle, the Neihuang Battle, the Da Ming Battle, and the Weinan Battle.

=== Second Kuomintang-Communist Civil War ===
In September 1945, Zhang Guohua was transferred to be the deputy political commissar and director of the political department of the first column of the Shanxi-Hebei-Henan field army In November 1945, Zhang became deputy political commissar of the 7th Column, and in November 1946, he led his troops into the Henan-Anhui-Jiangsu area, where he served as commander of the Henan-Anhui-Jiangsu military region and cooperated with Liu-Deng's army.

In June 1948, the Henan-Anhui-Jiangsu Military Region was upgraded to a first-class military region, with Su Yu as the commander and Zhang Guohua as the deputy commander. Subsequently, Zhang Guohua led his troops to participate in the Huaihai campaign. In December 1948, Zhang Guohua was ordered to lead five regiments of the Henan-Anhui-Jiangsu military region into the line of Baojiaji and Gaowangji, assisting the Sixth Column of the East China Field Army and the Second Column of the Central Plains Field Army, and succeeded in blocking the two regiments of Li Yannian (6th Army) and Liu Ruming (8th Army) and Chiang Ching-kuo's Tank Chariot Regiment from assisting the Huang Wei Regiment (12th Army) to the west. On February 18, 1949, by order of the Central Military Commission, the 18th Army of the Fifth Corps of the Second Field Army of the People's Liberation Army (PLA) was formed, and Zhang Guohua was appointed as the commander of the Army. Since then, Zhang Guohua led the 18th Army to participate in the Yangtze River Crossing campaign and the Battle of Hengbao.

=== Tibet ===
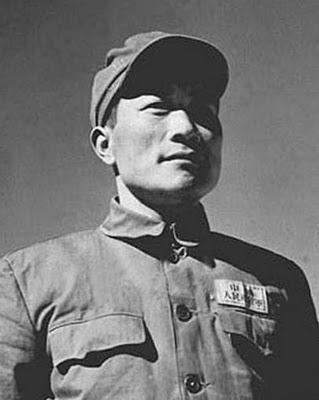
Zhang Guohua about 1950

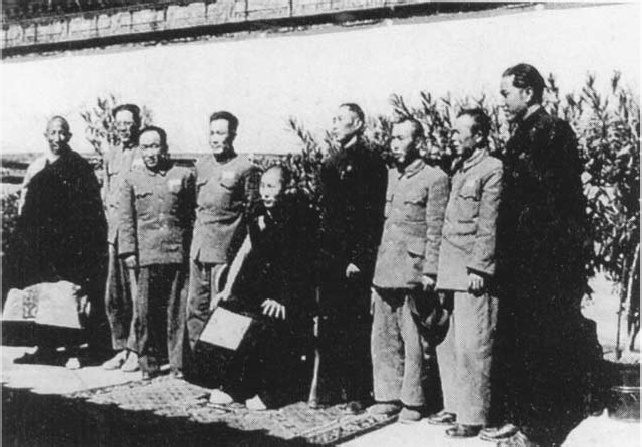
Leaders of the Tibet Work Committee visiting the Dalai Lama at Norbulingka Palace, Lhasa, November 1951. From left: Jigyab Khembo Ngawang Namgye, Li Jue, Wang Qimei, Zhang Guohua, the 14th Dalai Lama, Zhang Jingwu, Tan Guansan, Liu Zhengguo, and Phünwang.

On January 2, 1950, Mao Zedong, who was still visiting the Soviet Union, telephoned the CCP Southwest Bureau (Chinese: 中共中央西南局), requesting the formation of a leading organ for operating Tibet. The CCP Southwest Bureau then reported to the Central Committee of the Chinese Communist Party that the 18th Army would be the main body responsible for advancing into Tibet, and proposed the establishment of a Tibet Working Committee, with Zhang Guohua, Tan Guansan (Chinese: 谭冠三), Wang Qimei (Chinese: 王其梅), Chang Shuanggui (Chinese: 昌柄桂), Chen Mingyi (Chinese: 陈明义), Liu Zhenguo (Chinese: 刘振国), and Sanggyai Yexe as members, with Zhang Guohua as secretary, Tan Guansan as deputy secretary. This plan was approved by the Central Committee on January 24, 1950, and the first enlarged meeting of the Party Committee of the 18th Army was held in Leshan, Sichuan Province, from January 27 to 30, announcing the decision of the Central Committee and marking the formal establishment of the CCP Tibet Work Committee. On October 7, 1950, Zhang Guohua commanded the Battle of Chamdo, forcing the Kashag of Tibet to send its representatives to Beijing to conduct negotiations and reach the Seventeen Point Agreement. In October 1951, Zhang Guohua led his troops into Lhasa, Tibet.

On March 7, 1952, the CCP Central Committee telegraphed to the Tibetan Workers' Committee, deciding that Zhang Jingwu became the secretary, Zhang Guohua the first deputy secretary, Tan Guansan the second deputy secretary, and Fan Ming the third deputy secretary. In 1955, Zhang Guohua was awarded the rank of Lieutenant General.

=== Sino-Indian War ===
On October 10, 1962, Zhang attended a meeting of military leaders outside Beijing. There, he endorsed the summary by Zhou Enlai that because India chose to occupy disputed territory with China, instead of peacefully resolving the border demarcation with it like Nepal, Burma, and Mongolia, that "Nehru has closed all roads. This leaves us only with war." As the Commander of the Tibet military region, Zhang was present for the formal decision to go to war with India in "self-defense" at the politburo meeting of October 18. Mao raised some issues with the plan, and suggested that they were underestimating the Indian Armed Forces, but Zhang reassured him.

Zhang was the People's Liberation Army Ground Force field commander during the Sino-Indian War. The entire Sino-Indian War was divided into two parts, the Eastern Front and the Western Front, of which the Western Front was the main battlefield, commanded by the Frontier Command Post of the Tibet Military Region, with Zhang Guohua, Commander of the Tibet Military Region, and Vice-Commanders Deng Shaodong (Chinese: 邓少东), Chen Mingyi, and Zhao Wenzhen (Chinese: 赵文进) as the main commanders. In October 1962, the PLA carried out the Battle of Kekjerang, which completely wiped out the 7th Indian Army Infantry Brigade. In November he led his troops in the launching of the Xishankou-Bangdila, which totally annihilated the 62nd Indian Infantry Brigade and the 4th Artillery Brigade, and basically wiped out the 48th Indian Infantry Brigade, 65th Indian Infantry Brigade and 67th Indian Infantry Brigade, and pushed the traditional customary line along the Sino-Indian border to seize a major victory in the strategic decisive battle.

=== Sichuan ===
In February 1967, at the beginning of the Cultural Revolution, three divisions of Red Guards tried to oust Zhang Guohua from the Governorship in Lhasa. Using armor, he succeeded in repressing them, and negotiated with the central government to be moved to Sichuan to form a revolutionary committee. In April 1967, he transferred to Sichuan as First Political Commissar of the Chengdu Military Region, First Secretary of the Party Committee of the Chengdu Military Region, Director of the Sichuan Provincial Reform Committee, and Head of the Party Core Group of the Sichuan Provincial Reform Committee.

On February 21, 1972, Zhang Guohua died of a heart attack at the age of 57 in Chengdu, Sichuan Province.

Party political offices
Preceded by Liao Zhigao	Secretary of the CCP Sichuan Provincial Committee; 1971–1972	Succeeded by Liu Xingyuan
Preceded by none	Secretary of the CCP Tibet Committee; 1950–1952	Succeeded by Fan Ming
Preceded by Zhang Jingwu	Secretary of the CCP Tibet Committee; 1965–1967	Succeeded by Ren Rong
Government offices
Preceded by Li Dazhang	Governor of Sichuan; 1968–1972	Succeeded by Liu Xingyuan
