= 1959 Tibetan uprising =

Uprising in Lhasa, Tibet against China

- Part of the Cold War
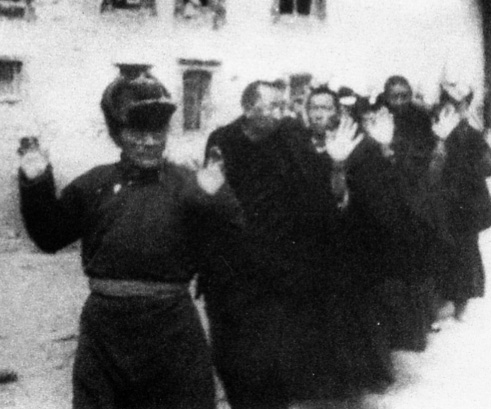
- Tsarong Dazang Dramdul and several Tibetan monks captured by the PLA during the uprising
Date	10–23 March 1959
Location	Lhasa, Tibet Area, China (Note: Amid ongoing rebellion in Kham and Amdo)
Result	Uprising suppressed: Abolition of the Kashag; Tibetan diaspora; Tibetan genocide; Flight of the 14th Dalai Lama to India

Belligerents
Tibetan and Khampa protesters and guerrillas: Remnants of the Tibetan Army; Ongoing rebellion in Kham and Amdo: Chushi Gangdruk; Supported by: Republic of China; United States (CIA)	People's Republic of China: People's Liberation Army

Commanders and leaders
Several leaders	Tan Guansan

Casualties and losses
10,000 deaths (PRIO estimate); 85,000–87,000 deaths (TGIE claim)	2,000 killed

1959 Tibetan uprising
- Traditional Chinese: 1959年西藏起義
- Simplified Chinese: 1959年西藏起义
Transcriptions
Standard Mandarin
- Hanyu Pinyin: 1959 nián Xīzàng qǐyì

1959 Tibetan armed rebellion
- Traditional Chinese: 1959年西藏武裝叛亂
- Simplified Chinese: 1959年西藏武装叛乱
Transcriptions
Standard Mandarin
- Hanyu Pinyin: 1959 nián Xīzàng wǔzhuāng pànluàn

1959 Tibetan anti-riot movement
- Traditional Chinese: 1959年西藏抗暴運動
- Simplified Chinese: 1959年西藏抗暴运动
Transcriptions
Standard Mandarin
- Hanyu Pinyin: 1959 nián Xīzàng kàngbào yùndòng

1959 Tibetan unrests
- Traditional Chinese: 1959年藏區騷亂
- Simplified Chinese: 1959年藏区骚乱
Transcriptions
Standard Mandarin
- Hanyu Pinyin: 1959 nián Zàngqū sāoluàn

The 1959 Tibetan uprising or Lhasa uprising began on 10 March 1959 as a series of protests in the Tibetan capital of Lhasa, fueled by fears that the government of the People's Republic of China planned to arrest the Dalai Lama. Over the next ten days, the demonstrations evolved from expressions of support for the 14th Dalai Lama to demands for independence and the reversal of the 1951 Chinese annexation of Tibet. After protesters acquired weapons, China's People's Liberation Army (PLA) shelled protesters in the Dalai Lama's summer palace and deployed tanks to suppress the demonstrations. Bloody fighting continued for the next three days while the Dalai Lama escaped to India. Thousands of Tibetans were killed during the 1959 uprising, but the exact number is disputed. The 10 March anniversary of the uprising is observed by exiled Tibetans as Tibetan Uprising Day and Women's Uprising Day.

== Armed resistance in Kham and Amdo ==
In 1951, the Seventeen Point Agreement between the People's Republic of China (PRC) and representatives of the Dalai Lama was put into effect. Socialist reforms such as redistribution of land were delayed in Tibet proper. However, eastern Kham and Amdo (western Sichuan / Xikang and Qinghai provinces in the Chinese administrative hierarchy) were outside the administration of the Tibetan government in Lhasa, and were thus treated more like other Chinese provinces, with land redistribution implemented in full. The Khampas and nomads of Amdo traditionally owned their own land. Armed resistance broke out in Amdo and eastern Kham in June 1956.

Prior to the PLA invasion, relations between Lhasa and the Khampa chieftains had deteriorated, although the Khampa remained spiritually loyal to the Dalai Lama throughout. Because of these strained relations, the Khampa had actually assisted the Chinese communists in their initial invasion, before becoming the guerrilla resistance they are now known for. Pandatsang Rapga, a pro-Kuomintang and pro-Republic of China Khampa revolutionary leader, offered the governor of Chamdo, Ngabo Ngawang Jigme, some Khampa fighters in exchange for the Tibetan government recognizing the independence of Kham. Ngabo refused the offer. After the defeat of the Tibetan Army in Chamdo, Rapga started mediating in negotiations between the PRC and the Tibetan rebels. Rapga and Topgay engaged in negotiations with the Chinese during their assault on Chamdo. Khampas either defected to the Chinese PLA forces or did not fight at all. The PLA attack succeeded.

In 1956, armed conflict between Tibetan guerrillas and the PLA started in the Kham and Amdo regions, which had been subjected to socialist reform. Guerrilla warfare later spread to other areas of Tibet. By 1957, Kham was in chaos. Resistance fighters' attacks and People's Liberation Army reprisals against Khampa resistance groups such as the Chushi Gangdruk became increasingly brutal. Kham's monastic networks came to be used by guerrilla forces to relay messages and hide rebels. Punitive strikes were carried out by the Chinese government against Tibetan villages and monasteries. Tibetan exiles assert that threats to bomb the Potala Palace and the Dalai Lama were bluffs made by Chinese military commanders in an attempt to intimidate the guerrilla forces into submission. The Xunhua Incident of April 1958, taking place in Amdo, has been described as a precursor to the later Tibetan uprising.

The Lhasa government continued to abide by the seventeen-point agreement and sent a delegation to Kham to quell the rebellion. After speaking with the rebel leaders, the delegation instead joined the rebellion. Kham leaders contacted the Central Intelligence Agency (CIA), but the CIA under President Dwight D. Eisenhower insisted it required an official request from Lhasa to support the rebels. Lhasa did not act. Eventually the CIA began to provide very limited covert support for the rebellion without word from Lhasa. This CIA support was initially limited to the training of six Khampa militants in 1957, ten militants in 1958, and the delivery of 200 vintage British Lee-Enfield rifles along with radio gear in late 1958.

In mid-February 1959 the Central Committee of the Chinese Communist Party's Administrative Office circulated the Xinhua News Agency internal report on how "the revolts in the Tibetan region have gathered pace and developed into a nearly full-scale rebellion," in a "situation report" for top CCP leaders.

The next day, the Chinese leader saw a report from the PLA General Staff's Operations Department describing rebellions by Tibetans in Sichuan, Yunnan, Gansu, and Qinghai. He again stressed that "rebellions like these are extremely favorable for us because they will benefit us in helping to train our troops, train the people, and provide a sufficient reason to crush the rebellion and carry out comprehensive reforms in the future".

The PLA used Hui soldiers, who formerly had served under Ma Bufang to crush the Tibetan revolt in Amdo. Hui cavalry were stationed in Southern Kham. The situation in all of Tibet became increasingly tense, as a growing number of Tibetans began to support the Khampa uprising, while "anti-Chinese communist agitation" spread among the Tibetans. The regional government in Lhasa neither wanted to back a rebellion nor publicly oppose it. Dissatisfied, the Chinese Communist Party put pressure on the Dalai Lama's government to join the operations against the rebels, and made it increasingly clear that a spread of the insurgency would lead to "all-out repression" in Tibet. In this unstable situation, the Chinese generals resident in Lhasa was summoned back to mainland China, leaving the inexperienced PLA commander Tan Guansan in charge, just as the date of the Monlam Prayer Festival approached. This festival had previously been used by participants to voice "anti-Chinese sentiments".

== Lhasa uprising ==
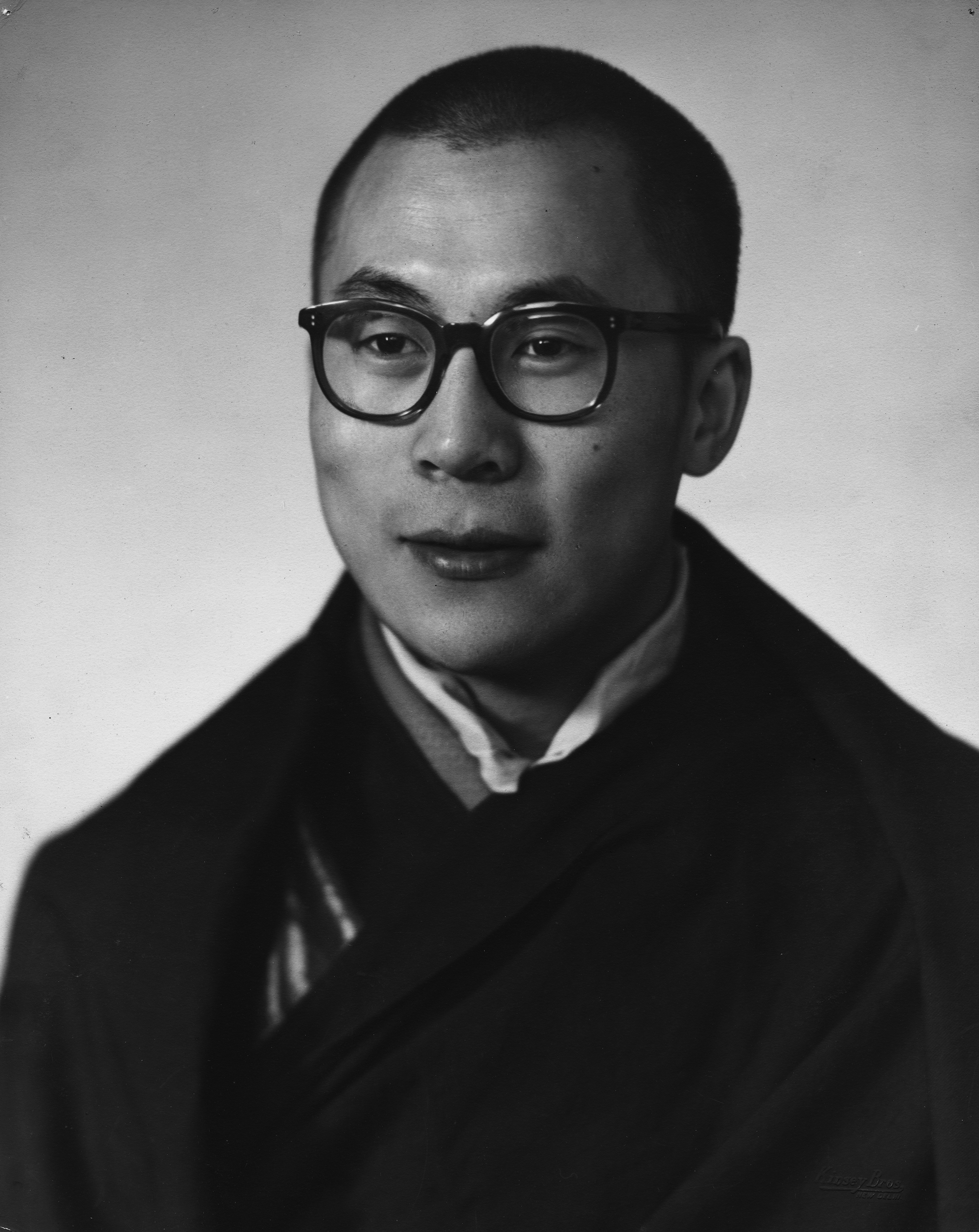
The 14th Dalai Lama in 1956

According to historian Tsering Shakya, the Chinese government was pressuring the Dalai Lama to attend the National People's Congress in April 1959, in order to repair China's image in relation to ethnic minorities after the Khampa rebellion. On 7 February 1959, a significant day on the Tibetan calendar, the Dalai Lama attended a religious dance, after which the acting representative in Tibet, Tan Guansan, offered the Dalai Lama a chance to see a performance from a dance troupe native to Lhasa at the Norbulingka to celebrate the Dalai Lama's completion of his lharampa geshe degree. According to the Dalai Lama's memoirs, the invitation came from Chinese General Zhang Jingwu, who proposed that the performance be held at the Chinese military headquarters; the Dalai Lama claimed that he had agreed. However, Tibetologist Sam van Schaik stated that the Dalai Lama was the one who proposed that the dance should take place in the military headquarters as the Norbulingka was too small. Both parties did not yet agree on a date, and the Dalai Lama seemed to put the event "out of his mind", focusing instead on his ongoing examinations for his Geshe degree as well as the Monlam Prayer Festival.

Besides Tan and the Dalai Lama, nobody was seemingly informed of the plans for the dance. As a result, the date for the planned performance was only finalized 5 or 3 days beforehand when Tan reminded the Dalai Lama of the dance; the latter then suggested 10 March. The decision was seemingly concluded on a whim. Neither the Kashag nor the Dalai Lama's bodyguards were informed of the Dalai Lama's plans until Chinese officials briefed them on 9 March, one day before the performance was scheduled, and insisted that they would handle the Dalai Lama's security. The Dalai Lama's memoirs state that on 9 March the Chinese told his chief bodyguard that they wanted the Dalai Lama's excursion to watch the production conducted "in absolute secrecy" and without any armed Tibetan bodyguards, which "all seemed strange requests and there was much discussion" amongst the Dalai Lama's advisors. Some members of the Kashag were alarmed and concerned that the Dalai Lama might be abducted, recalling a prophecy that told that the Dalai Lama should not exit his palace.

Tibet is independent! Chinese leave Tibet!

— Slogans used by protesters during the early uprising

According to historian Tsering Shakya, some Tibetan government officials feared that plans were being laid for a Chinese abduction of the Dalai Lama, and spread word to that effect amongst the inhabitants of Lhasa. On 10 March, several thousand Tibetans surrounded the Dalai Lama's palace to prevent him from leaving or being removed. The huge crowd had gathered in response to a rumor that the Chinese were planning to arrest the Dalai Lama when he went to a cultural performance at the PLA's headquarters. This marked the beginning of the uprising in Lhasa, though Chinese forces had skirmished with guerrillas outside the city in December of the previous year. The protesters publicly pleaded that the Dalai Lama should not attend the meeting with the Chinese officials, claiming that he would be kidnapped. Although CCP officials insisted that the "reactionary upper stratum" in Lhasa was responsible for the rumor, there is no way to identify the precise source. The protests soon turned violent. At first, the violence was directed at Tibetan officials perceived not to have protected the Dalai Lama or to be pro-Chinese; attacks on Chinese started later. One of the first casualties of the mob was a senior lama, Pagbalha Soinam Gyamco, who worked with the PRC as a member of the Preparatory Committee of the Tibet Autonomous Region, who was killed and his body dragged by a horse in front of the crowd for 2 kilometres (1.2 mi). The protesters also began to use openly anti-Chinese slogans such as "The Chinese must go, leave Tibet to Tibetans".

As protests and violence spread, the Dalai Lama informed the protesters that he would stay at the palace, yet this was no longer enough for the growing crowd. Protesters began to demand Tibetan independence, and urged the Dalai Lama's government to publicly endorse their actions. Barricades went up on the streets of Lhasa, and Chinese government soldiers and Tibetan rebel forces began to fortify positions within and around Lhasa in preparation for conflict. A petition of support for the armed rebels outside the city was taken up, and an appeal for assistance was made to the Indian consul. Chinese and Tibetan troops continued moving into position over the next several days, with Chinese artillery pieces being deployed within range of the Dalai Lama's summer palace, the Norbulingka.

17 March 1959: Thousands of Tibetan women surround the Potala Palace, the main residence of the Dalai Lama, to protest against Chinese rule and repression in Lhasa, Tibet. Hours later, fighting broke out and the Dalai Lama was forced to flee to safety in India. Photograph: AP

On 12 March thousands of women gathered in front of the Potala Palace in Lhasa on the ground called Dri-bu-Yul-Khai Thang. The leader of this nonviolent demonstration was Pamo Kusang. This demonstration, now known as Women's Uprising Day, started the Tibetan women's movement for independence. On 14 March at the same location thousands of women assembled in a protest led by "Gurteng Kunsang, a member of the aristocratic Kundeling family and mother of six who was later arrested by the Chinese and executed by firing squad."

After consulting the state oracle and concluding that the situation had become too unstable, the Dalai Lama and his close confidants opted to flee Lhasa. On 15 March, preparations for the Dalai Lama's evacuation from the city were set in motion, with Tibetan troops being employed to secure an escape route from Lhasa. On 17 March, two artillery shells landed near the Dalai Lama's palace, triggering his flight into exile. The Dalai Lama secretly left the palace the following night and slipped out of Lhasa with his family and a small number of officials. The Chinese had not strongly guarded the Potala, as they did not believe it likely that the Dalai Lama would try to flee. After reaching Lhoka, the Dalai Lama linked up with Kham rebels who began protecting him and upon reaching Lhotse at the Indian border, he proclaimed the restoration of Tibet's independence.

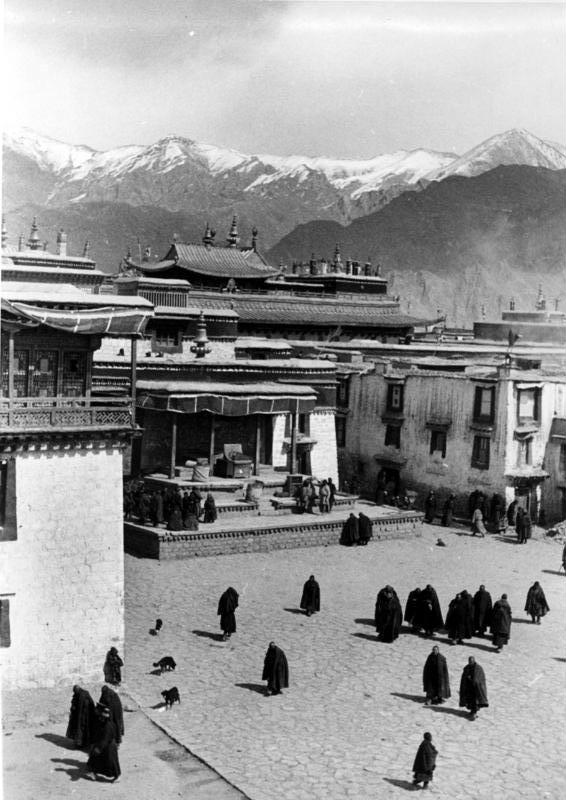
The Jokhang, on whose roof the last Tibetan rebels had placed machine guns to defend themselves against the PLA

Rumours about the Dalai Lama's disappearance began to spread rapidly on the next day, though most still believed that he was in the palace. Meanwhile, the situation in the city became increasingly tense, as protesters had seized a number of machine guns. At this point, remnants of the Tibetan Army had joined the protesters' ranks. On 20 March, the Chinese army responded by shelling the Norbulingka to disperse the crowd, and placed its troops at a barricade that divided the city into a northern and southern part in the following night. The battle began early on the following day and proved to be "bloody". Fighting in the streets continued for the next three days. The last Tibetan resistance was centered on the Jokhang, where Khampa refugees had set up machine guns, while a large number of Tibetans circumambulated the temple in reverence. The PLA started to attack the Jokhang on 23 March, and a hard-fought, three hours-long battle with many casualties on both sides ensued. The Chinese eventually managed to break through using a tank, whereupon they raised the flag of China on the temple, ending the uprising. Lhasa's streets were reportedly littered with corpses, and at least 4,000 people were arrested.

Two British writers, Stuart and Roma Gelder, visited the Chensel Phodrang palace in the Norbulingka in 1962 and "found its contents meticulously preserved".

The Indian government under Nehru expressed concerns of the Tibetan people and condemned China as an aggressive power due to the violent suppression of the revolt by the PLA.

== Involvement of the Republic of China ==
Pandatsang Rapga, a pro-Kuomintang and pro-Republic of China revolutionary Khampa leader, was instrumental in the revolt against the communists. The Kuomintang had a history of using Khampa fighters to oppose both the Dalai Lama's Tibetan government, and battle the Chinese Red Army. Rapga continued to cooperate with the ROC government after it fled to Taiwan.

The ROC government disagreed with the US government on whether Tibet should be independent, since the ROC claimed Tibet as part of its territory. Rapga agreed to a plan in which the revolt against the communists would include anti feudalism, land reform, a modern government, and to give power to the people.

Tibetans in Taiwan, who are mostly of Kham origin, support the Republic of China's position that Tibet is part of the ROC, and were against both the Tibetan exile community in India who live under the Tibetan Government-in-Exile (TGIE) and the communists in mainland China, with some regarding them as having compromised the Tibetan cause by recognizing the ROC's legal sovereignty. However, the Dalai Lama's first visit to Taiwan in 1997 was said to have somewhat improved the two communities' general relationship, although "tension" allegedly still exists between them due to considerable differences. The Dalai Lama's visit also allowed for Tibetans to visit Taiwan without directly contacting the Mongolian and Tibetan Affairs Commission, and some Tibetans in Taiwan (such as Changa Tsering, an incumbent MTAC committee member) subsequently attended the celebration of the Dalai Lama's visit in 1997.

The Tibetan community in Taiwan was also formerly divided between loyalty to the Dalai Lama and Taiwan's MTAC, although the MTAC was formally dissolved in 2017. The employees and responsibilities of the commission were thus officially reassigned to two places: the Mongolian and Tibetan Cultural Center under the Ministry of Culture, and the expanded Department of Hong Kong, Macao, Inner Mongolia, and Tibet Affairs under the Mainland Affairs Council.

== Casualties ==
Sinologist Colin Mackerras states: "There was a major rebellion against Chinese rule in Tibet in March 1959, which was put down with the cost of much bloodshed and lasting bitterness on the part of the Tibetans." The TGIE reports variously, 85,000, 86,000, and 87,000 deaths for Tibetans during the rebellion, attributed to "secret Chinese documents captured by guerrillas". Tibetologist Tom Grunfeld said "the veracity of such a claim is difficult to verify". Warren W. Smith, a writer with Radio Free Asia, writes that the "secret documents" came from a 1960 PLA report captured by guerrillas in 1966, with the figures first published by the TGIE in India in 1990. Smith states that the documents said that 87,000 "enemies were eliminated", but he does not take "eliminated" to mean "killed", as the TGIE does. CCP official Yan Hao could find no reference to any such figure in the published speech, and he concluded, "If these TGIE sources are not reluctant to fabricate Chinese sources in open publications, how can they expect people to believe in their citations of so-called Chinese secret internal documents and speeches that are never available in originals to independent researchers?"

The Peace Research Institute Oslo (PRIO) estimated 10,000 Tibetan and 2,000 PLA battle deaths. Lhasa had a population of sixty to seventy thousand at the time. Estimates covering 1956–59 including areas outside Lhasa put civilian deaths at around 60,000 and military deaths at around 40,000.

== Aftermath ==
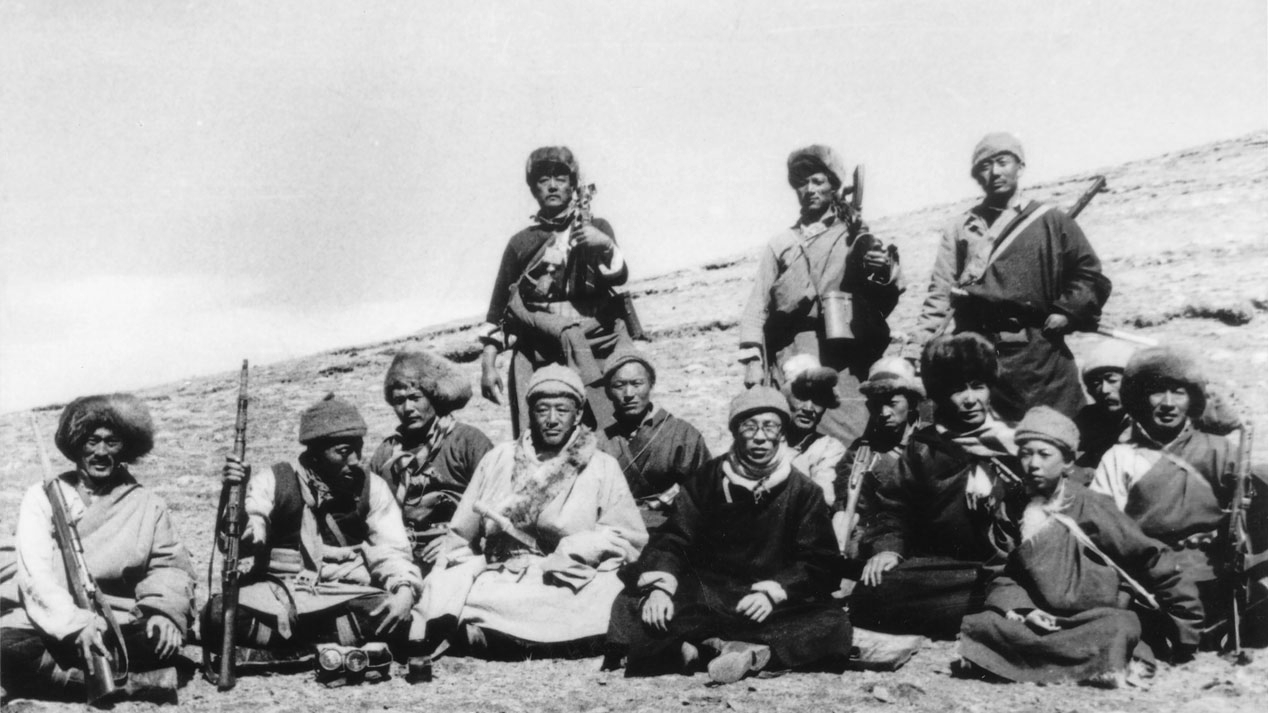
The Dalai Lama during his flight to exile across the Himalayas during the Tibetan uprising, March 1959

Following the uprising, the Chinese government launched a wide-reaching campaign to consolidate control and implement socialist reforms across Tibet. Lhasa's three major monasteries - Sera, Ganden, and Drepung were heavily damaged by shelling, with Sera and Drepung reportedly left nearly beyond repair. According to the TGIE, members of the Dalai Lama's bodyguard who were remaining in Lhasa were disarmed and publicly executed, along with Tibetans who were found to be harbouring weapons in their homes. Thousands of Tibetan monks were executed or arrested, and monasteries and temples around the city were looted or destroyed.

After the 12 March Women's Uprising demonstration, many of the women who were involved in it were imprisoned, including the leader of the demonstration, Pamo Kusang. "Some of them were tortured, died in prison, or were executed." Known as Women's Uprising Day, this demonstration started the Tibetan women's movement for independence.

Meanwhile, the CIA continued to support Tibetan resistance from 1957 to 1972, training agents in the United States and inserting them into Tibet to organize rebellions against the People's Liberation Army (PLA). CIA officer Bruce Walker, who oversaw the program, later expressed concern about the hostility that the radio teams encountered from the local population inside Tibet, with at least one group reportedly betrayed by his own brother, and all three agents were arrested. Despite the arrests, those agents were not mistreated and were later released across the Indian border after undergoing less than a month of propaganda sessions.

In April 1959, the 19-year-old Panchen Lama, the second ranking spiritual leader in Tibet, residing in Shigatse, called on Tibetans to support the Chinese government. However, after a tour through Tibet in May 1962, he wrote a document which is known as the 70,000 Character Petition. The document was addressed to Zhou Enlai and in it, he criticized Chinese abuses in Tibet. Shortly afterward, he met with Zhou in order to have a discussion about the document. The outlined petition dealt with the brutal suppression of the Tibetan people both during and after the PLA's invasion of Tibet and the sufferings of the people in The Great Leap Forward. In this document, he criticized the suppression that the Chinese authorities had conducted in retaliation for the 1959 Tibetan uprising. But in October 1962, the PRC authorities who were dealing with the population criticized the petition. Chairman Mao called the petition "... a poisoned arrow shot at the Party by reactionary feudal overlords." In 1967, the Panchen Lama was formally arrested and imprisoned until his release in 1977.

In June 1959, the Buddhist monk Palden Gyatso was arrested for demonstrating during the March uprising by Chinese officials. He spent the next 33 years in Chinese prisons and laogai or "reform through labor" camps, the longest term of any Tibetan political prisoner. He was tortured, including with a cattle prod that was activated in his mouth and which led to the loss of his teeth.

As part of the occupation of Tibet, in July 1959, the PLA occupied several Bhutanese enclaves in western Tibet which were under Bhutanese administration for more than 300 years, having been ceded to Bhutan by Ngawang Namgyal in the 17th century. These included Darchen, Labrang Monastery, Gartok and several smaller monasteries and villages near Mount Kailas.

Chinese authorities have interpreted the uprising as a revolt by the Tibetan elite against socialist reforms that were improving the lives of Tibetan serfs. Tibetan exile sources and some independent sources, on the other hand, have usually interpreted it as a popular uprising against Chinese rule. Historian Tsering Shakya has argued that the revolt reflected widespread dissatisfaction both with the Chinese authorities and also with the Tibetan government in Lhasa, which was seen as unable to protect the Dalai Lama's authority and Tibetan sovereignty.

The Dalai Lama, fearing for his safety, fled Lhasa on March 17, 1959, and eventually found refuge in India. Upon reaching India, he and his followers were granted asylum by the Indian government, marking the beginning of his exile. From his residence in Dharamshala, Himachal Pradesh, the Dalai Lama played a major role in promoting Tibetan Buddhism internationally and raising awareness of the Tibetan cause. According to Chope Paljor Tsering, a former minister in the Central Tibetan Administration, “Buddhism has not only survived, but been revived and appreciated... by many cultures around the world,” suggesting that the Dalai Lama has helped reshape global perceptions of Buddhism.

The 10 March anniversary of the uprising is observed by exiled Tibetans as Tibetan Uprising Day and Women's Uprising Day. On 19 January 2009, the PRC-controlled legislature in the Tibet Autonomous Region chose 28 March as the national anniversary of Serfs Emancipation Day. American Tibetologist Warren W. Smith Jr. describes the move as a "counter-propaganda" celebration following the 10 March 2008 unrest in Tibet.

== See also ==
- 1987–1989 Tibetan unrest
- 2008 Tibetan unrest
- 2010 Tibetan language protest
- Annexation of Tibet by the People's Republic of China
- Human rights in Tibet
- Protests and uprisings in Tibet since 1950
- Tibetan independence movement
- Tibetan sovereignty debate
- Tibetan Uprising Day and Women's Uprising Day Yearly Commemoration
- Xunhua Incident
