= Chamdo (region) =

Former region of China

Qamdo 昌都
- Region of China
- 1950–1965
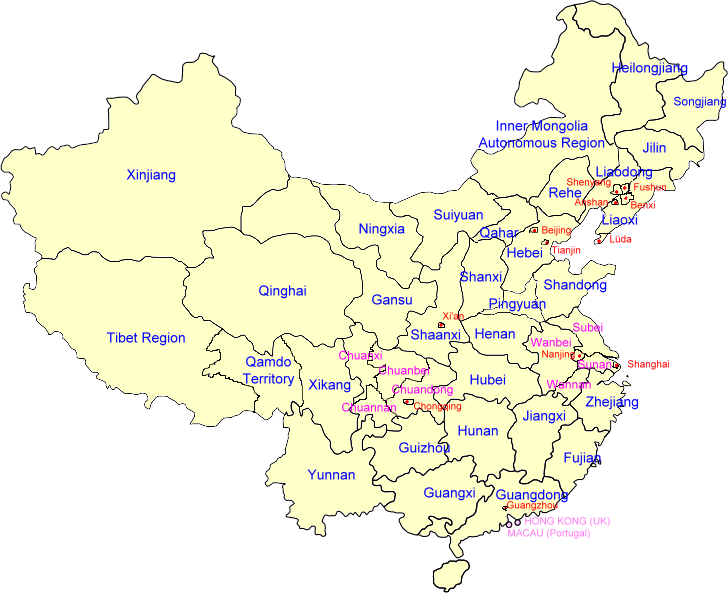
- Location of Qamdo in China
- Capital: Qamdo
- History
  - Established: 1950
  - Disestablished: 1965
- Today part of: China; Xizang

Chamdo or Qamdo (Chinese: 昌都; pinyin: Chāngdū; Wade–Giles: Chʻang¹-tu¹) was a former region in the western Kham region of Tibet, located in what is now part of Chinese Controlled Tibet. It existed from 1950 to 1965, and its capital was Qamdo.

Chamdo was established in 1950. It was split from Tibet after the Battle of Chamdo.

Chamdo was merged into Tibet in 1965.

== Administrative divisions ==
Division	Simplified Chinese	Hanyu Pinyin	County
directly-controlled			Qamdo, Riwoqê, Jomda, Lhorong, Xobando, Baxoi, Zhag'yab, Gonjo, Sangan, Zogang, Jiangka (Markam), Yanjing, Sang'angqu (Zayü)
First Regional Office	第一办事处	Dì-yī Bànshìchù	Lhari, Banbar, Sadêng, Biru, Sog, Baqên, Dêngqên, Chido, Sêrca
Second Regional Office	第二办事处	Dì-èr Bànshìchù	Yi'ong, Qundo, Qu
