= Fan Ming =

Chinese general

- 范明
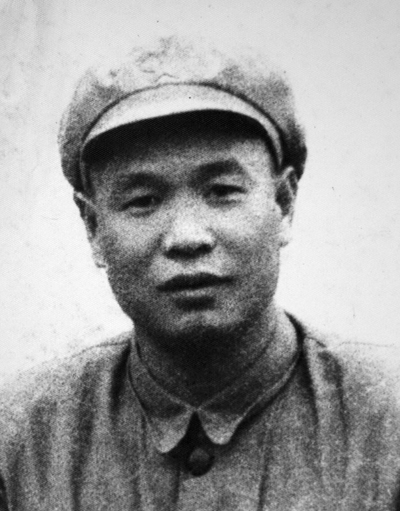
- Born: Hao Keyong (郝克勇); December 4, 1914; Lintong County, Shaanxi Province, Republic of China
- Died: February 23, 2010 (aged 95); Xi'an, Shaanxi Province, People's Republic of China
- Military career
- Allegiance: People's Republic of China
- Branch: People's Liberation Army
- Rank: Major General
- Conflicts: Second Sino-Japanese War; Chinese Civil War; Peaceful Liberation of Tibet

Fan Ming (Chinese: 范明; December 4, 1914 – February 23, 2010), originally named Hao Keyong (郝克勇), was a prominent political figure and military general in the People's Republic of China. Fan Ming died in Xi'an on February 23, 2010.

== Biography ==
=== Republic of China ===
Hao Keyong was born in 1914 in Hao Xing Village, Liyang Town, Lintong, Shaanxi Province, into a family with a blend of farming and scholarly traditions. His father, Hao Pengcheng (Chinese: 郝鹏程), served as a special forces battalion commander in Yang Hucheng's army. In 1929, Hao Keyong followed his brother, Hao Kejun, to Shanghai, where he enrolled at Jianguo Middle School. During the January 28 incident, both brothers joined the counter-Japanese resistance volunteers organized by the 19th National Army. In May of the same year, Hao Keyong joined the Communist Youth League of China. By 1935, he had enrolled in the National Government's Salt Tax Police Officers' and Cadets' School (Chinese: 国民政府盐务税警官佐学校). Upon graduation, he was assigned as a sub-captain in the salt tax police in Tianzhu County, Guizhou Province. However, due to his strong stance against smuggling, he faced resistance and eventually had to return to Xi'an.

After the Marco Polo Bridge incident, Hao enrolled in the Department of Political Science and Economics at the Xi'an Branch of the National Northeastern University. During his studies, he organized the anti-Japanese "Summer Art Society" (Chinese: 夏艺学会) and served as its president. He later attended the Anwu Youth Training Course, completing it in February 1938. Following this, Hao was introduced to the 17th Division of the 38th Army of the National Revolutionary Army (under Zhao Shoushan) in Sanyuan, where he served as a political instructor. In March, he was introduced to the Chinese Communist Party by Li Muyu (Chinese: 李慕愚) and Li Sen (Liang Lixiang, Chinese: 梁励生) and formally joined in June. Shortly after, Hao was assigned to the frontlines in Honghe Town, Yangcheng, Shanxi, serving as a political instructor for the instructional unit. The CCP designated him as responsible for organizational work within the instructional unit and other units directly under military command, also making him a member of the Work Committee of the 38th Army.

During the Second Sino-Japanese War, Hao Keyong engaged in united front work under the direct leadership of the CCP Shaanxi Provincial Committee, particularly under Zhou Enlai. Hao Keyong utilized platforms like Xinhua Daily, Ta Kung Pao, and the news and editorials from Xinhua News Agency to conduct publicity activities within the military. In September 1942, the 38th Army Work Committee dispatched a defense team to escort Hao Keyong to Lintong in Shaanxi Province. From there, he was guided to Yan'an through an underground transportation network organized by the CCP Shaanxi Provincial Committee. Hao first gave an initial report to Li Weihan and Jia Tuofu (Chinese: 贾拓夫) of the Northwest Bureau. Subsequently, Mao Zedong listened to his report several times. In mid-December 1942, Mao Zedong met with Hao twice more. During one of the meetings, Mao Zedong inquired about Hao Keyong's uncle's family name. Upon learning it was Fan, Mao suggested that, for the sake of maintaining secrecy, Hao should henceforth be known as Fan Ming. From that point on, Hao Keyong adopted the name Fan Ming and continued his work underground.

In the spring of 1943, Fan Ming returned to the 38th Army from Yan'an, relaying instructions from the Central Committee and Chairman Mao Zedong to the Work Committee and General Zhao Shoushan. Following the guidance from the Central Committee, Zhao Shoushan assigned Meng Dingjun to the Nationalist Army University, with Fan Ming serving as secretary of the Work Committee. By this time, the 38th Army had essentially become an anti-Japanese force under the leadership of the CCP.

In 1944, under Mao Zedong's directive, Fan Ming handed over party work and organizational responsibilities within the 38th Army to Li Sen and others, then returned to Yan'an in March. Between February 1938 and April 1944, Fan Ming and his colleagues organized five training programs, preparing over 2,000 revolutionary cadres and recruiting more than 500 CCP members. In June 1945, Fan Ming attended the Party School, and in September, Zhang Desheng, Secretary-General of the Northwest Bureau and head of the United Front Work Department, transferred him to the Northwest Bureau's United Front Work Department as a director through the Organization Department of the CCP Central Committee. Fan Ming was tasked with overseeing the deployment of CCP underground organizations across the five northwestern provinces, as well as in Kuomintang-controlled areas in Henan and northern Sichuan. He also participated in leading the Hengshan Uprising (Chinese: 横山起义) and served as director of the political department of the 6th Cavalry Division.

In 1949, Fan Ming was appointed secretary-general of the Political Department of the First Field Army of the Chinese People's Liberation Army and head of the Liaison Department. He served as an assistant to Peng Dehuai and participated in the defense of Yan'an, as well as in key battles including those at Qinghuabian, Yangmahe, Panglong, Shajiadian, Yichuan, Libei, Fumi, Lanzhou, and others.

=== People's Republic of China ===
On the eve of the founding of the People's Republic of China, Fan Ming traveled to Xining to gain the support of the 10th Panchen Lama for the new government. On August 25, 1950, he assisted the Panchen Lama in returning to Kumbum Monastery. Shortly after, Fan Ming was appointed as the secretary of the Tibet Work Committee under the CCP Northwest Bureau, commander and political commissar of the Tibet troops in the Northwest Military Region, and representative of the Northwest Military and Political Committee to the Panchen Regiment. In April 1951, Fan accompanied the 10th Panchen Lama to Beijing, where the Seventeen Point Agreement was signed in May. On August 28, 1951, Fan led 4,000 troops (later renamed the 18th Army on the journey) toward Tibet, accompanied by 8,000 yaks, horses, and over 1,000 camels. They arrived in Lhasa on December 1, 1951.

In 1952, following the establishment of the Tibet Military Region, Fan Ming became the deputy secretary of the CCP Tibet Regional Working Committee and the deputy political commissar of the Tibet Military Region. In 1955, at the age of 41, Fan Ming was conferred the rank of Major General.

In April 1958, Fan Ming was labeled a "rightist" and was immediately dismissed from all Party, government, and military positions. He was subsequently expelled from the CCP and the military. In September 1962, he was imprisoned in Qincheng Prison for alleged involvement in the Peng Dehuai Anti-Party Group.

In 1980, the Organization Department of the Chinese Communist Party conducted a review of his case, leading to his rehabilitation. Afterward, Fan Ming served as a member of the sixth and seventh sessions of the National Committee of the Chinese People's Political Consultative Conference (CPPCC). From December 1980 to May 1988, he held positions as the fourth and fifth vice-chairman of the Shaanxi Provincial Committee of the CPPCC.

In July 2001, at the age of 87, Fan Ming was invited to Lhasa to participate in commemorative events, including the "Ceremony to Celebrate the 50th Anniversary of the Peaceful Liberation of Tibet," where he was received by Hu Jintao, who was then a member of the Politburo Standing Committee of the Chinese Communist Party, Vice President of China, and Vice Chairman of the Central Military Commission. Fan Ming died at the age of 95 on February 23, 2010. On the morning of February 27, 2010, his body was cremated at Xi'an Sanzhao Cemetery. Hu Jintao, Wen Jiabao, Xi Jinping, Li Keqiang, and Zhu Rongji sent wreaths of condolences in his honor.
