= Battle of Chamdo =

Battle between Chinese and Tibetan forces

- Part of the Annexation of Tibet by the People's Republic of China and the Cold War
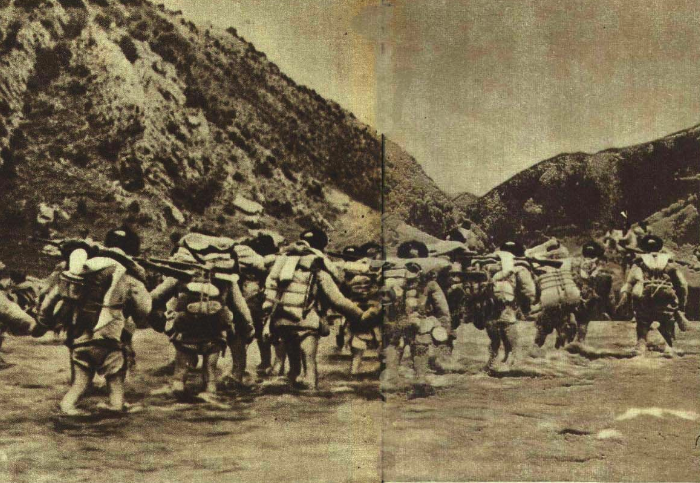
- PLA troops crossing the Jinsha River prior to the battle.
Date	6–24 October 1950
Location	Chamdo, Tibet (now Tibet Autonomous Region, China) 31.1372°N 97.1775°E
Result	Chinese victory
Territorial changes	Annexation of Tibet by the People's Republic of China

Belligerents
Tibet	China

Commanders and leaders
Ngapoi Ngawang Jigme (POW); Lhalu Tsewang Dorje	Liu Bocheng; Deng Xiaoping; Zhang Guohua; Fan Ming

Strength
Tibetan Army: 8,500	People's Liberation Army: 23,000

Casualties and losses
180 killed or wounded ~3,000 captured 3,341 killed, wounded, surrendered, captured, or defected (Chinese estimate)	114 killed or wounded

The Battle of Chamdo (or Qamdo; Chinese: 昌都战役) occurred from 6 to 24 October 1950. It was a military campaign by the People's Republic of China (PRC) to capture the Chamdo region from a de facto independent Tibetan state. The PRC's victory was followed by its annexation of Tibet.

== Background ==
The Khampa Tibetans and Lhasa Tibetans held each other in mutual contempt and dislike, with the Khampas in some cases hating Lhasa rule even more than Chinese rule, which was why the Khampas did little to resist Chinese forces as they entered eastern Kham and subsequently took over the whole of Tibet. Likewise, the Qinghai (Amdo) Tibetans view the Tibetans of Central Tibet (Tibet proper, ruled by the Dalai Lamas from Lhasa) as different from themselves and even take pride in the fact that they were not ruled by Lhasa ever since the collapse of the Tibetan Empire.

Khampas like the Pandatsang clan had led rebellions for autonomy from Lhasa. Because of this, the Chinese communists viewed them as potential revolutionary allies. In January 1950, the communists officially proposed to aid the Pandatsang brothers' cause in exchange for them to stay on the sidelines during the "liberation of Tibet", but the Pandatsang brothers decided instead to send George Patterson to India to seek alternate aid.

== PLA enters eastern Kham ==
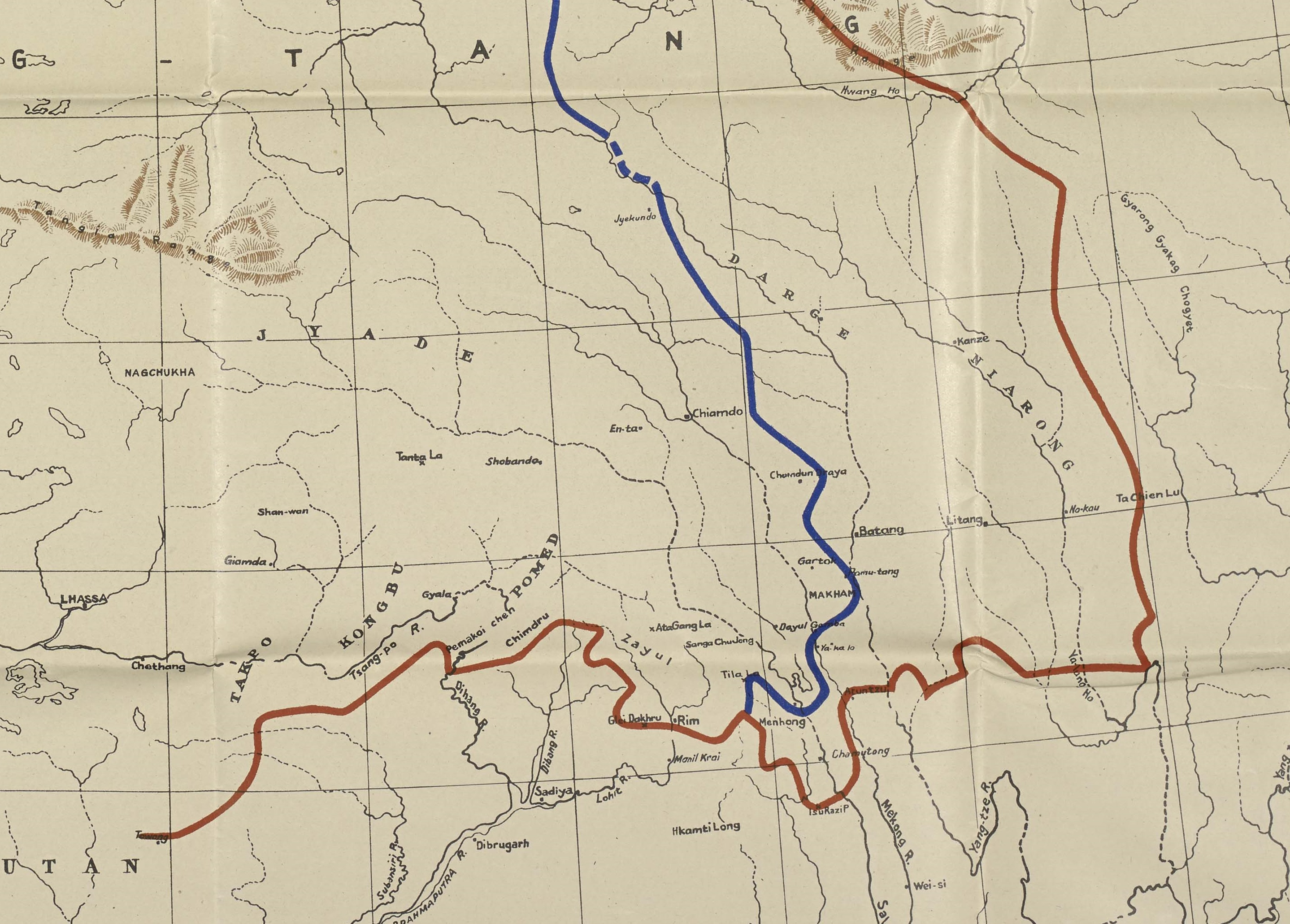
Western Kham and eastern Kham separated by a blue line in the Simla Convention map

After the defeat of major Kuomintang forces in the Chinese Civil War, the People's Liberation Army (PLA) of the Chinese Communist Party (CCP) turned its attention to the Republic of China territories in the hinterland. Eastern Kham was the Chinese-held part of Sikang and the gateway to Tibetan areas. The 18th Army of the PLA formed the leading detachment advancing toward Tibet with the 52nd Division as its main force, and arrived at Ya'an on 12 February 1950. In March, the People's Liberation Army arrived in Kangding (Tachienlu). By mid-April, the 18th Army had at least 30,000 passing through Kangding, and 10,000 Tibetans helped to build the road from Kangding to Garzê (Kandze), which was completed in August. The 18th Army of the PLA assembled at Garzê on 30 July, headquartered at Xinlong, and entered Litang from the east. The Qinghai Cavalry Detachment entered Gyêgu on 22 July, forming a north–south pincer on Chamdo.

=== Battle over Dengke ===
In June 1950, the PLA and the Tibetan army fought for the first time in Dengke (also known as Dengo). Dengke is located beside the main road from Garzê to Yushu, about 100 miles northeast of Chamdo. Former Chamdo governor Lhalu Tsewang Dorje had set up a radio station there. 50 PLA soldiers captured Dengke and destroyed the radio station. Two weeks later (July), 800 Khampa militia (including 300 monks) raided Dengke, claiming to have killed 600 PLA soldiers. In the end, the PLA succeeded in occupying eastern Kham.

=== Invasion and capture of Chamdo ===
After months of failed negotiations, attempts by Lhasa to secure foreign support and assistance, and the troop buildups by the PRC and Tibet, the PLA crossed the Jinsha River on 6 or 7 October 1950 into Lhasa-controlled Chamdo, crossing the de facto border at five places.

Two PLA units quickly captured the border town of Chamdo by 19 October, by which time 114 PLA soldiers and 180 Tibetan soldiers had been killed or wounded. The Chamdo governor and commander of Tibetan forces, Ngabo Ngawang Jigme, surrendered with his 2,700 men. Writing in 1962, Zhang Guohua claimed that 5,738 enemy troops were "liquidated", over 5,700 were "destroyed", and "more than 3,000" peacefully surrendered. Active hostilities were limited to a border area controlled by Lhasa northeast of the river Gyalmo Ngulchu River (upper reaches of Salween River in Tibet) and east of the 96th meridian.

The Peace Research Institute Oslo (PRIO) estimated that 2,000 PLA and 2,000 Tibetans were killed including noncombatants.

After confiscating their weapons, the PLA soldiers gave the prisoners lectures on socialism and a small amount of money, before allowing them to return to their homes. According to the Dalai Lama, the PLA did not attack civilians.

With the capture of Chamdo, the PLA believed the objective to have been reached, unilaterally ceased hostilities, and sent Ngabo to Lhasa to reiterate terms of negotiation, and waited for Tibetan representatives to respond through delegates to Beijing.

On 21 October, Lhasa instructed its delegation to leave immediately for Beijing for consultations with the PRC government, and to accept the first provision if the status of the Dalai Lama could be guaranteed, while rejecting the other two conditions. It later rescinded even acceptance of the first demand, after a divination before the Six-Armed Mahākāla deities indicated that the three points could not be accepted, since Tibet would fall under foreign domination.

On 24 October, all military operations ended.

== Aftermath ==
After releasing the captured soldiers, Chinese Communist Party broadcasts promised that if Tibet was "peacefully liberated", the Tibetan elites would not be denied their positions and power.

Some Khampa fighters continued their opposition. Local warlords later became united under a common objective and hence resulted in the formation of Chushi Gangdruk with assistance from the CIA.

According to contemporary author Melvyn Goldstein, the campaign aimed to capture the Lhasa army occupying Chamdo, demoralize the Lhasa government, and to exert pressure to get Tibetan representatives to agree to negotiations in Beijing and sign terms recognizing China's sovereignty over Tibet.

== See also ==
- British expedition to Tibet (1903–1904)
- Chinese expedition to Tibet (1910) – Military expedition into Tibet by the Qing dynasty
- Qinghai–Tibet War (1932)
- Sino-Tibetan War (1930–1932)
