= 1951 Chinese annexation of Tibet =

1950–1951 annexation in Asia

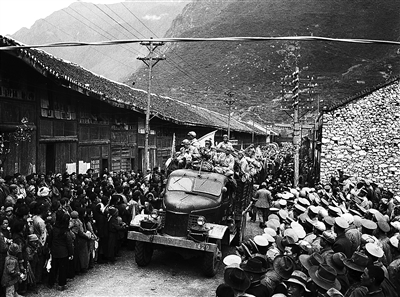
- PLA troops advancing through Kangding (Dartsedo)
Date	6 October 1950 – 24 October 1951
Location	Tibet
Result	Chinese victory
Territorial changes	Ü-Tsang and Chamdo of Kham come under Chinese control.

Belligerents
Tibet	China

Commanders and leaders
Ngawang Sungrab Thutob; Ngapoi Ngawang Jigme (POW); Lhalu Tsewang Dorje	Mao Zedong; Liu Bocheng; Zhang Guohua; Fan Ming

Units involved
Tibetan Army	People's Liberation Army

Casualties and losses
180 killed or wounded 894 captured 4,317 surrendered	2,000 killed 3,000 missing 2,000 frozen to death 3,000 dead of disease

Central Tibet (Note: As well as the western part of Kham corresponding to the Chamdo Region) was annexed by the People's Republic of China (PRC) after the government of Tibet signed the Seventeen Point Agreement which the 14th Dalai Lama ratified on 24 October 1951. The Chinese government calls the signing of the agreement the "Peaceful Liberation of Tibet". The events are called the "Chinese invasion of Tibet" by the exiled Central Tibetan Administration and much of the Tibetan diaspora.

Tibet has a complicated relationship with China. After the fall of the Qing dynasty, Ü-Tsang and surrounding areas began operating autonomously. The Republic of China (ROC) had inherited claims to the region but was not able to exert full control on the ground. Meanwhile, the Tibetan government failed to quickly modernize its military. Its negotiations with the PRC stalled, and the Tibetan Army was eventually defeated by the People's Liberation Army.

The Tibetan government and local social structure remained in place under the authority of China until they were dissolved after the 1959 Tibetan uprising, when the 14th Dalai Lama fled into exile and repudiated the Seventeen Point Agreement, saying that he had approved it under duress. Since 2005 he has advocated for greater autonomy for Tibet as part of China.

== Background ==
=== Qing dynasty ===
Tibet came under the rule of the Qing dynasty of China in 1720 after the Qing expelled the forces of the Dzungar Khanate from Tibet. Emperor Kangxi then wrote an edict for the Imperial Stele Inscriptions of the Pacification of Tibet. His successor Emperor Yongzheng went on to establish new boundaries between what are now the Tibet Autonomous Region (TAR), Qinghai, Sichuan and Yunnan.

=== Republic of China and de facto independence ===
Central Tibet remained under Qing suzerainty until the 1911 revolution. The succeeding Republic of China claimed inheritance of all Qing territories, including Tibet, described in the Imperial Edict of the Abdication of the Qing Emperor as an integral republic comprising different ethnic groups. This is also reflected in the Provisional Constitution of the Republic of China adopted in 1912.

By 1917 the area comprising the present-day TAR eventually became a de facto independent polity. Some border areas with high ethnic Tibetan populations (Amdo and Eastern Kham) remained under the Nationalist government or local warlord control.

The TAR region is also known as "Political Tibet", while all areas with a high ethnic Tibetan population are collectively known as "Ethnic Tibet". Political Tibet refers to the polity ruled continuously by Tibetan governments since earliest times until 1951, whereas ethnic Tibet refers to regions north and east where Tibetans historically predominated but where, down to modern times, Tibetan jurisdiction was irregular and limited to just certain areas.

At the time Political Tibet obtained de facto independence, its socio-economic and political systems resembled Medieval Europe. Attempts by the 13th Dalai Lama between 1913 and 1933 to enlarge and modernize the Tibetan military had eventually failed, largely due to opposition from powerful aristocrats and monks. On 12 August 1927, the Republic of China mandated that before the publication of new laws, all laws in history regarding Tibetan Buddhism should continue unless there were conflicts with new doctrine or new laws of the Central Government. The Tibetan government had little contact with other governments of the world during its period of de facto independence, with some exceptions; notably India, the United Kingdom, and the United States. This left Tibet diplomatically isolated and cut off to the point where it could not make its positions on issues well known to the international community.

The ROC's 1931 provisional constitution stated, "The territory of the Republic of China includes all the provinces, Mongolia, and Tibet."

=== People's Republic of China ===
In July 1949, in order to prevent Chinese Communist Party-sponsored agitation from spreading to Central Tibet, the Tibetan government expelled the Nationalist delegation in Lhasa. The (Nationalist) Chinese approved a request to exempt Lhamo Dhondup from lot-drawing process using Golden Urn to become the 14th Dalai Lama on 31 January 1940. In November 1949, Tibetan government sent a letter to the US State Department and a copy to Mao Zedong, and a separate letter to the British government, declaring its intent to defend itself "by all possible means" against PRC troop incursions into Tibet.

In the preceding three decades, the conservative Tibetan government had consciously de-emphasized its military and refrained from modernizing. Hasty attempts at modernization and enlarging the military began in 1949, but proved mostly unsuccessful on both counts. By then, it was too late to raise and train an effective army. India provided some small arms aid and military training. However, the People's Liberation Army (PLA) was much larger, better led, trained, equipped and more experienced than the Tibetan Army.

In 1950, the 14th Dalai Lama was 15 years old and had not attained his majority, so Regent Taktra was the acting head of the Tibetan Government. The period of the Dalai Lama's minority is traditionally one of instability and division, exacerbated by the recent Reting conspiracy and a 1947 regency dispute.

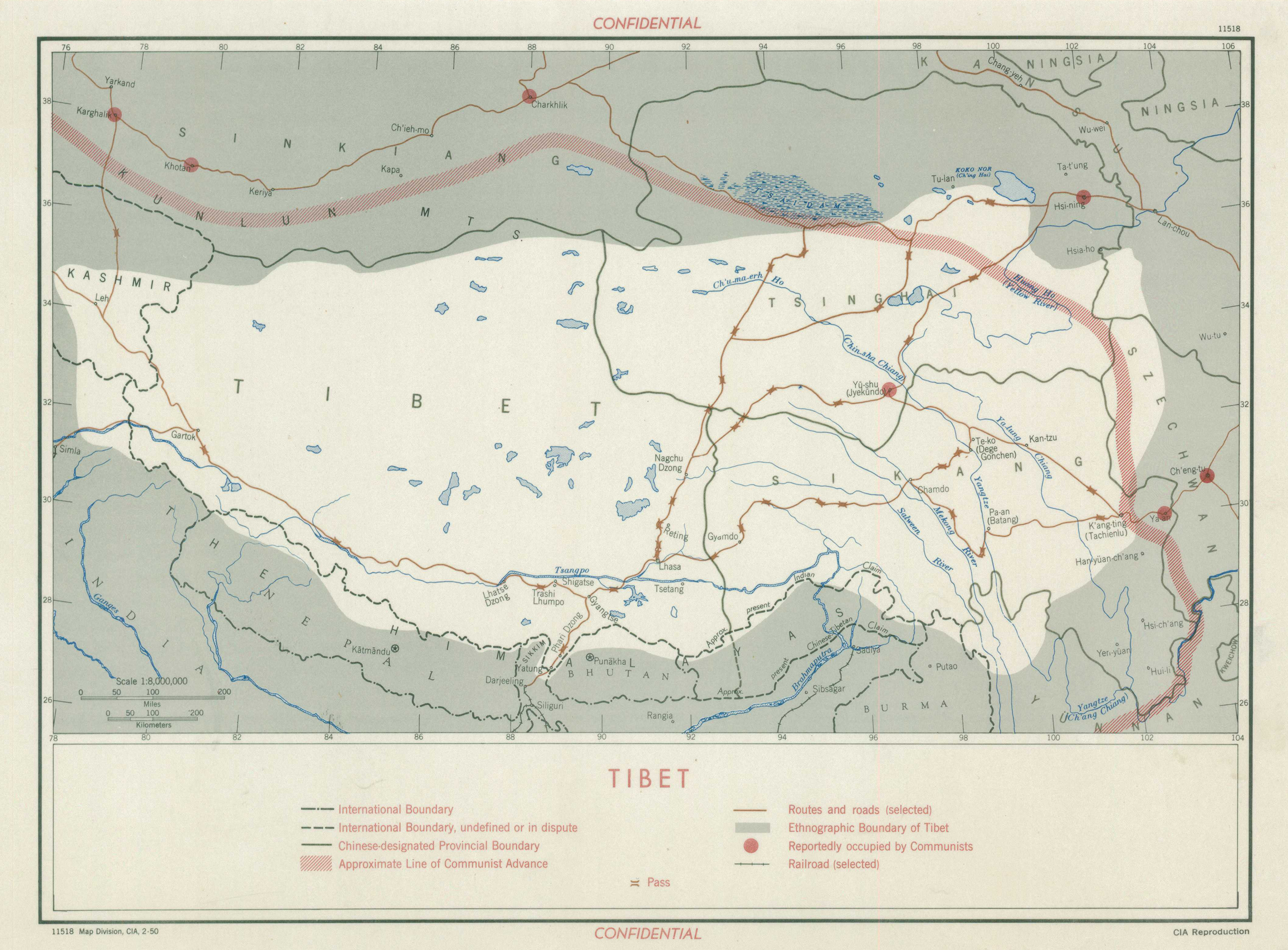
Approximate Line of Communist Advance (CIA, February 1950)

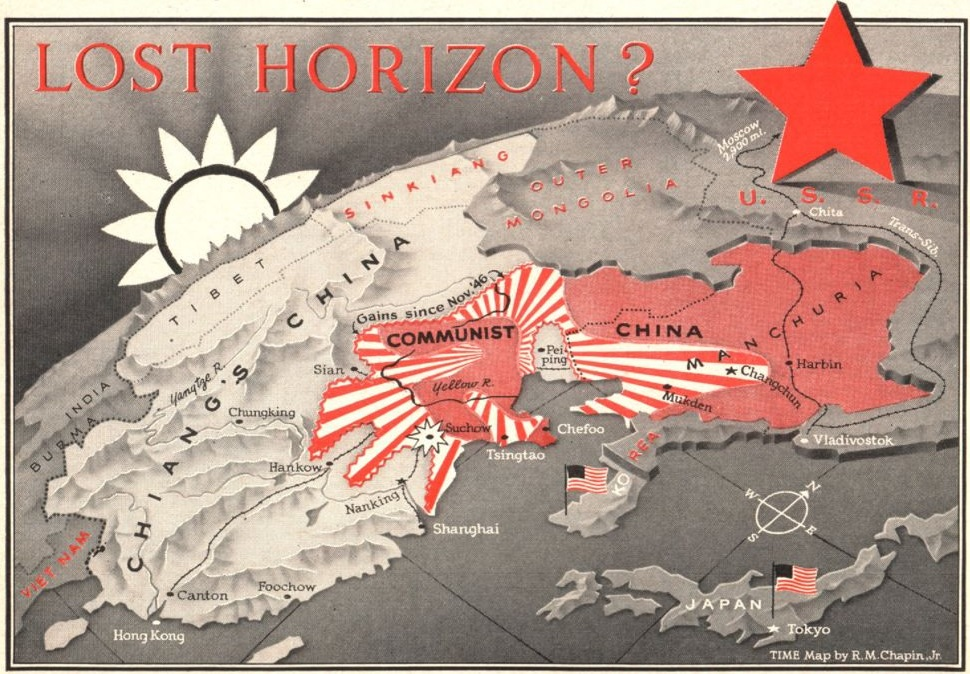
Map of the Far East from the Time magazine showing the situation of the Chinese Civil War in late 1948. Tibet is listed as part of China, while Outer Mongolia is listed outside of China since it was recognized as an independent country by that time, unlike Tibet.

Both the PRC and their rival predecessors the Kuomintang (ROC) had always maintained that Tibet was a part of China. The PRC also proclaimed an ideological motivation to "liberate" the Tibetans from a theocratic feudal system. In September 1949, shortly before the proclamation of the People's Republic of China, the Chinese Communist Party (CCP) made it a top priority to incorporate Tibet, Taiwan Island, Hainan Island, and the Penghu Islands into the PRC, peacefully or by force. China viewed incorporating Tibet as important to consolidate its frontiers and address national defense concerns in the southwest. Because Tibet was unlikely to voluntarily give up its de facto independence, Mao in December 1949 ordered that preparations be made to march into Tibet at Qamdo (Chamdo), in order to induce the Tibetan Government to negotiate. The PRC had over a million men under arms and had extensive combat experience from the recently concluded Chinese Civil War.

== Negotiations between Tibet and the PRC ==
Talks between Tibet and China were mediated by the governments of Britain and India. On 7 March 1950, a Tibetan delegation arrived in Kalimpong, India, to open a dialogue with the newly declared People's Republic of China and to secure assurances that the Chinese would respect Tibetan territorial integrity, among other things. The onset of talks was delayed by debate between the Tibetan, Indian, British, and Chinese delegations about the location of the talks. Tibet favored Singapore or Hong Kong (not Beijing; at the time romanized as Peking); Britain favored India (not Hong Kong or Singapore); and India and the Chinese favored Beijing. The Tibetan delegation did eventually meet with the PRC's ambassador General Yuan Zhongxian in Delhi on 16 September 1950. Yuan communicated a 3-point proposal that Tibet be regarded as part of China, that China be responsible for Tibet's defense, and that China be responsible for Tibet's trade and foreign relations. Acceptance would lead to peaceful Chinese sovereignty, or otherwise war. The Tibetans undertook to maintain the relationship between China and Tibet as one of priest-patron:

"Tibet will remain independent as it is at present, and we will continue to have very close 'priest-patron' relations with China. Also, there is no need to liberate Tibet from imperialism, since there are no British, American or Guomindang imperialists in Tibet, and Tibet is ruled and protected by the Dalai Lama (not any foreign power)."

— Tsepon W. D. Shakabpa

They and their head delegate Tsepon W. D. Shakabpa, on 19 September, recommended cooperation, with some stipulations about implementation. Chinese troops need not be stationed in Tibet. It was argued that Tibet was under no threat, and if attacked by India or Nepal, could appeal to China for military assistance. While Lhasa deliberated, on 7 October 1950, Chinese troops advanced into eastern Tibet, crossing the border at five places. The purpose was not to invade Tibet per se but to capture the Tibetan army in Chamdo, demoralize the Lhasa government, and thus exert powerful pressure to send negotiators to Beijing to sign terms for a handover of Tibet. On 21 October, Lhasa instructed its delegation to leave immediately for Beijing for consultations with the Communist government, and to accept the first provision, if the status of the Dalai Lama could be guaranteed, while rejecting the other two conditions. It later rescinded even acceptance of the first demand, after a divination before the Six-Armed Mahākāla deities indicated that the three points could not be accepted, since Tibet would fall under foreign domination.

== Battle of Chamdo ==
After months of failed negotiations, attempts by Tibet to secure foreign support and assistance, PRC and Tibetan troop buildups, the People's Liberation Army (PLA) crossed the Jinsha River on 6 or 7 October 1950. Two PLA units quickly surrounded the outnumbered Tibetan forces and captured the border town of Chamdo by 19 October, by which time 114 PLA soldiers and 180 Tibetan soldiers had been killed or wounded. Writing in 1962, Zhang Guohua claimed "over 5,700 enemy men were destroyed" and "more than 3,000" peacefully surrendered. The Peace Research Institute Oslo (PRIO) estimated that 2,000 PLA and 2,000 Tibetans were killed including noncombatants. Active hostilities were limited to a border area northeast of the Gyamo Ngul Chu River and east of the 96th meridian. After capturing Chamdo, the PLA broke off hostilities, sent a captured commander, Ngabo, to Lhasa to reiterate terms of negotiation, and waited for Tibetan representatives to respond through delegates to Beijing.

== Further negotiations and annexation ==
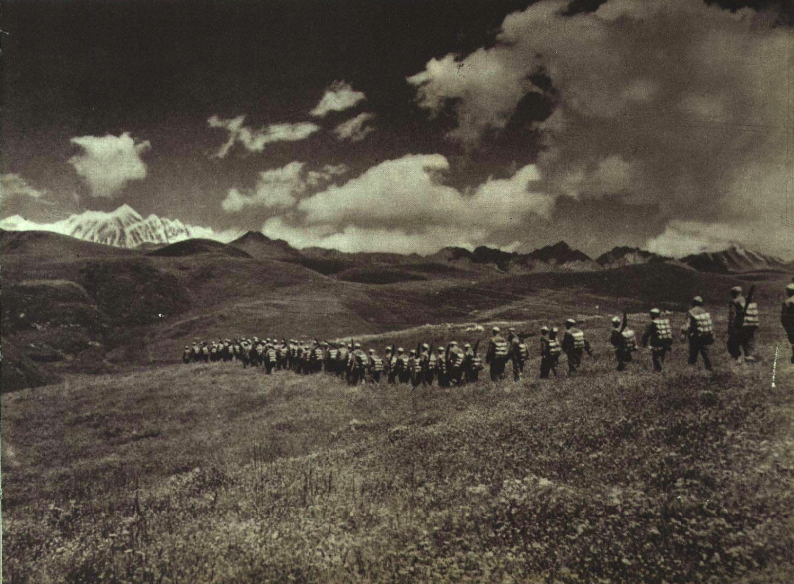
PLA soldiers marching toward Tibet in 1950

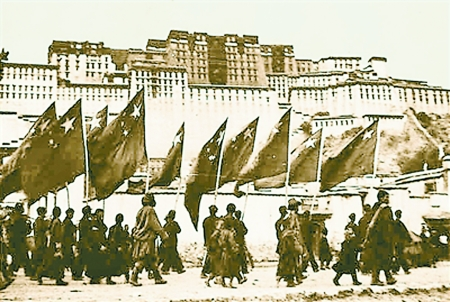
PLA marching into Lhasa in October 1951

The PLA sent released prisoners (among them the governor-general of Kham, Ngapoi Ngawang Jigme), to Lhasa to negotiate with the Dalai Lama on the PLA's behalf. Chinese broadcasts promised that if Tibet was "peacefully liberated", the Tibetan elites could keep their positions and power.

One month after China invaded Tibet, El Salvador sponsored a complaint by the Tibetan government at the UN, but India and the United Kingdom prevented it from being debated.

Tibetan negotiators were sent to Beijing and presented with an already-finished document commonly referred to as the Seventeen Point Agreement. There was no negotiation offered by the Chinese delegation; although the PRC stated it would allow Tibet to reform at its own pace and in its own way, keep internal affairs self-governing and allow religious freedom; it would also have to agree to be part of China. The Tibetan negotiators were not allowed to communicate with their government on this key point, and pressured into signing the agreement on 23 May 1951, despite never having been given permission to sign anything in the name of the government. This was the first time in Tibetan history its government had accepted – albeit unwillingly – China's position on the two nations' shared history.

Tibetan representatives in Beijing and the PRC Government signed the Seventeen Point Agreement on 23 May 1951, authorizing the PLA presence and Central People's Government rule in Political Tibet. The terms of the agreement had not been cleared with the Tibetan Government before signing and the Tibetan Government was divided about whether it was better to accept the document as written or to flee into exile. The Dalai Lama, who by this time had ascended to the throne, chose not to flee into exile, and formally accepted the 17 Point Agreement in October 1951. According to Tibetan sources, on 24 October, on behalf of the Dalai Lama, general Zhang Jingwu sent a telegram to Mao Zedong with confirmation of the support of the Agreement, and there is evidence that Ngapoi Ngawang Jigme simply came to Zhang and said that the Tibetan Government agreed to send a telegram on 24 October, instead of the formal Dalai Lama's approval. Shortly afterwards, the PLA entered Lhasa. The subsequent annexation of Tibet is officially known in the People's Republic of China as the "Peaceful Liberation of Tibet" (Chinese: 和平解放西藏地方 Hépíng jiěfàng xīzàng dìfāng), as promoted by the state media.

== Aftermath ==
Chinese and Tibetan government officials at a banquet celebrating the 'peaceful liberation' of Tibet

For several years, the Tibetan Government remained in place in the areas of Tibet where it had ruled prior to the outbreak of hostilities, except for the area surrounding Qamdo that was occupied by the PLA in 1950, which was placed under the authority of the Qamdo Liberation Committee and outside the Tibetan Government's control. During this time, areas under the Tibetan Government maintained a large degree of autonomy from the Central Government and were generally allowed to maintain their traditional social structure, such as having hereditarily bound peasants. The 14th Dalai Lama was open to Tibetan feudal society being reformed under Chinese help, while Mao followed a gradualist policy and was willing to postpone reforms and reduce the number of CCP cadres in central Tibet. He was able to at least temporarily stop subordinates who supported the more progressive Panchen Lama and were eager to implement greater policy changes, but the Dalai Lama was unable to control the more hardline anti-Chinese Tibetans under him who were creating difficulties for coexistence or did want to lose their aristocratic privileges.

In 1956, the PRC government began land reforms in Sichuan, prompting many Kham Tibetan refugees and rebels, such as the Chushi Gangdruk, to flee to Lhasa. Some of them joined forces with the more nationalistic Tibetans there. Further tensions led to an uprising in March 1959, during which the Dalai Lama fled with an entourage of twenty, including six Cabinet ministers, to India.

Both the Dalai Lama and the PRC government in Tibet subsequently repudiated the 17 Point Agreement, and the PRC government in Tibet dissolved the Tibetan Local Government. The legacy of this action continues to the present day.

== See also ==
- 1959 Tibetan uprising
- History of Tibet
  - Tibet under Yuan rule
  - Tibet under Qing rule
  - Tibet (1912–1951)
  - History of Tibet (1950–present)
- Incorporation of Xinjiang into the People's Republic of China
- List of military occupations
- Monument to the Peaceful Liberation of Tibet
- Sino-Tibetan War (1930–1932)
- Tibetan sovereignty debate
