= Seventeen Point Agreement =

1951 agreement between the Chinese and Tibetan governments

Agreement of the Central People's Government and the Local Government of Tibet on Measures for the Peaceful Liberation of Tibet
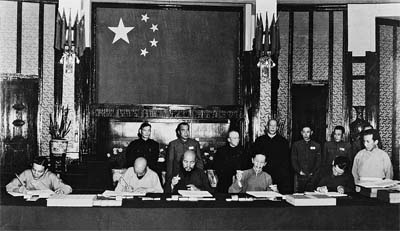
- Tibetan plenipotentiaries signing the agreement
- Signed: 23 May 1951
- Location: Qinzheng Hall, Zhongnanhai, Beijing, China
- Ratified: 24 October 1951
- Parties: Government of Tibet; Central People's Government of the People's Republic of China
- Ratifiers: 14th Dalai Lama
- Languages: Tibetan; Chinese

Full text
- The Agreement of the Central People's Government and the local government of Tibet on Measures for the Peaceful liberation of Tibet at Wikisource

Agreement of the Central People's Government and the Local Government of Tibet on Measures for the Peaceful Liberation of Tibet

Chinese name
- Traditional Chinese: 中央人民政府和西藏地方政府關於和平解放西藏辦法的協議
- Simplified Chinese: 中央人民政府和西藏地方政府关于和平解放西藏办法的协议
Transcriptions
Standard Mandarin
- Hanyu Pinyin: Zhōngyāng Rénmín Zhèngfǔ hé Xīzàng Dìfāng Zhèngfǔ guānyú hépíng jiěfàng Xīzàng bànfǎ de xiéyì
Yue: Cantonese
- Jyutping: Zung^{1}joeng^{1} Jan^{4}man^{4} Zing^{3}fu^{2} wo^{4} Sai^{1}zong^{6} Dei^{6}fong^{1} Zing^{3}fu^{2} gwaan^{1}jyu^{1} wo^{4}ping^{4} gaai^{2}fong^{3} Sai^{1}zong^{6} baan^{6}faat^{3} dik^{1} hip^{6}ji^{5}

Seventeen Point Agreement
- Traditional Chinese: 十七條協議
- Simplified Chinese: 十七条协议
Transcriptions
Standard Mandarin
- Hanyu Pinyin: shíqī tiáo xiéyì
Yue: Cantonese
- Jyutping: sap^{6}cat^{1} tiu^{4} hip^{6}ji^{5}

Tibetan name
- Tibetan: བོད་ཞི་བས་བཅིངས་འགྲོལ་འབྱུང་ཐབས་སྐོར་གྱི་གྲོས་མཐུན་དོན་ཚན་བཅུ་བདུན་
Transcriptions
- Wylie: bod zhi pas bcings 'grol 'byung thabs skor gyi gros mthun don tshan bcu bdun

The Seventeen-Point Agreement (Note: Chinese: 十七条协议; pinyin: Shíqī tiáo xiéyì; Standard Tibetan: མོག་མོགགྲོས་མཐུན་དོན་ཚན་བཅུ་བདུན, romanized: Gros mthun don tshan bcu bdun) (officially the Agreement of the Central People's Government and the Local Government of Tibet on Measures for the Peaceful Liberation of Tibet (Note: Chinese: 中央人民政府和西藏地方政府关于和平解放西藏办法的协议; pinyin: Zhōngyāng rénmín zhèngfǔ hé xīzàng dìfāng zhèngfǔ guānyú hépíng jiěfàng xīzàng bànfǎ de xiéyì; Standard Tibetan: མོག་མོགགྲོས་མཐུན་དོན་ཚན་བཅུ་བདུནབོད་ཞི་བས་བཅིངས་འགྲོལ་འབྱུང་ཐབས་སྐོར་གྱི་གྲོས་མཐུན་དོན་ཚན་བཅུ་བདུན་, romanized: bod zhi bas bcings 'grol 'byung thabs skor gyi gros mthun don tshan bcu bdun)) was an agreement between the Local Government of Tibet and the Central People's Government of the People's Republic of China to formalize the annexation of Tibet. It was signed by plenipotentiaries of the CPG and the Tibetan Government (Ganden Phodrang) on 23 May 1951, in Zhongnanhai, Beijing. The 14th Dalai Lama ratified the agreement in the form of a telegraph on 24 October 1951 even though the United States informed him that in order to receive assistance and support from the United States, he must depart from Tibet and publicly disavow "agreements concluded under duress". However, from the U.S. perspective, charges of Chinese Communist aggression would have little resonance if the Dalai Lama returned to Lhasa and ratified the agreement, so a major effort was made to persuade him to denounce the Seventeen-Point Agreement and flee into exile. The Dalai Lama stated that the Tibetan local government, ecclesiastic and secular folk, unanimously support the agreement, and will actively support the People's Liberation Army in Tibet in consolidating national defense, drive out imperialist influences from Tibet, and safeguard the unification of the territory and the sovereignty of the Motherland.

More than 7 years after the ratification of the agreement, after his arrival in India on 19 March 1959, the 14th Dalai Lama issued a statement that the agreement was made under pressure of the Chinese Government, and the Dalai Lama and his Government tried their best to adhere to the 17 Point Agreement. On 20 June 1959, he stated that the agreement was between two independent and sovereign States, and the consent of the government was secured under duress. Ngapoi Ngawang Jigme, who led the Tibetan delegation during the agreement's negotiations, claimed that there was no duress involved. The Central Tibetan Administration, which was formed after 1960, stated in 2021 that the agreement was not signed with the mutual consent of both parties, the agreement had no legal validity even though it was ratified by the 14th Dalai Lama.

== Background ==
After the fall of the Qing dynasty in 1912, the 13th Dalai Lama declared the independence of Tibet. This de facto independence was repeatedly challenged by the Chinese government in Beijing. On 1 October 1949, the 10th Panchen Lama wrote a telegraph to congratulate the Chinese communists on the liberation of the northwest and the establishment of People's Republic of China. He also expressed his excitement at the impending liberation of Tibet. The People's Liberation Army crossed the Jinsha River on 6 or 7 October 1950 and defeated the Tibetan army by 19 October at the Battle of Chamdo. Instead of continuing with the military campaign, China asked Tibet to send representatives to Beijing to negotiate an agreement. The Dalai Lama believes the draft agreement was written by China, and Tibetan representatives were not allowed to suggest any alterations. China did not allow the Tibetan representatives to communicate with the Tibetan government in Lhasa. The Tibetan delegation was not authorized by Lhasa to sign, but ultimately submitted to pressure from the Chinese to sign anyway, using seals which had been specifically made for the purpose. After the second negotiation, Ngapoi Ngawang Jigme telegraphed to and sought feedback from the Kashag insisting on the deployment of troops.

After Ngapo Ngawang Jigmei returned to Lhasa from Beijing, the Tibetan government convened an "official meeting" from 26 to 29 September, which included all monks and lay officials, abbots of the three major monasteries, and officers of the Tibetan army above the rank of Jiaben, totaling more than 300 people. The meeting approved the statement presented to the Dalai Lama: "The signed 17-point agreement will be of great benefit to the Dalai Lama's great cause, and to the Buddhist teachings, politics, and economy of Tibet. It is unparalleled, and should be followed and implemented." The 14th Dalai Lama ratified the agreement in the form of a telegraph on 24 October 1951.

== Agreement ==
=== Agreement text ===
Agreement between the Central People's Government and the Tibetan Local Government on Measures for the Peaceful Liberation of Tibet:

The Tibetan ethnic group is one of the ethnic groups with a long history in China. Like many other ethnic groups, it has fulfilled its glorious responsibilities in the creation and development of the great motherland. However, in the past hundred years, imperialist forces have invaded China, and therefore invaded the Tibetan region, and carried out various deceptions and provocations. The Kuomintang reactionary government, like the previous reactionary governments, continued to implement its policy of national oppression and national alienation towards the Tibetan ethnic group, resulting in division and disunity within the Tibetan ethnic group. The Tibetan local government did not oppose the imperialist deception and provocation, and adopted an unpatriotic attitude towards the great motherland. These circumstances have plunged the Tibetan ethnic group and the Tibetan people into the abyss of slavery and suffering.

In 1949, the Chinese People's Liberation War achieved a basic victory across the country, overthrew the common internal enemy of all ethnic groups - the Kuomintang reactionary government, and expelled the common external enemy of all ethnic groups - the imperialist aggression forces. On this basis, the People's Republic of China and the Central People's Government were declared established. In accordance with the common program adopted by the Chinese People's Political Consultative Conference, the Central People's Government declared that all ethnic groups within the territory of the People's Republic of China are equal, practice solidarity and mutual assistance, oppose imperialism and the people's public enemies within the ethnic groups, and make the People's Republic of China a big family of friendship and cooperation among all ethnic groups.

Within the big family of all ethnic groups in the People's Republic of China, ethnic regional autonomy is implemented in areas where ethnic minorities live in concentrated communities. All ethnic minorities have the freedom to develop their own languages and scripts, maintain or reform their customs and religious beliefs, and the Central People's Government helps all ethnic minorities develop their political, economic, cultural and educational construction. Since then, all ethnic groups in the country have been liberated, except for Tibet and Taiwan. Under the unified leadership of the Central People's Government and the direct leadership of the higher-level people's governments, all ethnic minorities have fully enjoyed the right to ethnic equality and have implemented or are implementing ethnic regional autonomy.

In order to successfully eliminate the influence of imperialist aggression in Tibet, complete the unification of the territory and sovereignty of the People's Republic of China, safeguard national defense, liberate the Tibetan ethnic group and the Tibetan people, return to the big family of the People's Republic of China, enjoy the same national equality rights as other ethnic groups in the country, and develop their political, economic, cultural and educational undertakings, the Central People's Government, when ordering the People's Liberation Army to march into Tibet, notified the Tibetan local government to send representatives to the Central Government for negotiations in order to conclude an agreement on the peaceful liberation of Tibet. In late April 1951, the plenipotentiary representatives of the Tibetan local government arrived in Beijing.

The Central People's Government immediately appointed plenipotentiary representatives and the plenipotentiary representatives of the Tibetan local government to hold negotiations on a friendly basis. As a result of the negotiations, both parties agreed to establish this agreement and guarantee its implementation.

1. The Tibetan people shall unite and drive out invading imperialist forces from Tibet; the Tibetan people shall return to the big family of the motherland – the People's Republic of China.
2. The local government of Tibet shall actively assist the People's Liberation Army in entering Tibet and consolidating national defense.
3. In accordance with the policy towards nationalities laid down in the Common Program of the Chinese People's Political Consultative Conference, the Tibetan people shall have the right to exercise national regional autonomy under the unified leadership of the Central People's Government.
4. The central authorities will not alter the existing political system in Tibet. The central authorities will also not alter the established status, functions and powers of the Dalai Lama. Officials of various ranks shall continue to hold office.
5. The established status, functions and powers of the Panchen Ngoerhtehni shall be maintained.
6. The established status, functions and powers of the Dalai Lama and of the Panchen Ngoerhtehni mean the status, functions, and powers of the 13th Dalai Lama and the 9th Panchen Ngoerhtehni when relations between them are friendly and amicable.
7. The policy of freedom of religious belief as laid down in the common program shall be carried out. The religious beliefs, customs and practices of the Tibetan people shall be respected, and lama monasteries shall be protected. The central authorities will not influence or change the income of the monasteries.
8. Tibetan soldiers shall be gradually integrated into the People's Liberation Army, and become a part of the defense force of the People's Republic of China.
9. The spoken and written language and education system of the Tibetan nationality shall be developed step by step in accordance with the actual conditions in Tibet.
10. Tibetan agriculture, livestock raising, industry, and commerce shall be developed step by step and the people's livelihood shall be improved step by step in accordance with the actual conditions in Tibet.
11. In matters related to various reforms in Tibet, there will be no compulsion on the part of the central authorities. The local government of Tibet shall carry out reforms of its own accord, and, when the people raise demands for reform, they shall be settled through consultation with the leading personnel of Tibet.
12. In so far as former pro-imperialist and pro-Kuomintang officials resolutely sever relations with imperialism and the Kuomintang and do not engage in sabotage or resistance, they may continue to hold office irrespective of their past.
13. The People's Liberation Army entering Tibet shall abide by all the aforementioned policies, and shall also be fair in all commerce, and shall not arbitrarily take a needle or thread from the people.
14. The Central People's Government shall have centralized handling of all of Tibet's external affairs; there will be peaceful coexistence with neighboring countries as well as the establishment and development of fair commercial and trading relations with them on the basis of equality, mutual benefit, and mutual respect for territory and sovereignty.
15. In order to ensure the implementation of this agreement, the Central People's Government shall set up a military and administrative committee and military area headquarters in Tibet and – apart from the personnel sent there by the Central People's Government – shall absorb as many local Tibetan personnel as possible to take part in the work. Local Tibetan personnel taking part in the military and administrative committee may include patriotic elements from the local government of Tibet, various districts and various principal monasteries; the name list shall be set forth after consultation between the representatives designated by the Central People's Government and various quarters concerned, and shall be submitted to the Central People's Government for appointment.
16. Funds needed by the military and administrative committee, the military area headquarters, and the People's Liberation Army entering Tibet shall be provided by the Central People's Government. The local government of Tibet should assist the People's Liberation Army in the purchase and transport of food, fodder and other daily necessities.
17. This agreement shall come into force immediately after signatures and seals are affixed to it.

=== Negotiations ===
The Tibetan delegation initially objected to point 1's reference to "invading imperialist forces" but later conceded that there may be such forces operating in Tibet that they were not aware of. Points 2 and 3 were queried for the meaning of "local government", although the meaning of "national regional autonomy" was not discussed, since the Tibetan delegation assumed that things would go on as before. Ngapoi's delegation tried to remove the guarantees of the power for the Panchen Lama in points 5 and 6, but the Chinese delegation countered that the Panchen Lama and the Dalai Lama should be treated in the same manner; either both have their power guaranteed, or neither does. The Tibetans conceded the point. Fundamental disagreements about point 8, the disbandment of the Tibetan army, resulted in a promise to renegotiate the issue later. The most contentious point was 15, concerning the establishment of a military and administrative committee, since Tibetan delegation felt that it contradicted point 11 about the local Tibetan government conducting reforms on its own. Most of the other points were accepted without comment, or with minor translation adjustments. In order to avoid embarrassment for the Chinese delegation, accommodations to the Tibetan delegation about issues like the maintenance of the Tibetan army were to be concluded subsequently in separate, secret agreements.

=== Signing of the agreement ===
The agreement was signed by Ngapoi Ngawang Jigme, who advocated Tibetan acquiescence to China, and sealed in Beijing on 23 May 1951 and confirmed by the government in Tibet a few months later. In addition, a public announcement was made by the Dalai Lama to ratify the agreement, his acceptance also being sent to Beijing in the form of a telegram on 24 October 1951:

"This year, the plenipotentiary of the Tibetan Local Government, Ngapoi Ngawang Jigme and other five people, arrived in Beijing at the end of April 1951 to conduct peace talks with the plenipotentiary designated by the Central People’s Government. On the basis of friendship, representatives of the both sides signed the agreement on measures for the peaceful liberation of Tibet on 23 May 1951. The Tibet Local Government, as well as ecclesiastic and secular folk, unanimously support this agreement, and under the leadership of Chairman Mao and the Central People's Government, will actively support the People's Liberation Army in Tibet in consolidating national defense, drive out imperialist influences from Tibet, and safeguard the unification of the territory and the sovereignty of the Motherland."

Mao Zedong replied on 24 October 1951:

Your telegraph on October 24, 1951 has already been received. I thank you for your efforts to implement the agreement on the peaceful liberation of Tibet, and I would like to extend my heartfelt congratulations.

According to the Tibetan government-in-exile, some members of the Tibetan Cabinet (Kashag), for example, Tibetan Prime Minister Lukhangwa, never accepted the agreement. But the National Assembly of Tibet, "while recognizing the extenuating circumstances under which the delegates had to sign the 'agreement', asked the government to accept the 'agreement' ... the Kashag told Zhang Jingwu that it would radio its acceptance of the 'agreement'."

== Repudiation of the agreement ==
As documented by the International Commission of Jurists, the legal grounds for Tibet's valid refutation were that multiple "undertakings had been violated" by China, those undertakings specifically included within the Seventeen-Point agreement.

On the same day in March 1959, Tibet also declared its independence from China during the 1959 Tibetan uprising, which was directly triggered on March 9 by a widespread concern for the Dalai Lama's safety, before he escaped from Lhasa and arrived in India on March 19. Later on June 20, a press conference was held in Mussoorie, India, where further statements were made concerning Tibet's legal revocation of the agreement.

The signing of the Seventeen-Point agreement is also contested as invalid in the Tibetan exile community, who charged that the Tibet delegates were forced to sign under duress and that the Chinese allegedly used forged Tibetan government seals. The exile community and their supporters continue to assert that the Tibetan representatives were not allowed to suggest any alterations and that the Chinese government did not allow the Tibetan representatives to communicate with Lhasa.

German legal scholar Eckart Klein considers the agreement invalid and as having been signed under duress.

According to Tibetologist Melvyn Goldstein, the agreement may still be valid even if signed under military threat by the Chinese, but not if the Tibetan negotiators did not have the powers to concede to the Chinese:

The Chinese did make new seals for the Tibetans, but these were just personal seals with each delegate's name carved on them. Other than this, there were no forged government seals. Part of the confusion derives from the fact that Ngabo had in his possession the seal of the governor of Eastern Tibet but chose not to use it. That seal, however, was not the official seal of the Tibetan government, so not using it did not lessen the validity of the agreement. In his autobiography, the Dalai Lama states that the Tibetan delegates claimed they were forced 'under duress' to sign the agreement ... Their feeling of duress derives from the general Chinese threat to use military force again in Central Tibet if an agreement was not concluded. However, according to international law, this does not invalidate an agreement. So long as there is no physical violence against the signatories, an agreement is valid. However, the validity of the agreement is premised on the signatories' full authority to finalize an agreement, and this, as we saw was clearly not the case. So in this sense, the Dalai Lama actually had grounds to disavow it.

In September 1951, the United States informed the Dalai Lama that in order to receive assistance and support from the United States, he must depart from Tibet and publicly disavow "agreements concluded under duress" between the representatives of Tibet and Chinese communists.

Eight years after the agreement was signed and ratified, on the path that was leading him into exile in India, the 14th Dalai Lama arrived 26 March 1959 at Lhuntse Dzong, where he repudiated the Seventeen Point Agreement as having been "thrust upon Tibetan Government and people by the threat of arms" and reaffirmed his government as the only legitimate representative of Tibet. On 20 June 1959, at a press conference convened at Mussoorie, the 14th Dalai Lama repudiated the agreement once more, explaining that, "since China herself had broken the terms of her own Agreement, there could no longer be any legal basis for recognizing it."

In his essay Hidden Tibet: History of Independence and Occupation published by the Library of Tibetan Works and Archives at Dharamsala, S.L. Kuzmin writes that the Agreement had critical defects. The use of newly made personal seals instead of official governmental seals was not legal. The Tibetan delegates exceeded their authority by signing the Agreement without the approval from the Dalai Lama and the Kashag. The preamble to the Agreement contained ideological cliches that do not correspond to reality. The Chinese government ordered PLA soldiers that entered Tibet to command the "local" government to send their people for negotiations with the center (i.e. central government); the contracting parties acknowledged this in the Preamble and Point 2, so the agreement was signed under a military threat. The Agreement was drawn up in such a way that a number of terms were ambiguous and allowed for different interpretations by the Chinese and the Tibetans. It also contains some internal contradictions.

== Legacy ==
The most important parts of the seventeen point agreement which benefited China were the first, eighth and fourteenth points of the agreement. The first point annexed Tibet as a part of China and turned it into Chinese territory. This was heavily enforced by China whose occupation of Tibet and enforcement of China's norms and customs were imperative towards the assimilation of Tibet into China. In addition, the fourteenth point of the agreement gave China the power to usurp external affairs from Tibet. As a result, China was able to control Tibetan international affairs, trade, borders and relationships. This effect continues to play a role as seen in the India-China border dispute. Lastly, the eighth point was crucial towards China's further annexation and development of Tibet into China. By incorporating their military into the province they ensured continued Chinese rule and assimilation in the region.

Point 3 in the agreement defines Tibet's status under the PRC as an autonomous region under the Chinese government, and that a policy of one country two systems would be followed with Tibet. The fourth, fifth, and sixth points in the agreement further consolidate this system, promising Tibet that China would not intervene in the Tibetan government status and politics. However, the Tibetan government holds that to date, these clauses promising regional autonomy and freedom to the Tibetan people have not been honored by the PRC government. While the Chinese occupation of Tibet led to the exile of the Dalai Lama, China has thereafter tightened security measures in Tibet. Furthermore, recent cases such as the kidnapping of the chosen Penchen Lama, the nomination of the 11th Penchen Lama by the Chinese government, and the case of monks and nuns at the Dorje Drak monastery being forced to sign banners supporting Communist Party policies are further signs of Chinese influence and intervention in Tibetan politics.

Lhasa Tibetan, the main indigenous language of Tibet, has undergone various periods of acceptance and promotion in schools to banishment and suppression. Schooling and the Chinese government's policy of establishing Mandarin as the official and common language of China has led to a decline in the use of the Tibetan language. There are now fewer contexts where it is spoken in Tibet and is not as widely taught in schools as it had been in previous decades. Like the Tibetan language, trade and the Tibetan government's control over it has seen great variation since 1951. Points 10, 11, and 13 address Tibet's autonomy in deciding reforms and their economy. China's policies such as the 2019–2020 Farmer and Pastoralist Training and Labor Action Plan, which was implemented to alleviate poverty, forced Tibetan farmers to give up their land rights and relocate to urban areas to work as wage laborers. As of 2020, Tibetan officials were given quotas for the number of Tibetans that needed to be enrolled in such programs.

== See also ==
- 13-Article Ordinance for the More Effective Governing of Tibet
- 29-Article Ordinance for the More Effective Governing of Tibet
- Golden Urn
- 70,000 Character Petition
- Annexation of Tibet by the People's Republic of China
- Foreign relations of Tibet
- History of Tibet
