= Direct-administered municipality =

Highest level of classification for cities in China

Municipality 直辖市 Zhíxiáshì
- Number: 4 (Beijing, Chongqing, Shanghai, and Tianjin)

A direct-administered municipality (直辖市; Zhíxiáshì; municipality), constitutionally known as city directly under central government jurisdiction, is a provincial-level administrative division and province equivalent in China. Although designated as cities, they encompass a central urban area together with extensive surrounding suburban and rural areas, making them considerably larger than most cities. There are four such municipalities: Beijing, Chongqing, Shanghai, and Tianjin.

== History ==
During the Republic of China, the first group of municipalities directly affiliated with the central government was the 11 cities of Nanjing, Shanghai, Beijing, Tianjin, Qingdao, Chongqing, Xi'an, Guangzhou, Hankou (now part of Wuhan), Shenyang, and Harbin. They were established in 1927 soon after they were designated as "cities" during the 1920s. Nominally, Dalian was a municipality as well, although it was under Japanese control. These cities were first called special municipalities/cities (特别市; tèbiéshì), but were later renamed Yuan-controlled municipalities (院辖市; yuànxiáshì), then direct-controlled municipalities (直辖市; zhíxiáshì) by the Central Government of the People's Republic of China.

After the establishment of the People's Republic of China in 1949, Anshan, Benxi, and Fushun were also made municipalities, while Qingdao, Dalian, and Harbin were reduced to provincial municipalities. Hankou was merged into Wuhan, which became a municipality of its own. Hence, there remained 12 municipalities. In November 1952, Nanjing was reduced to a provincial municipality in Jiangsu. In March 1953, Lüda, which had resulted from the merger of Dalian and Lüshun in December 1950, was made a municipality. In July 1953, Harbin was restored to municipality status, whereas Changchun acquired that status for the first time. Except Beijing and Tianjin, which were under central control, all other municipalities were governed by the greater administrative areas.

In June 1954, 11 of the 14 municipalities were reduced to sub-provincial cities; many of them became capitals of the provinces they were in. Only Beijing, Shanghai, and Tianjin remained municipalities, until Chongqing was restored as a municipality in 1997 with a much enlarged area. Tianjin was also temporarily reverted to sub-provincial city status between 1958 and 1967.

== Position in hierarchy ==
Municipalities are the highest-ranked cities in the PRC. Some cities of lower levels may also refer to themselves as municipalities in the English language.

Three levels of cities in the People's Republic of China:

1. Municipalities (直辖市; 直轄市; zhíxiáshì);
2. Prefecture-level cities (地级市; 地級市; dìjíshì), including sub-provincial cities; and,
3. County-level cities (县级市; 縣級市; xiànjíshì), including sub-prefectural cities.

== Administration ==
In municipalities, the highest ranking government official is the mayor. The mayor is also a delegate in the National People's Congress (the legislature) and deputy secretary of the Chinese Communist Party (CCP) Municipal Committee. However, the highest administrative authority in the municipality belongs to the Chinese Communist Party Committee Secretary.

== Current municipalities ==
ISO	Division name	Simplified Chinese	Hanyu Pinyin	Abbr.	Population	Area (km^{2})	Divisions	City seat	Origin Province (split date)	Origin Prefecture	Origin County
CN-11	Beijing	北京市	Běijīng Shì	京 jīng	19,612,368	16,801	List (16 districts)	Tongzhou	Hebei (Oct. 1949)	Shuntian	Daxing
CN-12	Tianjin	天津市	Tiānjīn Shì	津 jīn	12,938,224	11,760	List (16 districts)	Hexi	Hebei (Jan. 1967)	Tianjin	Tianjin
CN-31	Shanghai	上海市	Shànghǎi Shì	沪 hù	23,019,148	6,340	List (16 districts)	Huangpu	Jiangsu (Mar. 1927)	Songjiang	Shanghai
CN-50	Chongqing	重庆市	Chóngqìng Shì	渝 yú	28,846,170 (City Core 16,240,026)	82,300 (City Core 6,268)	List (26 districts, 8 counties, & 4 autonomous counties) (City Core: 19 districts)	Yuzhong	Sichuan (May 1997)	Chongqing	Ba

=== Government ===
Name	Communist Party		Executive		Legislature		Advisory	
Name	Party Committee	Party Secretary	Government	Mayor	City Council	No. of seats	CPPCC Committee	Chair
Beijing	Beijing Municipal Party Committee	Yin Li	Beijing Municipal People's Government	Yin Yong	Beijing Municipal People's Congress	755	Beijing Municipal Committee	Wei Xiaodong
Tianjin	Tianjin Municipal Party Committee	Chen Min'er	Tianjin Municipal People's Government	Zhang Gong	Tianjin Municipal People's Congress	706	Tianjin Municipal Committee	Wang Changsong
Shanghai	Shanghai Municipal Party Committee	Chen Jining	Shanghai Municipal People's Government	Gong Zheng	Shanghai Municipal People's Congress	855	Shanghai Municipal Committee	Hu Wenrong
Chongqing	Chongqing Municipal Party Committee	Yuan Jiajun	Chongqing Municipal People's Government	Hu Henghua	Chongqing Municipal People's Congress	860	Chongqing Municipal Committee	Cheng Lihua

== Former ROC and PRC municipalities ==
Name	Simplified Chinese	Pinyin	Abbr.	City seat	Administration period	Original province	Original prefecture	Original county
Jingdu	京都市	Jīngdū Shì	京 jīng	Dongcheng	1921–1927	Zhili (present province: Hebei)	Shuntian	Daxing
Jingu	津沽市	Jīngū Shì	津 jīn	Heping	1921–1927	Zhili (present province: Hebei)	Tianjin	Tianjin
Songhu	淞沪市	Sōnghù Shì	沪 hù	Huangpu	1921–1927	Jiangsu	Songjiang	Shanghai
Qingdao	青岛市	Qīngdǎo Shì	青 qīng	Shinan	1921–1927, 1929–1949	Shandong	Jiaozhou	Jiao
Harbin	哈尔滨市	Hārbīn Shì	哈 hā	Nangang	1921–1927, 1947–1949, 1953–1954	Songjiang (present province: Heilongjiang)	Binzhou	Bin
Hankou	汉口市	Hànkǒu Shì	汉 hàn	Jiang'an	1921–1927, 1929–1931, 1947–1949	Hubei	Hanyang	Hanyang
Wuxi	无锡市	Wúxī Shì	锡 xī	Binhu	1921–1927	Jiangsu	Changzhou	Wuxi
Hangzhou	杭州市	Hángzhōu Shì	杭 háng	Gongshu	1921–1927	Zhejiang	Hangzhou	Yuhang
Ningbo	宁波市	Níngbō Shì	甬 yǒng	Yinzhou	1921–1927	Zhejiang	Ningbo	Yin
Anqing	安庆市	Ānqìng Shì	安 ān	Daguan	1921–1927	Anhui	Anqing	Huaining
Nanchang	南昌市	Nánchāng Shì	洪 hóng	Donghu	1921–1927	Jiangxi	Nanchang	Nanchang
Wuchang	武昌市	Wǔchāng Shì	武 wǔ	Wuchang	1921–1927	Hubei	Wuchang	Jiangxia
Guangzhou	广州市	Guǎngzhōu Shì	穗 suì	Yuexiu	1921–1927, 1930, 1947–1954	Guangdong	Guangzhou	Panyu; Nanhai
Wuzhou	梧州市	Wúzhōu Shì	梧 wú	Changzhou	1921–1927	Guangxi	Wuzhou	Cangwu
Nanjing	南京市	Nánjīng Shì	宁 níng	Xuanwu	1927–1952	Jiangsu	Jiangning	Jiangning
Xi'an	西安市	Xī'ān Shì	鎬 hào	Weiyang	1927–1954	Shaanxi	Xi'an	Chang'an
Wuhan	武汉市	Wǔhàn Shì	汉 hàn	Jiang'an	1927–1929, 1949	Hubei	Hanyang; Wuchang	Hanyang; Jiangxia
Beiping	北平市	Jīngdū Shì	平 píng	Dongcheng	1928–1949	Zhili (present province: Hebei)	Shuntian	Daxing
Dalian	大连市	Dàlián Shì	连 lián	Xigang	1947–1949	Andong/Liaodong (present province: Liaoning)	Jinzhou	Ninghai
Shenyang	沈阳市	Shěnyáng Shì	沈 shěn	Shenhe	1947–1954	Liaoxi (present province: Liaoning)	Fengtian	Fengtian
Anshan	鞍山市	Ānshān Shì	鞍 ān	Tiedong	1949–1954	Andong/Liaodong (present province: Liaoning)	Liaoyang	Haicheng; Liaoyang
Benxi	本溪市	Běnxī Shì	本 běn	Pingshan	1949–1954	Andong/Liaodong (present province: Liaoning)	Fengtian	Benxi
Fushun	抚顺市	Fǔshùn Shì	抚 fǔ	Xinfu	1949–1954	Andong/Liaodong (present province: Liaoning)	Fengtian	Fushun
Lüda	旅大市	Lǚdà Shì	旅 lǚ	Xigang	1950–1954	Lüda (present province: Liaoning)	Jinzhou	Ninghai
Changchun	长春市	Chángchūn Shì	春 chūn	Nanguan	1953–1954	Jilin	Changchun	Changchun

== See also ==
- Independent city
  - Special municipality (Taiwan)
  - Special cities of North Korea
  - List of provincial-level cities of South Korea
  - Municipalities of Vietnam
- Federal city
  - Federal cities of Russia — similar systems
- Imperial immediacy
