= Jiang Jie =

Jiang Jie may refer to:

- Jiang Zhuyun, Chinese communist resistance fighter and revolutionary martyr
- Jiang Jie (artist), Chinese artist
- Jiang Jie (politician), Chinese politician, vice chairman of the Xizang Autonomous Regional Committee of the Chinese People's Political Consultative Conference and executive vice chairman of the Xizang Autonomous Regional People's Government
