= Tourism in Tibet =

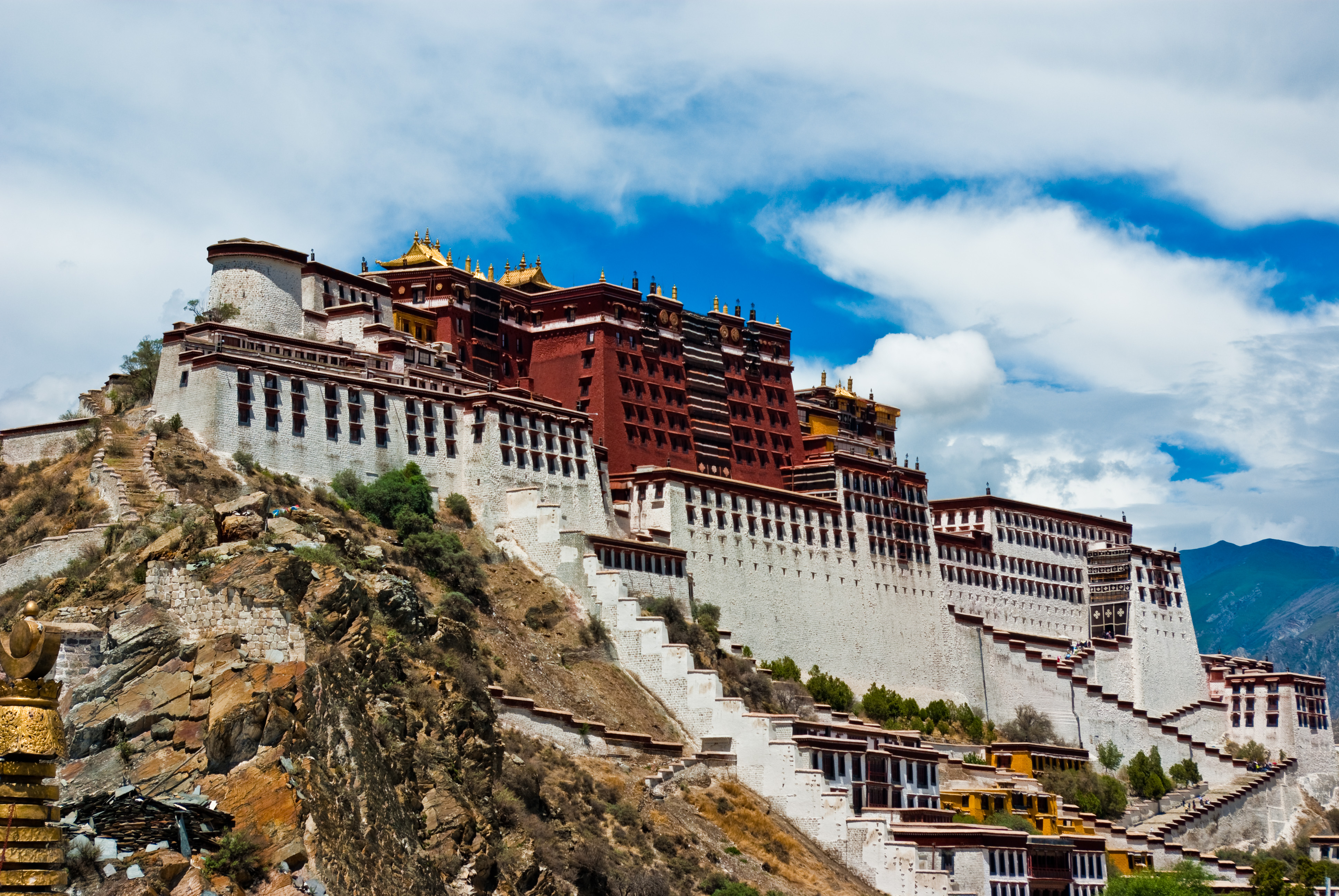
Potala Palace in Lhasa, the capital of Tibet

Tourism in the China-controlled Tibet Autonomous Region has recently emerged as a pivotal driver of economic development. In 2015, the region attracted over 20 million visitors, generating an annual tourism revenue of 28 billion RMB. This represented over 25% of Tibet's GDP and contributed more than 20% to the region's overall economic growth. However, the influx of tourists has adversely impacted the region's ecological environment, as well as Tibetan culture and traditions. In response, initiatives have been implemented to safeguard local businesses and support the development of tourism infrastructure.

== Industrial development ==
After the completion of the Qinghai–Tibet Railway in July 2006, tourism in Tibet grew rapidly. That year, Tibet attracted over 2.5 million tourists, including 150,000 international visitors. By 2007, the number of visitors had increased to approximately 4 million. However, the 2008 Tibetan unrest led to the closure of tourist sites and attractions between March and June, causing visits to decline to 2.25 million that year.

Between January and June 2009, over 2.7 million tourists visited Tibet, three times the number from the same period in 2008, generating 2.29 billion RMB in local revenue. In 2010, Tibet welcomed 6.85 million domestic and international tourists, generating tourism revenues of 7.14 billion RMB, or 14 percent of its GDP. Between January and November 2012, Tibet set a record with 10 million visitors, surpassing the 8.69 million recorded in 2011. In 2015, the number of tourists surpassed 20 million for the first time. By 2023, Tibet set a new record with 55 million visitors, 15 times the region's local population.

== Travel resources ==
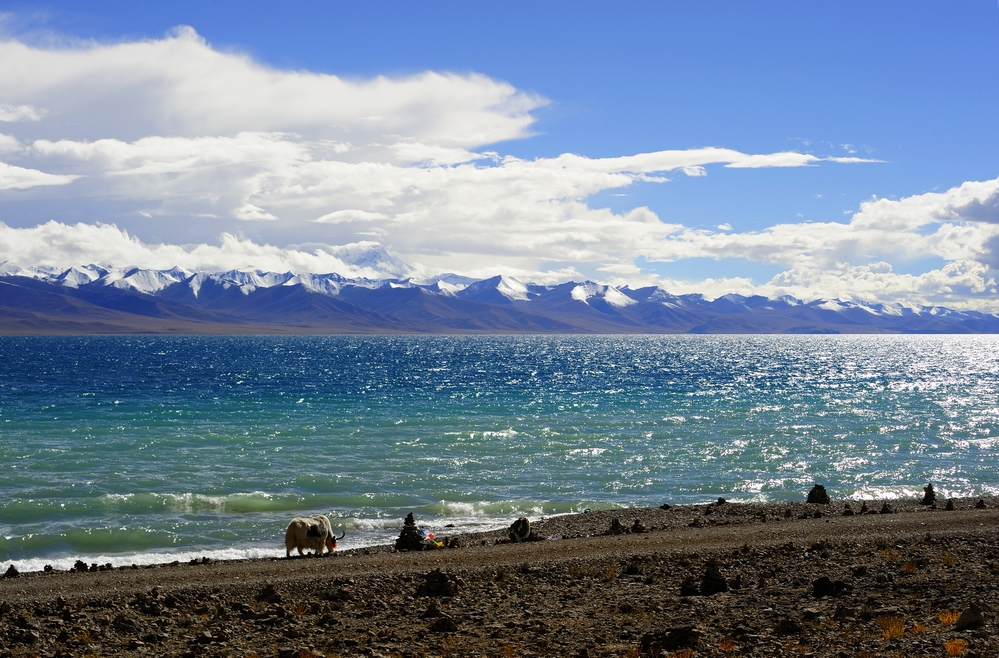
Namtso, the second-largest lake in Tibet

=== Natural landscape ===
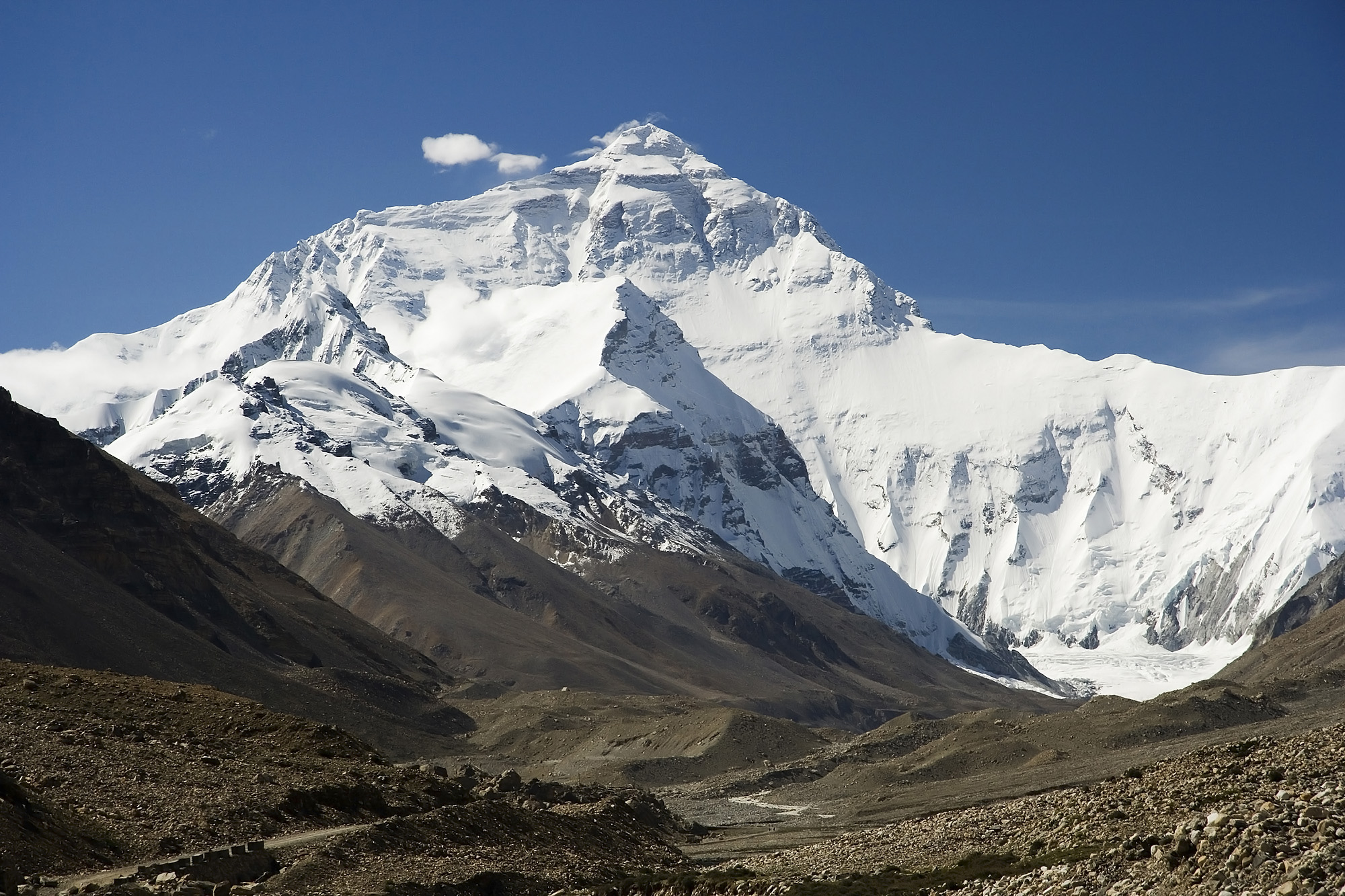
Mount Everest North Slope

The natural landscape of Tibet is categorized into three distinct regions: the temperate and humid alpine valleys of eastern Tibet, the alpine mountains and semi-arid river valleys of southern and western Tibet, and the alpine plateau deserts and meadows of northern and northwestern Tibet. The Tibetan Plateau, a vast expanse of interconnected mountain systems, plateaus, broad valleys, and lake basins, is bordered by the Himalayan, Gangdisê, Tanggula, and Kunlun mountain ranges, resulting in a diverse range of topographical and geomorphological features.

=== Cultural attractions ===
Cultural attractions in Tibet include the region's unique way of life, ethnic customs, and temple traditions. According to the results of the third national cultural relics census, Tibet is home to 4,277 immovable cultural heritage sites. Notable historical and cultural cities include Lhasa, Shigatse, and Gyantse. Key attractions include the Potala Palace, the Jokhang Temple, the Norbulingka, the Tashi Lhunpo Monastery; as well as natural features such as the Himalayas (including Mount Everest), Mount Kailash, Namucuo, Yamdrok Lake, and Yangbajing (with its hot springs and glaciers).

The Potala Palace, located in the heart of Lhasa, was designated a UNESCO World Heritage Site in 1994. To mitigate the impact of tourism on the palace's delicate adobe architecture, visitor numbers and visiting hours are strictly regulated. As a result, obtaining tickets to visit can be challenging during peak tourist seasons.

=== Holiday celebrations ===
Tourism festivals are organized across Tibet to draw visitors and promote the region's cultural heritage. Many of these festivals carry significant religious undertones. Festival tourism has become a significant driver of tourism development in Tibet. Among these, Tibetan New Year stands as the most important festival in the region.

The Lhasa Snowdon Festival is held annually from June 15th to July 30th according to the Tibetan calendar. During this time, the festival features a grand Sunbathing Buddha ceremony and vibrant performances of Tibetan opera.

Additionally, Tibet hosts a variety of other festivals and events, including the Monlam Prayer Festival, the Merangi Small Puja, the Ongkor Festival, the Arrow Plugging Festival, the Snana Yatra, the Lunar New Year Bratva Jumping Assembly. Other festivals include the Peach Blossom Festival in Linzhi in spring, the Yalong Cultural Festival in Shannan, the Everest Cultural Festival in Shigatse, and the Tibet Tourism and Cultural Expo.

== Travel procedures ==
=== Chinese citizens ===
Chinese citizens are allowed to travel to the Tibet Autonomous Region with their government-issued IDs. Self-guided tour and backpacking are allowed without the need to engage with any travel agency. The permitted form of IDs for Chinese citizens are:

- Residents of Chinese provinces, municipalities, and autonomous regions — Resident Identity Card (居民身份证) or Chinese passport (中国护照).
- Residents of Chinese special administrative regions — Mainland Travel Permit for Hong Kong and Macao Resident (港澳居民来往内地通行证), however holders of those Travel Permits annotated with Non-Chinese Citizens (非中国籍) should follow the regulations designated for foreigners.
- Residents of foreign countries (Overseas Chinese) — Chinese passport (中国护照) or Chinese Travel Document (中国旅行证).

For Chinese citizens aged 16 or older who wish to travel to specific frontier areas, a separate Border Administration Area Permit (边境管理区通行证 or 边防证) will need to be granted by the Regional Government's Public Security Bureau. Note that this application process only accepts Resident Identity Card or Mainland Travel Permit as IDs, overseas Chinese citizens who only have Chinese passport or Chinese Travel Document are not eligible to travel to these areas.

=== Foreign citizens and Taiwanese citizens ===
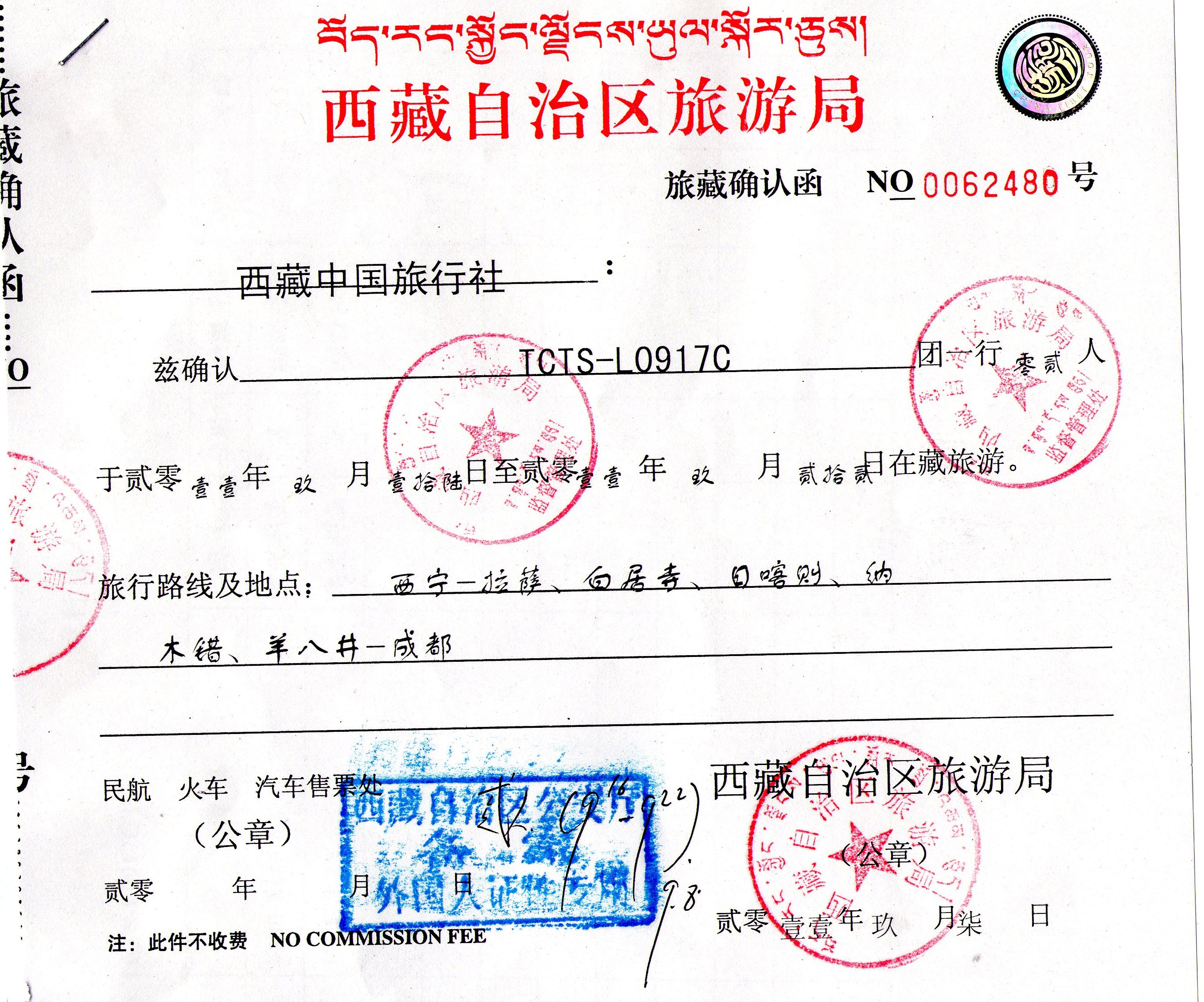
Example of Tibet Travel Permit for foreign citizens

Foreign and Taiwanese travelers may only visit the Tibet Autonomous Region by participating package tours organized by a licensed Tibetan travel agency. In addition to comply with the visa policy of China, a separate Tibet Travel Permit (入藏函), or formally called the Confirmation letter for entering Tibet (进藏确认函), is required to be granted before booking the transportation into Tibet. Applications for a Tibet Travel Permit can only be made by travel agencies licensed in Tibet to appropriate offices of the Regional Government. It is advised to apply at least 40 days before departure.

This policy is in accordance with the regulations set forth by the China National Tourism Administration. Tibet's unique location in a plateau mountain environment, along with its distinct ethnic traditions, cultural monuments, and environmental considerations, necessitate specific tourism policies. Due to the region's limited transportation infrastructure and tourist service facilities, measures have been implemented to ensure the safety, order, and availability of medical resources for visitors. For instance, international tourists are not permitted to travel independently in Tibet; they must participate in organized and guided group tours.

Travelers wishing to enter the Tibet Autonomous Region can complete the required procedures at the Autonomous Region's delegation offices in Beijing, Shanghai, Chengdu, and Golmud, or they may appoint a travel agent to handle the process on their behalf. Once the necessary steps are completed, the travel agency will be issued the Tibet Travel Permit, which can then be used to purchase air or bus tickets to Tibet.

- Foreign citizens — provide a copy of their passport (or travel document), Chinese visa (tourist visa, or L visa, not required if from a visa-free country), the application will be filed by the travel agency together with the itinerary booked to the Department of Culture and Tourism (文化和旅游厅) of the Regional Government. Note that foreign citizens holding a non-tourist visa are in general not allowed to travel to Tibet. Foreign citizens holding a business visa (M or F visa) or study visa (X visa) must provide certification from the relevant local authorities in Tibet. Journalists (J visa) or those holding official visas must coordinate with China's foreign affairs departments to obtain the necessary permissions for travel.
- Taiwanese citizens — provide a copy of their Mainland Travel Permit for Taiwan Resident (台湾居民来往大陆通行证), the application will be filed by the travel agency together with the itinerary booked to the Taiwan Affairs Office (台湾事务办公室) of the Regional Government.

Foreign and Taiwanese travelers will have their Tibet Travel Permit checked at airports, railway stations, and road checkpoints. Upon arrival in Tibet, these permits must be handed over to the group guide for safekeeping. At the conclusion of the trip, the travel agency needs to return the permit to the issuing authorities of the Regional Government for official filing. The Tibet Travel Permit cannot be taken out of the Autonomous Region.

Foreign and Taiwanese travelers who wish to travel to specific frontier areas, a separate permit will need to be granted by the Regional Government's Public Security Bureau (PSB). Application for this PSB Permit or Border Pass, formally called the Aliens' Travel Permit (外国人旅行证) for foreigners and Border Administration Area Permit (边境管理区通行证) for Taiwanese, shall be submitted by the travel agency upon an approved Tibet Travel Permit.

If the itinerary also covers some specific non-opened or frontier area, additional permit may also be required by other authorities:

- Foreign Affairs Permit — Issued by the Regional Government's Foreign Affairs Office (外事办公室) to allow travel group to enter the non-opened areas of the Autonomous Region.
- Military Permit — Issued by the People's Liberation Army's Tibet Military District Command (西藏军区司令部) to allow travel group to go through the proxy of military facilities.

The additional permit requirements are based on Tibet's proximity to countries such as India and Pakistan, certain border regions are considered sensitive for national defense and require special clearance.

== Media ==
Tourism in Tibet is a comprehensive monthly magazine focusing on tourism, fashion, and culture, and is sponsored by the Tibet Autonomous Region Tourism Bureau. The magazine highlights Tibet's unique geography and rich cultural heritage, while also offering valuable travel tips and information to readers.

== See also ==
- Tourism in China
