= Jiang Jie (politician) =

Chinese politician

- 姜杰
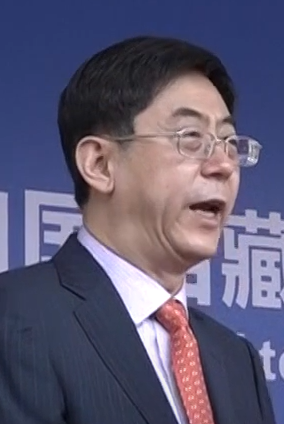
- Jiang in 2021

Vice Chairman of the Xizang Autonomous Regional Committee of the Chinese People's Political Consultative Conference
- In office January 2022 – August 2023
- Chairman: Pagbalha Geleg Namgyai

Executive Vice Chairman of the Xizang Autonomous Regional People's Government
- In office December 2016 – December 2021
- Chairman: Losang Jamcan; Che Dalha
- Preceded by: Deng Xiaogang
- Succeeded by: Ren Wei (politician)

Vice Chairman of the Xizang Autonomous Regional People's Government
- In office June 2013 – December 2016
- Chairman: Padma Choling; Losang Jamcan

Personal details
- Born: October 1965 (age 60–61) Jiao County, Shandong, China
- Party: Chinese Communist Party (1985–2024; expelled)
- Education: Shandong University; Renmin University of China

Jiang Jie (Chinese: 姜杰; pinyin: Jiāng Jié; born October 1965) is a former Chinese politician. He was investigated by China's top anti-graft agency in July 2025. Previously he served as executive vice chairman of the Xizang Autonomous Regional People's Government and vice chairman of the Xizang Autonomous Regional Committee of the Chinese People's Political Consultative Conference. He was a representative of the 18th National Congress of the Chinese Communist Party.

== Early life and education ==
Jiang was born in Jiao County (now Jiaozhou), Shandong, in October 1965. In 1981, he enrolled at Shandong University, where he majored in history. He joined the Chinese Communist Party (CCP) in April 1985, upon graduation. He obtained a PhD in management from Renmin University of China in 2006.

== Career ==
After university in 1985, Jiang became a reporter of Qingdao Daily.

Jiang got involved in politics in May 1991, when he was appointed secretary of the Inspection Department of the General Office of the CCP Qingdao Municipal Committee. He was director of the European and American Investment Affairs Office of Qingdao Branch of the China International Trade Fair in December 1994 and subsequently vice president of Qingdao Branch of China Council for the Promotion of International Trade (China Chamber of International Commerce) in September 1998. He served as governor of Huangdao District from 2000 to 2002, and party secretary, the top political position in the district, from 2002 to 2011. He also served as director and secretary of the Party Working Committee of Qingdao Economic and Technological Development Zone.

Jiang became mayor of Dongying, a prefecture-level city, in June 2011, and then party secretary, the top political position in the city, beginning in December 2011. He also served as chairperson of the Dongying Municipal People's Congress, the city's top legislative body, from March 2012 to June 2013.

In June 2013, Jiang was transferred to southwest China's Xizang Autonomous Region and appointed vice chairman of the Xizang Autonomous Regional People's Government. He concurrently served as director of the Department of Transportation, head of the Publicity Department of the CCP Xizang Autonomous Regional Committee. In January 2016, he was admitted to standing committee member of the CCP Xizang Autonomous Regional Committee, the region's top authority. He was elevated to executive vice chairman of the Xizang Autonomous Regional People's Government in December 2016. In January 2022, he took office as vice chairman of the Xizang Autonomous Regional Committee of the Chinese People's Political Consultative Conference, the regional advisory body.

== Downfall ==
On 3 July 2023, Jiang was put under investigation for alleged "serious violations of discipline and laws" by the Central Commission for Discipline Inspection (CCDI), the party's internal disciplinary body, and the National Supervisory Commission, the highest anti-corruption agency of China.

On 5 January 2024, Jiang was stripped of his posts within the CCP and in the public office. On January 17, the Supreme People's Procuratorate signed an arrest order for him for taking bribes. On June 14, he was indicted on suspicion of accepting bribes. On July 17, he stood trial at the No. 1 Intermediate People's Court of Tianjin on charges of taking bribes, he was accused of abusing his powers in former positions he held between 2000 and 2023 to seek benefits for relevant organizations and individuals in administrative approval, engineering contracting, land transfer, and job promotion, in return, he accepted money and property worth over 225 million yuan ($31.45 million) either himself or via his family members. On December 12, he was sentenced to death with a two-year reprieve for bribery by Tianjin No. 1 Intermediate People's Court, he was also deprived of his political rights for life, and ordered by the court to have all his personal assets confiscated and turn over all illicit gains and their interests to the state.

Government offices
Preceded by Zhang Jianhua	Mayor of Dongying; 2011–2012	Succeeded by Shen Changyou
Preceded by Zhaxi Jiangcuo	Head of the Department of Transport of the Xizang Autonomous Region; 2015–2017	Succeeded by Yong Ji
Preceded by Deng Xiaogang	Executive Vice Chairman of the Xizang Autonomous Regional People's Government; 2016–2021	Succeeded by Ren Wei
Party political offices
Preceded by Zhang Qiubo	Communist Party Secretary of Dongying; 2012–2013	Succeeded by Liu Shihe
Preceded by Dong Yunhu	Head of the Publicity Department of Xizang Autonomous Regional Committee of the Chinese Communist Party; 2016	Succeeded by Bianba Zhaxi
Assembly seats
Preceded by ?	Chairman of Dongying Municipal People's Congress; 2012–2013	Succeeded by Liu Shihe
