= Yigong General's Building =

The Yigong General's Building (Chinese: 易贡将军楼) is situated within the Yigong Tea Plantation in Bomê County, Nyingchi Prefecture, Tibet Autonomous Region, China.

== History ==
This building, located in the Yigong Tea Plantation, occupies an area of approximately 500 square meters, with its upper outer walls painted red. It was originally constructed by Zhang Guohua, the commander of the 18th Army of the People's Liberation Army (PLA), during his campaign into Tibet through Yigong. The building also served as the headquarters of the 18th Army at that time.

By 2005, the building had sustained significant damage. In response, the Bomi County Committee of the Chinese Communist Party and the Bomi County People's Government decided to preserve the site as a red tourism attraction. The building was designated as a cultural heritage site by the county government, and a preservation agreement was signed with the Tibet Sun Company. The local government also secured special funding from higher authorities to carry out necessary repairs and maintenance. On November 19, 2009, the People's Government of the Tibet Autonomous Region approved the building as one of the fifth batch of Tibet Autonomous Region cultural relics protection units (Chinese: 西藏自治区文物保护单位).
