= Chongqing Municipal Supervisory Commission =

The Chongqing Municipal Supervisory Commission (Chinese: 重庆市监察委员会, 重庆市监察委), or Supervisory Commission of Chongqing Municipal, Chongqing Supervisory Commission is a provincial-level local state supervisory authority in Chongqing, co-located with the Disciplinary Inspection Committee of the Chongqing Municipal Committee of the Chinese Communist Party. It was established in January 2018 to assume the functions of the former Chongqing Municipal Supervisory Bureau. The director of the Chongqing Municipal Supervision Commission is elected by the Chongqing Municipal People's Congress and is accountable to both the Congress and its Standing Committee, as well as the Supervision Commission of the People's Republic of China.

== History ==
In November 2017, the Standing Committee of the Chongqing Municipal Committee of the Chinese Communist Party reviewed and approved the initiative to enhance the execution of the national supervision system reform pilot program, stipulating the establishment of municipal, district, and county-level supervision committees by the end of February 2018. On February 1, 2018, the Standing Committee of the CCP Chongqing Municipal Committee, along with Chen Yong, Director of the Municipal Commission for Discipline Inspection and the Municipal Supervisory Committee, unveiled a plaque for the Chongqing Municipal Supervisory Committee.
