= Shanghai delegation to the National People's Congress =

Shanghai Delegation to the National People's Congress
- 全国人民代表大会上海市代表团
- Delegation for the National People's Congress
- Map showing the location of Shanghai Municipality
- Electoral unit: Shanghai Municipality
- Population: 24,874,500

Current Delegation
- Created: 1954
- Seats: 57
- Head of delegation: Vacant
- Municipal People's Congress: Shanghai Municipal People's Congress

The Shanghai delegation to the National People's Congress is a delegation composed of deputies representing Shanghai Municipality in within the National People's Congress (NPC), the highest organ of state power of the People's Republic of China. NPC deputies from Shanghai Municipality are officially elected by the Shanghai Municipal People's Congress.

== List of deputies ==
Year	NPC sessions	Deputies	Number of deputies	Ref.
1954	1st	Wang Zhixin, Wang Xingyao, Wang Yu, Wang Shuzhen, Wang Jusheng, Wang Shusen, Bai Yang, Zhu Shunyu, Jiang Feng, Wu Kejian, Wu Ruoan, Wu Meisheng, Wu Xi, Wu Yaozong, Soong Ching-ling, Shen Kefei, Shen Zhiyuan, Shen Junru, Shen Dejian, Bei Shizhang, Zhou Xinfang, Meng Xiancheng, Hang Peilan, Lin Handa, Jin Zhonghua, Hu Ziying, Hu Juewen, Hu Yuzhi, Ji Haoran, Xia Yan, Yuan Xuefen, Yuan Rong, Ma Yanxiang, Zhang Fangzuo, Zhang Yuanji, Zhang Qi, Guo Dihuo, Chen Shiying, Chen Jiangong, Chen Wangdao, Chen Yun, Chen Yi, Lu Agou, Sheng Pihua, Tang Guifen, Tang Diyin, He Lüting, Xiang Shuxiang, Feng Depei, Huang Zuolin, Yang Zhihua, Yang Yitang, Ye Qisun, Yi Shijuan, Rong Yiren, Zhao Zukang, Liu Jingji, Liu Hongsheng, Pan Hannian, Kui Yanfang, Qian Duansheng, Qu Xixian, Wei Ru: By-election on June 15, 1956: Liu Shuzhou	63	
1959	2nd	Wang Huaichen, Wang Xingyao, Wang Shusen, Wang Shuzhen (female), Wang Jusheng, Zuo Shudong (female), Ye Qisun, Shi Mukang, Jiang Yong, Liu Nianyi, Liu Shuzhou, Liu Jingji, Shen Kefei, Shen Junru, Wang You, Song Qingling (female), Su Buqing, Li Fuxiang, Chen Yun, Chen Jianzhen, Chen Boda, Chen Jiangong, Chen Wangdao, Chen Yi, Wu Ruoan (female), Wu Meisheng, Wu Yaozong, Ouyang Yuqian, Zhang Fangzuo, Zhang Yuanji, Zhang Weizhen, Meng Qingyuan, Meng Xiancheng Jin Zhonghua, Zhou Zhihong, Zhou Xinfang, Ji Haoran, Zhao Zukang, Zhao Chaogou, Rong Yiren, Hu Ziying (female), Hu Juewen, Ke Qingshi, Yuan Xuefen (female), Xu Senyu, Cao Diqiu, Tang Guifen (female), Tang Diyin (female), Feng Depei, Xiang Shuxiang, Huang Zuolin, Shu Xincheng, Sheng Pihua, Cheng Menxue, Yi Shijuan (female), Yang Zhihua (female), Yang Fuzhen (female), Han Xinliang, Zhong Min, Yan Fuqing, Qu Xixian (female), Wei Ru, Tan Zhenlin	63	
1964	3rd	Ding Genfu, Ma Chungu, Ma Yisan, Fang Ming, Fang Fulin, Ji Haoran, Wang Huaichen, Wang Yinglai, Wang Liangmei, Wang Xingyao, Wang Shuzhen, Wang Jusheng, Wang Zhen, Zhi Shaoyan, Ba Jin, Feng Depei, Zuo Shudong, Li Yanzi, Lu Yudao, Lu Hefu, Ye Qisun, Jiang Houlin, Tang Diyin, Liu Zhiren, Liu Shuzhou, Liu Nianyi, Liu Jingji, Zhuang Xiaohui, Guan Jian, Guo Jingyi, Zhu Yuanding, Zhu Wuhua, Zhu Dexin, Qiao Shuoren, Sun Shibai, Sun Hongjun, Shen Yinmo, Shen Kefei, Shen Pinzhang, Wang You, Song Qingling, Song Jiwen, Ying Yuanyue, Shou Jinwen, Hua Yisheng, Su Yuanfu, Su Buqing, Li Gentong, Li Guohao, Li Chuwen Li Ruilin, Yang Zhihua, Yang Cunbin, Yang Junsheng, Yang Fuzhen, Wu Zhongyi, Wu Leyi, Wu Ruoan, Wu Meisheng, Wu Jingxiang, Wu Yaozong, Gu Chaohao, Zou Yuanxi, Zhang Huilan, Zhang Jiangshu, Zhang Guoquan, Zhang Weizhen, Zhang Qi, Zhang Ruifang, Lu Futang, Chen Yun, Chen Jianzhen, Chen Tongsheng, Chen Xiuzhen, Chen Boda, Chen Wangdao, Chen Mingshan, Chen Zhi, Chen Yi, Lin Zhaoqi, Yu Yongkang, Zhuo Biyu, Jin Zhonghua, Zhou Yutong, Zhou Guangyu, Zhou Tongqing, Zhou Zhihong, Zhou Xinfang, Meng Qingyuan, Meng Xiancheng, Shi Zijing, Shi Konghuai, Shi Ruzhang, Shi Huizhen, Zhu Gongjian, Zhao Zukang, Zhao Chaogou, Rong Renben, Rong Yiren, Hu ZiyingHu Wenyao, Hu Sheng, Hu Juewen, Hu Maolian, Ke Qingshi, Xian Wenhe, Zhong Min, Yao Zhen, Guo Xiuzhen, Tang Yingbin, Tan Jiazhen, Yuan Xuefen, Qian Baojun, Xu Mingquan, Xu Zhongji, Xu Senyu, Yin Hongzhang, Sa Benxin, Cao Diqiu, Tu Kaiyuan, Tong Cun, Huang Zuolin, Huang Minglong, Jiang Lansun, Jiang Xiaoyun, Ge Helin, Dong Chenglang, Han Xinliang, Cheng Menxue, Fu Peibin, Yi Shijuan, Lei Xinghan, Tan Qixiang, Tan Zhenlin, Pan Zupei, Pan Shunkang, Yan Fuqing, Dai Hong, Wei Ru, Qu Xixian	140	
1975	4th	Ma Tianshui, Ma Xiuying (female), Ma Chungu, Ma Zhenlong, Wang Yonghai, Wang Yunsheng, Wang Xiuzhen (female), Wang Aniu, Wang Linhe, Wang Jinyuan, Wang Shuyuan, Wang Hongwen, Wang Debao, Fang Fengdi (female), Zuo Ying (female), Ye Shengtao, Ye Changming, Shi Liang (female), Bai Guangbiao, Feng Guozhu, Feng Ruiyun, Lü Shuxiang, Lü Meiying (female), Zhu Yongjia, Zhu Kejiang, Zhu Afeng (female), Zhu Gendi (female), Zhu Fengbo (female), Zhu Jian'er, Zhu Yunshan, Qiao Huogen, Qiao Shiqiong (female), Ren Jiyu, Ren Xinmin, Ren Xikang, Hua Luogeng, Zhuang Xiquan, Liu Danian, Liu Dajie, Liu Nianzhi, Liu Rongxing, Liu Zhenxiu (female), Liu Jingji, Xu Jie, Sun Guoying (female), Sun Qimeng, Ji Jinhong (female), Hua Yisheng, Hua Fenzhen (female), Yan Jici Li Dagui, Li Hongbao (female), Li Lifang (female), Li Xifan, Li Bingshu (female), Li Binshan, Yang Qiaodi (female), Yang Huifen (female), Yang Peilian (female), Yang Zhongjian, Yang Lianying (female), Yang Guiying (female), Yang Kuan, Yang Jiachi, Xiao Mu, Wu Yuqin (female), Wu Lengxi, Wu Ruoan (female), Wu Jinzhu (female), Wu Yaozong, He Rongfang (female), Yu Qindi (female), Min Huifen (female), Sha Qianli, Shen Youjiang, Shen Zhiyuan, Shen Pinzhang, Shen Shunlong, Shen Hengjin, Shen Yanbing, Shen Derong, Song Qingling (female), Zhang Wenyu, Zhang Zhirang, Zhang Guojun, Zhang Chunqiao, Zhang Pinfang (female), Zhang Xiangtong, Zhang Meijuan (female), Zhang Dingcheng, Lu Aqi, Lu Huangen, Chen Xiaomei (female), Chen Yuanfu, Chen Zhongwei, Chen Ada, Chen GuoxiangChen Mingqi, Chen Wangdao, Chen Hongxian, Chen Zhi, Chen Fu, Mao Yisheng, Lin Yaohua, Luo Shuzhang (female), Ji Fang, Jin Ying (female), Jin Zumin, Zhou Huifen (female), Pang Fuli, Zheng Geming (female), Zhao Puchu, Zhao Zhiming, Zhao Hongben, Zhao Zhongyao, Zhao Zhongguang, Zhao Zukang, Zhao Chaogou, Zhao Huiqin (female), Zhao Gengrong, Rong Yiren, Hu Ziying (female), Hu Shiquan, Hu Baohua, Hu Sheng, Hu Juewen, Hu Yuzhi, Yu Liyao, Shi Guohua, Zhu Xijuan (female), Yao Wenyuan, Yao Yongyang, Qin Baozhi, Qin Jiaxin (female), Yuan Shuipai, Jia Yibin, Jia Huixian (female), Chai Xiongchang, Gu Gongxu, Gu Jiegang, Qian Changzhao, Ni Zhiqin Ni Qinlan (female), Xu Jindi (female), Xu Yimin, Xu Yinsheng, Xu Hui (female), Xu Dianhong, Yin Hong, Ling Jinying (female), Tang Tao, Tan Jiazhen, Sang Hu, Huang Shidi (female), Huang Yong'an, Huang Jinhai, Cao Yangbao, Gong Liyan (female), Gong Yinbing, Sheng Wencui (female), Cui Qi, Ge Heying (female), Ge Jing'en, Dong Chenglang, Dong Qiufang (female), Han Yumin (female), Cheng Guoping, Tong Xiangling, Xie Bingxin (female), Xie Xiangyun (female), Xie Qunlu, Xiao Wenyan (female), Yi Shijuan (female), Cai Zuquan, Cai Zuiang (female), Tan Qixiang, Miao Liya (female), Fan Liming, Pan Meixian (female), Dai Zuomin, Dai Jinrong	181	
1978	5th	Ding Jinguo, Ding Shi'e, Ding Deguan, Yu Guangyuan, Ma Chungu, Wang Zhijiang, Wang Ziye, Wang Wenjuan, Wang Yugui, Wang Yinglai, Wang Guoying, Wang Zhan, Wang Juanhua, Che Wenyi, Mao Xingzhen, Ba Jin, Deng Liqun, Zuo Ying, Zuo Shudong, Shi Lin, Shi Zhongqin, Lu Yudao, Shi Liang, Situ Han, Ji Changshan, Lü Shuxiang, Lü Hua, Zhu Erpei, Zhu Jinda, Zhu Heng, Ren Guoquan, Ren Jiyu, Ren Xinmin, Zhuang Shifu, Liu Danian, Liu Fonian, Liu Bingyan, Liu Jin, Liu Nianzhi, Guan Jian, Sun Daguang, Sun Longgen, Sun Jingen, Sun Yinquan, Yan Youmin, Su Buqing, Su Zhenhua, Du Yuming, Du Dihua, Li Yaozhang, Li Zhi Xia, Li Guohao, Li Chang, Li Chunfu, Li Bingshu, Li Xianglin, Li Ruifu, Li Furong, Li Qiang, Yang Xinpei, Yang Min, Yang You, Wu Zuoren, Wu Lengxi, Wu Asi, Wu Ruoan, Wu Miaoqiang, Wu Zhaoguang, Wu Yaozong, Qiu Bohong, Ying Zhongfa, Wang You, Sha Qianli, Shen Xiaomei, Shen Guozhen, Shen Yuerui, Shen Taosheng, Shen Hong, Song Qingling, Song Yangchu, Chi Shangbin, Zhang Wenyu, Zhang Wentao, Zhang Handong, Zhang Guangnian, Zhang Guojun, Zhang Xianchong, Zhang Pinfang, Zhang Xiangtong, Zhang Meifang, Zhang Junxiang, Zhang Yan, Lu Guoping, Lu Guoliang, Lu Huangen, Lu Xinxiang, Chen Yuande, Chen Yun, Chen Zhongwei, Chen Zhifang, Chen BomingChen Jinshui, Chen Nianyi, Chen Zude, Chen Xianglin, Chen Peisen, Chen Zhi, Chen Cuixia, Shao Rongbin, Tai Chunfu, Lin Zongtang, Lin Huiqing, Yu Yongkang, Yu Leidi, Yue Meizhong, Jin Quanfu, Zhou Yue'e, Zhou Chuanjia, Zhou Gucheng, Zhou Nianbang, Zhou Haiying, Zhou Shu, Zhou Jihong, Fang Mingshan, Zhao Xingzhi, Zhao Xinghua, Zhao Zhiming, Zhao Zhongyao, Zhao Zukang, Zhao Chaogou, Rong Yiren, Hu Guoliang, Hu Sheng, Hu Juewen, Shu Jigang, Shi Ruwei, Shi Ruzhang, Jiang Chunhua, Zhu Gongjian, Yao Yonggen, Yao Fangping, Qin Chengsen, Yuan Wei Min, Yuan Xuefen, Xia Yushu, Gu Ming, Gu Zhongxiao, Gu Baosheng, Gu Shunxian, Qian Baojun, Qian Xinzong, Qian Chenghai, Ni Guyin, Xu Yimin, Aisin-Gioro Pujie, Ling Yun, Ling Zhenfang, Gao Runhua, Guo Wantang, Tang Yingbin, Tang Tao, Tao Yongchao, Huang Yong'an, Huang Weichen, Cao Zhifen, Peng Chong, Ge Yamin, Dong Keli, Dong Chenglang, Jiang Lansun, Jiang Xiazhen, Han Zheyi, Han Suihua, Fu Peibin, Xie Tieli, Pu Yunkai, Lei Xinghan, Lu Jinmei, Yi Shijuan, Pei Xianbai, Tan Qixiang, Miao Xiantao, Dai Xingqing, Wei Zhongren	184	
1983	6th	Wang Yinglai, Wang Jinda, Wang Jiankang, Wang Juanhua, Wang Lei, Bei Hanting, Lu Yudao, Bao Yueshun, Zhu Zhengxian, Zhu Erpei, Zhu Xuefan, Zhu Heng, Ren Xinmin, Xiang Dawei, Liu Fonian, Liu Nianzhi, Liu Jingji, Jiang Jianren, Ruan Chongwu, Sun Meiying, Su Buqing, Li Liangyuan, Li Jianguo, Li Yiqun, Li Ruifu, Li Furong, Yang Xincai, Yang You, Wu Zuoren, Wu Ruoan, Wu Zhaoguang, He Baoguang, Yu Chengzhou, Gu Chaohao, Ying Zhongfa, Wang Wanli, Wang Daohan, Wang You, Shen Minkang, Zhang Longxiang, Zhang Zhongli Zhang Guomin, Zhang Xiangtong, Zhang Junxiang, Zhang Yan, Chen Zhihang, Chen Zude, Chen Zhi, Lin Jiamei, Yu Leidi, Zhou Gucheng, Zhou Miaoyu, Zhou Nianbang, Zhou Haiying, Zhou Shu, Zheng Linsun, Guan Bao, Zhao Zhongyao, Zhao Zukang, Rong Yiren, Hu Lijiao, Hu Naiqiu, Hu Guiqing, Hu Juewen, Pang Shuchun, Zhu Jiaming, Qin Baoxing, Yuan Xuefen, Qian Xinzong, Qian Duansheng, Qian Chenghai, Yin Guofang, Gao Longzhang, Gao Runhua, Cao Wenying, Jiang Lansun, Han Zheyi, Cheng Xiaowu, Fu Peibin, Yi Shijuan, Cai Xiuling, Pan Qihuai	82	
1988	7th	Ding Wei, Ma Guining, Wang Zhipei, Wang Peizhou, Wang Zhigang, Wang Zhenyi, Wang Jian, Yin Hao, Ye Gongqi, Ye Shuhua, Shi Meili, Bai Tongshuo, Zhu Xuefan, Zhu Rongji, Qiao Shi, Ren Wenyan, Liu Nianzhi, Jiang Yaofei, Sun Meiying, Yan Yixun, Su Buqing, Wu Dakun, Wu Jieping, Wu Chenghui, Wu Yigong, Wu Zhaoguang, Wu Huifang, Gu Chaohao, Wang Pinxian, Shen Minkang, Song Zaier, Zhang Yuanzhen, Zhang Youjun, Zhang Zhongli, Zhang Min, Zhang Suodi, Zhang Yan, Chen Shijie, Chen Songying, Chen Bingsheng, Chen Zude, Chen Xianglin, Chen Deming, Zhou Gucheng, Zhou Haiying, Zheng Weian, Zheng Linsun, Feng Fuhai, Zhao Fusan, Zhao Zukang, Rong Yiren, Hu Guiqing, Ha Baoxin, Zhu Jiaming, Qin Baoxing, Yuan Xuefen, Qian Bocheng, Xu Mingguan, Xu Peng, Yin Guofang, Gao Runhua, Guo Xiuzhen, Zhu Junjing, Huang Qizhou, Mei Shouchun, Sui Xinhui, Dong Yinchu, Cheng Bushi, Cheng Xiaowu, Lu Yinjuan, Bao Haoxian, Cai Yana	72	
1993	8th	Ding Wei, Gan Zhijian, Ma Guining, Wang Naili, Wang Zhipei, Wang Tianduo, Wang Peizhou, Wang Peisheng, You Chaoqun, Ye Gongqi, Ye Shuhua, Bai Tongshuo, Zhu Zhihao, Liu Jinbao, Jiang Zemin, Jiang Jianzhong, Sun Tingfang, Yan Yixun, Li Daqian, Li Minlu, Li Kuinan, Wu Dakun, Wu Xiaozhong, Wu Bangguo, Wu Jieping, Wu Zhaoguang, He Jingzhi, Wang Yunzhang, Shen Jinkang, Shen Xiaoliang, Zhang Yuanzhen, Zhang Youjun, Zhang Lansheng, Zhang Zhongli, Zhang Ding Hong, Zhang Zhenyi, Zhang Min, Zhang Suodi, Zhang Yan, Chen Bingsheng, Chen Zude, Shao Xueming, Lin Yueying, Lin Shuqiong, Luo Daming, Zhao Qizheng, Rong Yiren, Hu Guiqing, Ha Baoxin, Hou Ziqiang, Luo Zhaotian, Qin Baoxing, Yuan Xuefen, Xia Liqing, Xu Renhui, Xu Zhiyi, Xu Peng, Gao Wenkui, Guo Jianhua, Guo Nanlin, Zhu Junjing, Huang Guancong, Huang Ju, Cao Guochen, Hui Yongzheng, Tong Hongmou, Cai Fuzhong, Xue Minglun, Xue Muxuan, Wei Guangai	70	
1998	9th	Yu Jianmin, Wan Guosen, Ma Guining, Wang Xiaomo, Wang Zhipei, Wang Wuding, Wang Hongying, Shi Liwen, Ye Shuhua, Tian Dingyu, Bai Tongshuo (Manchu), Zhu Shiming, Zhu Kaixuan, Zhu Lilan, Zhu Mingde, Wu Lulu, Liu Lunxian, Liu Yuyang, Jiang Zemin, Jiang Jianzhong, Tang Zhangcheng, Xu Shiyuan, Xu Zuxiong, Sun Guizhang, Yan Yixun, Su Peiji, Li Daqian, Li Mingyu, Li Jinsheng, Li Shuzheng, Li Kuinan, Yang Qiqing (Hui), Wu Jieping, Wu Sheng Lei, Wu Nianzu, Wu Lili, He Shanquan, He Jingzhi, Xin Jude, Zhang Youjun, Zhang Lansheng, Zhang Zhongli, Chen Liling, Chen Zuoyi, Chen Guifen, Chen Tedi, Chen Xianglin, Shao Zhen, Fan Deguan, Zhou Zhishi, Zhou Jiachun, Zheng Jianling, Zhao Jiagao, Hu Wei, Zhu Junyi, Xia Keqiang, Xia Xiurong, Xu Kuangdi, Xu Qihua, Gao Lulin, Guo Jianhua, Huang Qifan, Huang Ju, Dong Haolin, Han Zhubin, Hui Yongzheng, Xue Quanrong, Xue Minglun, Wei Guangai (Hui nationality)	69	
2003	10th	Yu Jianmin (female), Wang Wuding, Wang Guanchang, Wang Jiafen (female), Wang Enduo (female), Yin Jizuo, Ai Baojun, Li Wuwei, Lu Jinping, Ye Qian (female), Shi Yibing, Bai Tongshuo (Manchu), Ji Peiding, Zhu Shiming, Wu Lulu (female), Jiang Zemin, Jiang Jianzhong, Sun Yunshi, Yan Yixun, Li Daqian, Li Mingyu (female), Li Jinsheng, Li Dingguo, Li Kuinan (female), Li Furong, Yang Qiqing (Hui), Ying Minghong, Zhang Linjian, Zhang Chonghua, Zhang Zheren, Chen Xu, Chen Liangyu Chen Hong, Chen Tedi (female), Chen Saijuan (female), Fan Bingxun, Jin Binghua, Zhou Wenyu (female), Zhou Hongling (female), Zheng Chengsi, Zheng Huiqiang, Zhao Xiaoding, Hu Pingxi, Yu Guosheng, Zhu Junyi, Yao Li (female), Yuan Yixing, Xi Meijuan (female), Gao Xiaomei (female), Guo Guangchang, Huang Ju, Huang Furong, Gong Xueping, Peng Zhenqiu, Dong Haolin, Han Zheng, Hui Yongzheng, Cheng Jingping (female), Chu Yilin (female), Chu Junhao, Cai Dafeng, Cai Hongsheng, Fan Shuiyu (female), Qu Jun	64	
2008	11th	Xi Jinping, Ma Lan (female), Ma Dexiu (female), Wang Ronghua, Wang Zhan, Wang Enduo (female), Wang Xia (female, Mongolian), Ye Qian (female), Ye Huixian, Rong Guangdao, Lü Yachen, Zhu Yucheng (Manchu), Zhu Zhiyuan, Zhu Guoping (female), Zhu Xueqin (female), Liu Yungeng, Liu Hongkai, Sun Yibiao, Yan Chengzhong, Yan Junqi (female), Du Bin, Li Yiping, Li Bin, Wu Qidi (female), Wu Zhongze, Wu Qiang, Ying Minghong, Ying Yong, Shen Zhigang, Zhang Quan, Zhang Zhaoan Zhang Zheren, Chen Xuyuan, Chen Weilan (female), Chen Xu, Chen Hong, Chen Zhenlou, Chen Saijuan (female), Shao Zhiqing, Lin Yinmao (female), Jin Changrong (Hui nationality), Jin Xingming, Jin Jianzhong, Jin Binghua, Zhou Hongling (female), Zheng Jie, Hu Pingxi, Yu Zhengsheng, Hong Hao, Yao Mingbao, Yao Li (female), Qin Shaode, Jia Weiping (female), Gu Jin, Gu Yidong, Xu Zheng, Xi Meijuan (female), Guo Guangchang, Huang Yuejin, Gong Xueping, Sheng Yafei, Han Zheng, Chu Junhao, Fan Yun (female)	64	
2013	12th	Xi Jinping, Ma Lan (female), Ma Xulun, Wang Naikun (female), Wang Junjin, Wang Zhan, Wang Xia (female, Mongolian), ~~Feng Jun~~, Feng Ying (female), Zhu Zhiwen, Zhu Zhiyuan, Zhu Guoping (female), Zhu Xueqin (female), Liu Weiguo, Xu Luode, Sun Xianzong, Sun Yueming, Hua Bei (female, Hui), Yan Chengzong, Li Yang, Li Lin, Li Bin, Li Biying (female), Yang Maijun (Bai), Yang Xiong, He Wenbo (Manchu), Ying Yong, Shen Zhi Gang, Zhang Quan, Zhang Zhaoan, Zhang Weihua, Chen Xuyuan, Chen Xu, Chen Hesheng, Chen Zhenlou, Chen Jingying (female), Shao Zhiqing, Lin Yinmao (female), Jin Donghan, Jin Feng, Zhou Zhenbo, Shi Chao, Yao Haitong, Jia Weiping (female), Gu Jin, Gu Yidong, Xu Xiaoping, Xu Lin, Yin Yicui (female), Xi Meijuan (female), Huang Dinan, Cao Kefan, Sheng Yafei, Ge Junjie, Han Zheng, Qian Fangli (female), Liao Changyong, Fan Yun (female), Wei Youjiang		
2018	13th	Ding Guanghong, Ding Zhongli, Ma Lan (female), Wang Wei (female), Wang Xia (female, Mongolian), Wang Anyi (female), Wang Xiufeng, Wang Jianyu, Wang Junfeng, Zhu Zhisong, Zhu Guoping (female), Zhu Jiandi, Liu Yan (female), Liu Xiaobing, Liu Xiaoyun, Liu Xinhua (Hui), Tang Liang, Xu Lirong, Xu Ningsheng, Shou Ziqi, Hua Bei (female, Hui), Li Feng, Li Lin, Li Bin, Li Qiang, Wu Guanghui, Ying Yong, Shen Biao, Shen Chunyao Song Yuanjun, ~~Zhang Bencai~~, Zhang Zhaoan, Chen Li, Chen Hong, Chen Jing, Chen Guomin, Chen Mingbo, Chen Jingying (female), Shao Zhiqing, Hang Yingwei, Gao Yun, Jin Feng, Zhou Yanfang (female), Gu Jun, Chai Shanshan, Xu Zheng, Xu Rujun, Xu Juehui (female), Yin Yicui (female), Tang Hailong, Huang Dinan, Cao Kefan, Cao Liqiang, Zhang Weimin, Dong Chuanjie, Liao Guoxun (Tujia ethnic group), Liao Changyong, Fan Yun (female), Pan Xiangli (female)	59	
2023	14th	Ding Kuiling, Wang Zhijiang, Wang Ruihe, Shui Qingxia, Tian Xuan, Shi Yaobin, Yin Jie, Yin Hairong, Quan Heng, Shi Yancai, Zhu Liping, Zhu Jiandi, Liu Duo, Liu Yunzhi, Liu Yiyan, Tang Liang, Xu Zhong, Xu Baoyun, Li Feng, Li Jun, Li Yangzhe, Li Haiyong, Yang Yong, Wu Yirong, Wu Wei, Wu Huangan, Zhang Wei, Zhang Fan, Zhang Yimin, Zhang Suxin, Chen Da, Chen Yong, Chen Jining, Chen Zhongyi, Qi Shi, Fan Xianqun, Hang Yingwei, Jin Li, Jin Penghui, Zhou Tongyu, Zhou Xinmin, Zhou Yanfang, Shan Weixiang, Zhao Jincai, Yao Zhuoyun, Yuan Guohua, Jia Yu, Gu Jun, Gu Xianglin, Ni Di, Huang Yongping, Mei Bing, Gong Zheng, Gong Xingao, Sheng Hong, Jiang Zhuoqing, Cheng Xueyuan, Xie Jiangang, Lou Xiangping, Fan Yun, Huang Lixin	61	
