= Chongqing Municipal Committee of the Chinese People's Political Consultative Conference =

Municipal Advisory body in Chongqing, China

Chongqing Municipal Committee of the Chinese People's Political Consultative Conference 中国人民政治协商会议重庆市委员会
- 13th
- Emblem of the Chinese People's Political Consultative Conference

Type
- Type: United front organ Constitutional convention (Historical); Legislature (Historical) of Chinese People's Political Consultative Conference

History
- Founded: June 1997; 29 years ago
- Preceded by: Chongqing Municipal People's Congress Consultative Committee

Leadership
- Chairperson: Cheng Lihua

Website
- www.cqzx.gov.cn

Chinese name
- Simplified Chinese: 中国人民政治协商会议重庆市委员会
- Traditional Chinese: 中國人民政治協商會議重慶市委員會
Transcriptions
Standard Mandarin
- Hanyu Pinyin: Zhōngguó Rénmín Zhèngzhì Xiéshāng Huìyì Choóngqìngshì Wěiyuánhuì

Abbreviation
- Simplified Chinese: 重庆市政协
- Traditional Chinese: 重庆市政協
- Literal meaning: CPPCC Chongqing Municipal Committee
Transcriptions
Standard Mandarin
- Hanyu Pinyin: Choóngqìngshì Zhèngxié

The Chongqing Municipal Committee of the Chinese People's Political Consultative Conference (Chinese: 中国人民政治协商会议重庆市委员会) is the advisory body and a local organization of the Chinese People's Political Consultative Conference in Chongqing, China. it is supervised and directed by the Chongqing Municipal Committee of the Chinese Communist Party.

== History ==
The Chongqing Municipal Committee of the Chinese People's Political Consultative Conference was founded in June 1997 while Chongqing was upgraded to a direct-administered municipality.

=== Anti-corruption campaign ===
On 23 March 2024, vice chairperson Li Yuefeng was put under investigation for alleged "serious duty-related malfeasance" by the Central Commission for Discipline Inspection (CCDI), the party's internal disciplinary body, and the National Supervisory Commission, the highest anti-corruption agency of China.

== Term ==
=== 1st ===
- Term: June 1997 – January 2003
- Chairperson: Zhang Wenbin
- Vice Chairpersons: Huang Lipei, Wei Siqi, Li Bing, Dou Ruihua, Wang Shihui ( –2000), Xu Zongjun, Zhang Zhonghui, Liu Huijun, Zhang Guozhong, Liu Zhizhong (January 2002–), Gu Wenxing (January 2000–), Li Ming (January 2000–), Chen Bangguo (January 2002–)

=== 2nd ===
- Term: January 2003 – January 2008
- Chairperson: Liu Zhizhong
- Vice Chairpersons: Chen Bangguo, Li Bing, Xu Zhongmin (–2006), Dou Ruihua, Huang Lipei, Gu Wenxing, Li Ming, Xia Peidu, Wang Xiaoqun, Yin Mingshan, Xing Yuanmin (January 2007–), Chen Wanzhi (January 2007–)

=== 3rd ===
- Term: January 2008 – January 2013
- Chairperson: Xing Yuanmin
- Vice Chairpersons: Wu Jianong, Liu Longzhu, Xia Peidu, Wang Xiaoqun, Chen Wanzhi, Yu Xuexin, Peng Yonghui, Chen Jingqiu, Sun Shenlin, He Shizhong (January 2012–), Xie Xiaojun (January 2011–), Yang Tianyi (January 2011–), Chen Guiyun (January 2011–)
- Secretary-General: Wang Changshou

=== 4th ===
- Term: January 2013 – January 2018
- Chairperson: Xu Jingye
- Vice Chairpersons: He Shizhong, Tong Xiaoping, Xie Xiaojun, Peng Yonghui, Yang Tianyi, Chen Guiyun, Jiang Ping, Li Yuefeng, Zhang Ling, Liu Guanglei (January 2015–), Zhou Keqin (January 2016–), Yan Ping (January 2017–), Wu Gang (January 2017–), Li Jianchun (January 2017–)
- Secretary-General: Xie Yiya

=== 5th ===
- Term: January 2018 – January 2023
- Chairperson: Wang Jiong
- Vice Chairpersons: Song Airong, Chen Guiyun, Wu Gang, Tan Jialing, Zhang Ling, Zhou Keqin (–January 2021), Xu Daiyin, Wang Xinqiang, Qu Qian (January 2020–), Zhou Yong (January 2021–), Li Jing (January 2022–), Duan Chenggang (January 2022–)
- Secretary-General: Qin Min

=== 6th ===
- Term: January 2023 – 2028
- Chairperson: Tang Fangyu (–October 2023) → Cheng Lihua (January 2024–)
- Vice Chairpersons: Li Jing, Chen Guiyun, Tan Jialing, Wang Xinqiang, Duan Chenggang (–March 2025), Zhou Yong, Ding Shiyong, Du Huiping, Wang Yu
- Secretary-General: Qin Min (–December 2024), Lan Qinghua (–August 2025)
