= Peng Jinhui =

Chinese engineer, administrator and politician

- 彭金辉

Head of Organization Department of the CPC Chongqing Committee
- In office 9 December 2020 – 23 May 2022
- Preceded by: Hu Wenrong
- Succeeded by: Cai Yunge

Head of Organization Department of the CPC Hainan Committee
- In office October 2018 – December 2020
- Preceded by: Wang Ruilian
- Succeeded by: Xu Qifang

President of Kunming University of Science and Technology
- In office February 2016 – January 2018
- Preceded by: Zhang Yingjie
- Succeeded by: Wang Xueqin

President of Yunnan Minzu University
- In office September 2013 – February 2016
- Preceded by: Zhen Chaodang
- Succeeded by: Na Jinhua

Personal details
- Born: December 1964 (age 61) Jingdong Yi Autonomous County, Yunnan, China
- Party: Chinese Communist Party
- Education: Kunming University of Science and Technology; Karlsruhe Institute of Technology; Brunel University London
- Occupation: Engineer, administrator, politician
- Scientific career
- Fields: Metallurgy

Chinese name
- Traditional Chinese: 彭金輝
- Simplified Chinese: 彭金辉
Transcriptions
Standard Mandarin
- Hanyu Pinyin: Péng Jīnhuī

Peng Jinhui (Chinese: 彭金辉; born December 1964) is a Chinese engineer, administrator and politician currently serving as a deputy head of the Organization Department of the Chinese Communist Party. Previously, he served as heads of the Organization Department of both the Hainan and Chongqing Committees of the CCP. He was president of Yunnan Minzu University between 2013 and 2016 and president of Kunming University of Science and Technology between 2016 and 2018. He is of Yi ethnicity. He is an alternate member of the 19th Central Committee of the CCP.

== Biography ==
Peng was born in Jingdong Yi Autonomous County, Yunnan, in December 1964. He received his M.S. and a PhD degree in metallurgy from Kunming University of Science and Technology. After graduating, he taught at the university. He joined the Chinese Communist Party in July 1989. He carried out postdoctoral research at Karlsruhe Institute of Technology from 1994 to 1996 and Brunel University London from 1999 to 2000. His career transitioned from research to administration when he was appointed as vice-president of Kunming University of Science and Technology in January 2014. In September 2013 he was promoted again to become president of Yunnan Minzu University. In February 2016, he was transferred back to Kunming University of Science and Technology and appointed the president.

He began his political career in 2018, when he was appointed vice-governor of Hainan in January. He concurrently served as CCP Committee Secretary of Yangpu Economic Development Zone. In October 2018 he succeeded Wang Ruilian as head of Organization Department of the CCP Hainan Committee. On December 9, 2020, he was transferred to Chongqing and appointed head of Organization Department of the CCP Chongqing Committee, replacing Hu Wenrong.

== Honours and awards ==
- November 2017 Member of the Chinese Academy of Engineering (CAE)

Educational offices
Preceded by Zhen Chaodang (甄朝党)	President of Yunnan Minzu University; 2013–2016	Succeeded by Na Jinhua (那金华)
Preceded by Zhang Yingjie (张英杰)	President of Kunming University of Science and Technology; 2016–2018	Succeeded by Wang Xueqin (王学勤)
Party political offices
Preceded by Wang Ruilian	Head of Organization Department of the CPC Hainan Committee; 2018–2020	Succeeded by TBA
Preceded by Hu Wenrong	Head of Organization Department of the CPC Chongqing Committee; 2020	Incumbent
