= Ren Wei =

Ren Wei may refer to:

- Ren Wei (racing driver) (born 1983)
- Ren Wei (footballer) (born 1997)
- Ren Wei (politician), Standing Committee of the Tibet Autonomous Regional Committee of the Chinese Communist Party and Executive Vice-Chairman of the People's Government of the Tibet Autonomous Region.
- Wei Ren, professor and electrical engineer at the University of California, Riverside
