= Yin Yicui =

Chinese politician

- 殷一璀
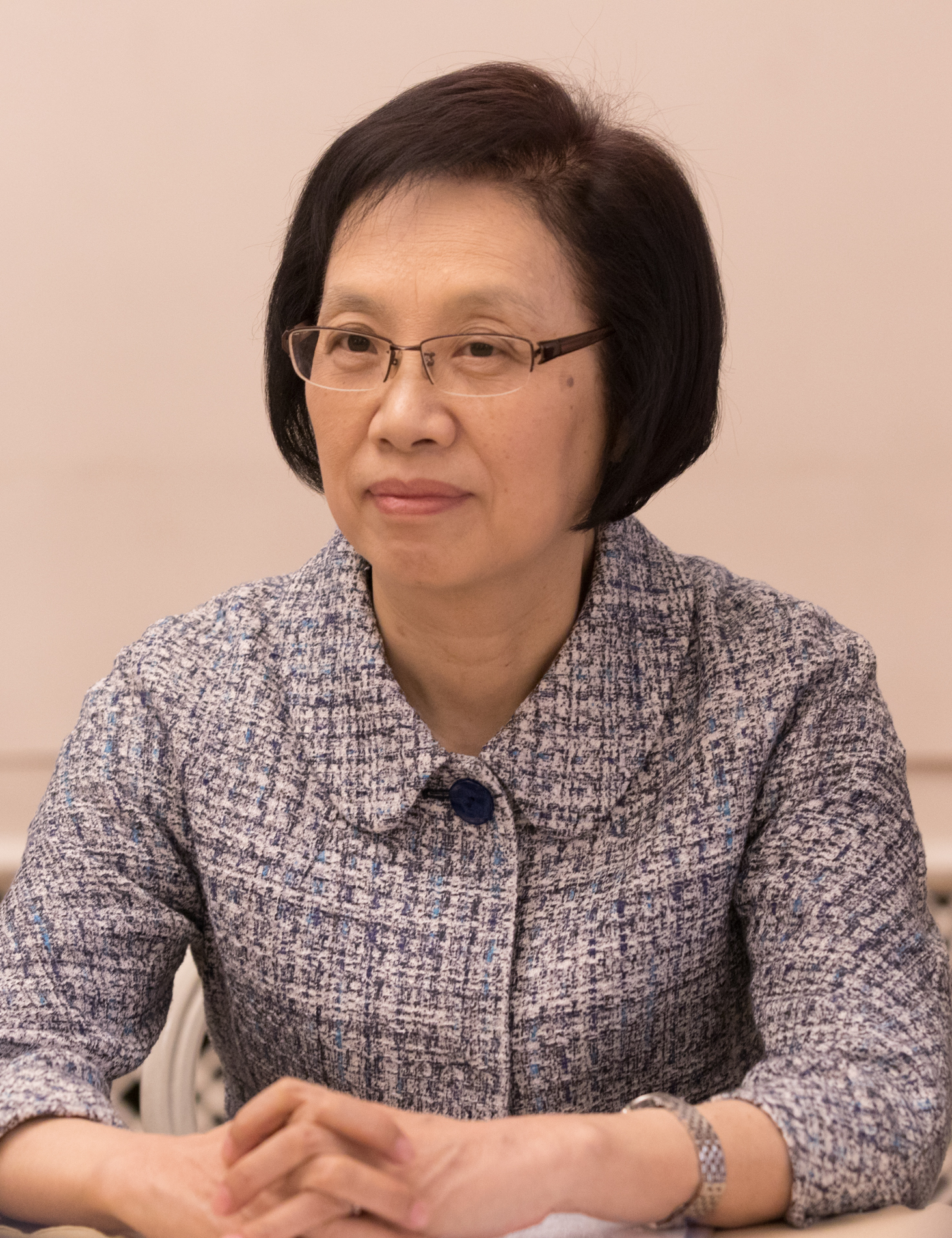
- Yin in 2017

Chairwoman of the Shanghai Municipal People's Congress
- In office February 2013 – January 2020
- Preceded by: Liu Yungeng
- Succeeded by: Jiang Zhuoqing

Personal details
- Born: January 1955 (age 71) Cangnan, Zhejiang, China
- Party: Chinese Communist Party
- Education: East China Normal University

Yin Yicui (Chinese: 殷一璀; pinyin: Yīn Yīcuǐ; born January 1955) is a Chinese Communist Party politician who previously served as the Chairwoman of the Shanghai People's Congress from 2013 to 2020.

== Career ==
Yin was born in Cangnan County, Zhejiang province. She began her career as a teenager in a food processing factory in Jing'an District, where she joined the Communist Youth League. Yin is a graduate of East China Normal University, where she received her bachelor's degree in 1982 and master's degree in 1995. After graduating she stayed at the school to be a political instructor and lecturer.

In 1992 she was named deputy governor of Jing'an District, then in 1994 she was appointed deputy head of the municipal office of education and health (department-level). She entered government in 1997, then rose to the municipal Party Standing Committee in 1997, then head of propaganda in Shanghai in 2000. In May 2000 she became the Deputy Communist Party Secretary of Shanghai; she spent over a decade in the position. Finally she was promoted to Chair of the Shanghai Municipal People's Congress in April 2013. She was succeeded in her deputy party chief post by Li Xi.

Party political offices
Preceded by Jin Binghua	Head of Publicity Department of Shanghai Municipal Committee of the Chinese Communist Party; 2000–2002	Succeeded by Wang Zhongwei
Preceded by Wang Anshun	Deputy Communist Party of Shanghai; 2002–2013	Succeeded by Li Xi
Assembly seats
Preceded by Liu Yungeng	Chairperson of the Shanghai People's Congress; 2013–2020	Succeeded by Jiang Zhuoqing
