= Liu Shihe =

Chinese politician (born 1955)

- 刘士合

Chairman of Dongying People's Congress
- In office January 2014 – February 2017
- Preceded by: Jiang Jie
- Succeeded by: Shen Changyou

Communist Party Secretary of Dongying
- In office July 2013 – January 2015
- Preceded by: Jiang Jie
- Succeeded by: Shen Changyou

Chairman of Laiwu People's Congress
- In office December 2011 – July 2013
- Preceded by: Yu Jiancheng
- Succeeded by: Wang Liang

Communist Party Secretary of Laiwu
- In office December 2011 – July 2013
- Preceded by: Yu Jiancheng
- Succeeded by: Wang Liang

Mayor of Heze
- In office July 2008 – December 2011
- Preceded by: Zhao Runtian
- Succeeded by: Sun Aijun

Personal details
- Born: February 1955 (age 71) Zhanhua County, Shandong, China
- Party: Chinese Communist Party (1980–2018; expelled)
- Education: Binzhou Normal College; Central Party School of the Chinese Communist Party

Chinese name
- Simplified Chinese: 刘士合
- Traditional Chinese: 劉士 合
Transcriptions
Standard Mandarin
- Hanyu Pinyin: Liú Shìhé

Liu Shihe (Chinese: 刘士合; born February 1955) is a former Chinese politician who spent his entire career in north China's Shandong province. He was investigated by China's top anti-graft agency in June 2018. Previously he served as chairman of the Financial and Economic Committee of the Shandong People's Congress.

== Biography ==
Liu was born in Zhanhua County (now Zhanhua District of Binzhou), Shandong, in February 1955. After a short period of teaching primary school students in a village, he was admitted to Beizhen Normal School (now Binzhou Normal College) in September 1973. After graduating, he taught at Zhanhua County No. 5 High School and then Zhanhua County No. 1 High School.

Liu joined the Chinese Communist Party (CCP) in December 1980, and got involved in politics in November 1986, when he was appointed deputy director of Zhanhua County Culture and Education Bureau. In March 1989, he became party secretary and leader of Qiqu Township and moved back to Zhanhua County as director of General Office in February 1992. He rose to become magistrate in March 1995. In December 1997, he became deputy party secretary of Zouping County, a county-level city under the jurisdiction of Binzhou, and concurrently holding the magistrate position. In April 2001, he was elevated to party secretary, the top political position in the county, and one month later concurrently serving as chairman of the People's Congress. In December 2005, he moved to Heze, where he was appointed executive vice mayor. He became deputy party secretary in March 2007, concurrently serving as mayor since July 2008. He was transferred to Laiwu and appointed party secretary, chairman of People's Congress, and president of Party School in December 2011 before being assigned to the similar position in the coastal city Dongying in July 2013. In February 2017, he was transferred to Jinan, capital of Shandong province, and appointed chairman of the Financial and Economic Committee of the Shandong People's Congress.

=== Downfall ===
On 20 June 2018, he was put under investigation for alleged "serious violations of discipline and laws" by the Central Commission for Discipline Inspection (CCDI), the CCP's internal disciplinary body, and the National Supervisory Commission, the highest anti-corruption agency of China. On December 14, he was expelled from the CCP.

On 3 January 2019, he was detained by the Supreme People's Procuratorate. In March, he was indicted on suspicion of accepting bribes. On April 9, his trial was held at the Intermediate People's Court in Tai'an, Shandong. According to the indictment, he used his various positions between 2001 and 2018 to help others in transfer of state-owned land use right, job adjustment, project bidding, policy and fund support and in return, he illegally accepted money and goods worth over 55.89 million yuan ($8.76 million), personally or through his family members. On September 10, he received a sentence of 15 years in prison and fine of 4 million yuan for taking bribes.

Government offices
Preceded by Zhao Runtian (赵润田)	Mayor of Heze; 2008–2011	Succeeded by Sun Aijun (孙爱军)
Party political offices
Preceded by Yu Jiancheng (于建成)	Communist Party Secretary of Laiwu; 2011–2013	Succeeded by Wang Liang (王良)
Preceded by Jiang Jie	Communist Party Secretary of Dongying; 2013–2015	Succeeded by Shen Changyou (申长友)
Assembly seats
Preceded by Yu Jiancheng (于建成)	Chairman of Laiwu People's Congress; 2011–2013	Succeeded by Wang Liang (王良)
Preceded by Jiang Jie (姜杰)	Chairman of Dongying People's Congress; 2014–2017	Succeeded by Shen Changyou (申长友)
