= List of administrative divisions of Tianjin =

Municipality of Tianjin
- Municipality
- Seat: Heping District

County level divisions
- Sub-provincial new areas: 1
- Districts: 15

Township level divisions
- Towns: 118
- Townships: 19
- Ethnic townships: 1
- Subdistricts: 106

Villages level divisions
- Communities: 1,646
- Administrative villages: 3,680

Tianjin is one of the four direct-controlled municipalities of the People's Republic of China, and is further divided into 16 districts.

In addition, the Tianjin Economic and Technological Development Area (TEDA) is not a formal level of administration, but nevertheless enjoys rights similar to a regular district.

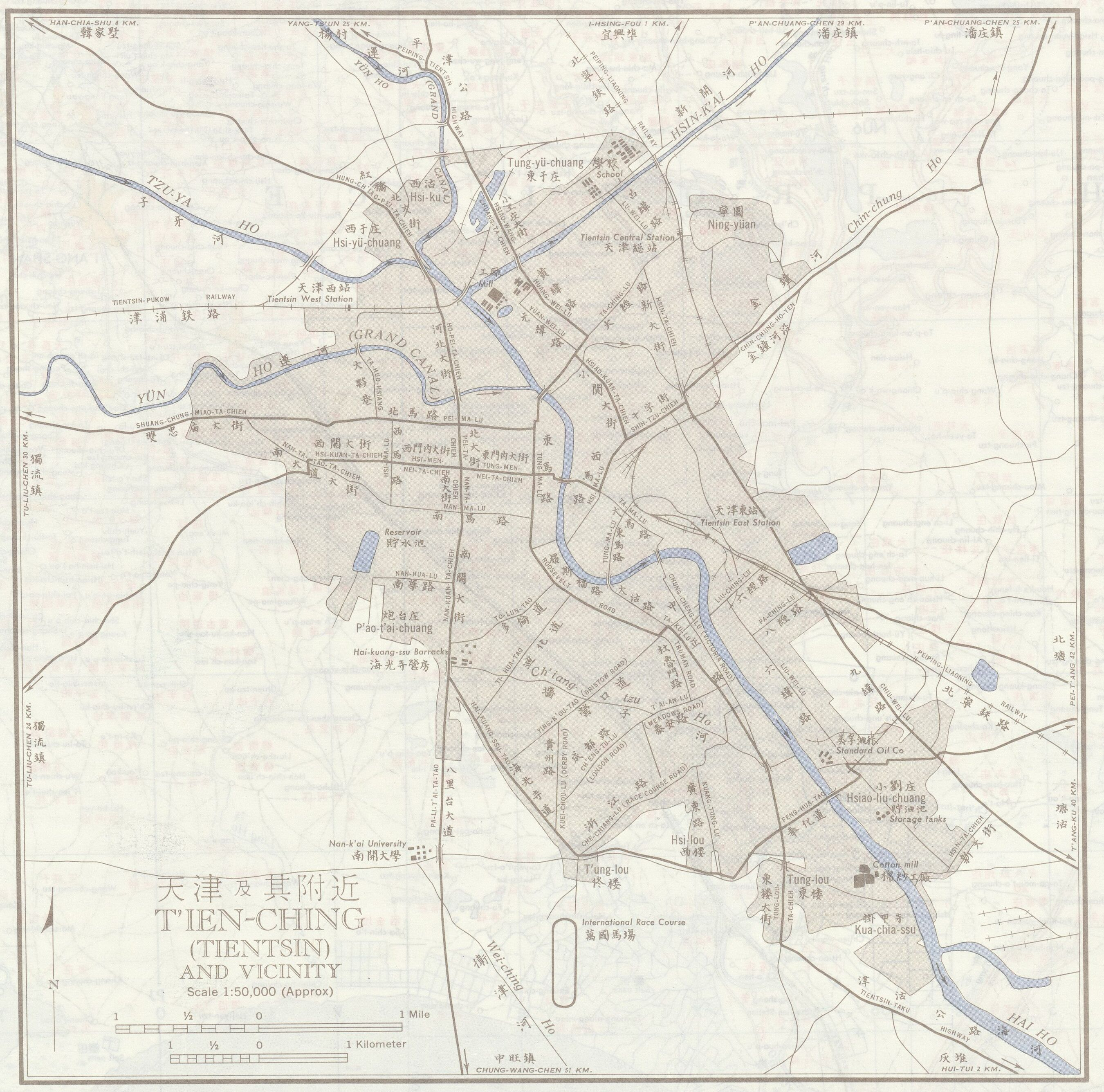
Map of Tianjin (labeled as T'IEN-CHING (TIENTSIN)) and vicinity (AMS, 1955)

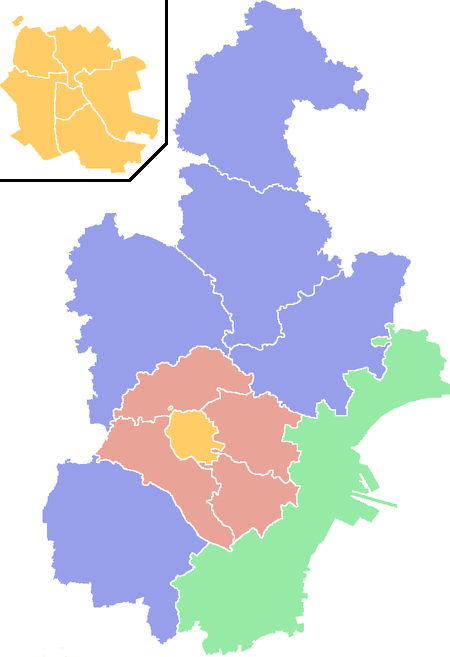

== Administrative divisions ==
All of these administrative divisions are explained in greater detail at Administrative divisions of the People's Republic of China. This chart lists only county-level divisions of Tianjin.

County Level							
Name	Chinese	Hanyu Pinyin	Division code		Area (km²)	Population (2010 census)	Density (/km²)
Heping District (City seat)	和平区	Hépíng Qū	120101	HPG	9.97	273,466	27,429
Hedong District	河东区	Hédōng Qū	120102	HDQ	39.00	860,852	22,073
Hexi District	河西区	Héxī Qū	120103	HXQ	41.24	870,632	21,111
Nankai District	南开区	Nánkāi Qū	120104	NKQ	40.64	1,018,196	25,054
Hebei District	河北区	Héběi Qū	120105	HBQ	29.14	788,368	27,054
Hongqiao District	红桥区	Hōngqiáo Qū	120106	HQO	21.30	531,526	24,954
Dongli District	东丽区	Dōnglì Qū	120110	DLI	460.00	569,955	1,239
Xiqing District	西青区	Xīqīng Qū	120111	XQG	545.00	684,690	1,256
Jinnan District	津南区	Jīnnán Qū	120112	JNQ	401.00	593,063	1,479
Beichen District	北辰区	Běichén Qū	120113	BCQ	478.00	669,031	1,400
Wuqing District	武清区	Wǔqīng Qū	120114	WQQ	1,570.00	949,413	605
Baodi District	宝坻区	Bǎodǐ Qū	120115	BDI	1,523.00	799,057	525
Binhai New Area	滨海新区	Bīnhǎi Xīnqū	120116	BHX	2,270.00	2,482,065	1,093
Ninghe District	宁河区	Nínghé Qū	120117	NIH	1,414.00	416,143	294
Jinghai District	静海区	Jìnghǎi Qū	120118	JHC	1,476.00	646,978	438
Jizhou District	蓟州区	Jìzhōu Qū	120119	JZI	1,590.00	784,789	494

== Recent changes in administrative divisions ==
Date	Before	After	Note	Reference
1973-07-07	parts of Hebei Province	Tianjin Municipality	provincial transferred	
1973-07-07	parts of Tianjin Prefecture	provincial-controlled	transferred	
1973-07-07	↳ Ninghe County	↳ Ninghe County	transferred	
1973-07-07	↳ Jinghai County	↳ Jinghai County	transferred	
1973-07-07	↳ Wuqing County	↳ Wuqing County	transferred	
1973-07-07	↳ Baodi County	↳ Baodi County	transferred	
1973-07-07	↳ Ji County	↳ Ji County	transferred	
1979-11-06	parts of Nanjiao District	Dagang District	established	
1992-02-12	Dongjiao District	Dongli District	renamed	Civil Affairs [1992]16
1992-02-12	Nanjiao District	Jinnan District	renamed	Civil Affairs [1992]16
1992-02-12	Xijiao District	Xiqing District	renamed	Civil Affairs [1992]16
1992-02-12	Beijiao District	Beichen District	renamed	Civil Affairs [1992]16
2000-06-13	Wuqing County	Wuqing District	reorganized	State Council [2000]67
2001-03-22	Baodi County	Baodi District	reorganized	State Council [2001]29
2009-10-21	Tanggu District	Binhai New Area	merged & established	State Council [2009]125
2009-10-21	Hangu District	Binhai New Area	merged & established	State Council [2009]125
2009-10-21	Dagang District	Binhai New Area	merged & established	State Council [2009]125
2015-07-23	Ninghe County	Ninghe District	reorganized	State Council [2015]119
2015-07-23	Jinghai County	Jinghai District	reorganized	State Council [2015]119
2016-06-08	Ji County	Jizhou District	reorganized	State Council [2016]98

== Historical divisions ==
=== ROC (1911–1949) ===
County / City	Present division
Tianjin City 天津市	Heping, Hexi, Hebei, Nankai, Hedong, Hongqiao
Tianjin County 天津縣	Jinnan, Dongli, Xiqing, Beichen
Wuqing County 武清縣	Wuqing
Baodi County 寶坻縣	Baodi
Jinghai County 靜海縣	Jinghai, Binhai
Ninghe County 寧河縣	Ninghe, Binhai
Ji County 薊縣	Jizhou
