= Jiang Zhuoqing =

Chinese politician

- 蒋卓庆

Chairman of the Shanghai Municipal People's Congress
- In office January 20, 2020 – January 15, 2023
- Preceded by: Yin Yicui
- Succeeded by: Dong Yunhu

Personal details
- Born: August 1959 (age 67) Cixi, Zhejiang, China
- Party: Chinese Communist Party (since 1985)

Jiang Zhuoqing (Chinese: 蒋卓庆; pinyin: Jiǎng Zhuóqìng; born August 1959) is a Chinese politician who served as the chairperson of the Shanghai Municipal People's Congress from 2020 to 2023.

== Career ==
Jiang was born in Cixi, Zhejiang province. He began his career as a waiter of Xiangyang Restaurant in 1979, then he studied in Shanghai Business School in 1980. After graduating, he began to serve in Shanghai Finance Bureau, until he served as the deputy Director from 1994 to 2002.

In 2002, Jiang was appointed as the District Governor of Yangpu District. During this period, he established the first online interactive platform between the District Governor and residents in Shanghai. In 2006, Jiang was appointed as the Shanghai Director of Labor and Social Security Bureau, after Shanghai pension scandal. He also served as the Deputy secretary of Government of Shanghai since 2008 and the Director of Shanghai Finance Bureau since 2010.

In 2013, Jiang was appointed as the deputy Mayor of Shanghai. He also co-served as the director of Hongqiao Business Area since 2015.

In October 2016, Jiang was transferred to Jiangsu, and appointed as the Secretary of the Jiangsu Provincial Discipline Inspection Commission. He also co-served as the first Director of the Jiangsu Supervisory Commission.

In December 2019, Jiang was returned to Shanghai and began to serve as the Chinese Communist Party Committee Secretary of the Standing Committee of the Shanghai People's Congress. In January 2020, Jiang was promoted to the Chairperson of the Standing Committee of the Shanghai Municipal People's Congress.
