= Chongqing Municipal Committee of the Chinese Communist Party =

Chongqing Municipal Committee of the Chinese Communist Party 中国共产党重庆市委员会

Overview
- Type: Highest decision-making organ when Chongqing Municipal Congress is not in session.
- Elected by: Chongqing Municipal Congress
- Length of term: Five years
- Term limits: None
- First convocation: May 1949

Leadership
- Secretary: Yuan Jiajun
- Deputy Secretary: Hu Henghua (Mayor); Li Mingqing (Specifically-designated)
- Secretary-General: Chen Xinwu
- Executive organ: Standing Committee
- Inspection organ: Commission for Discipline Inspection

Meeting place
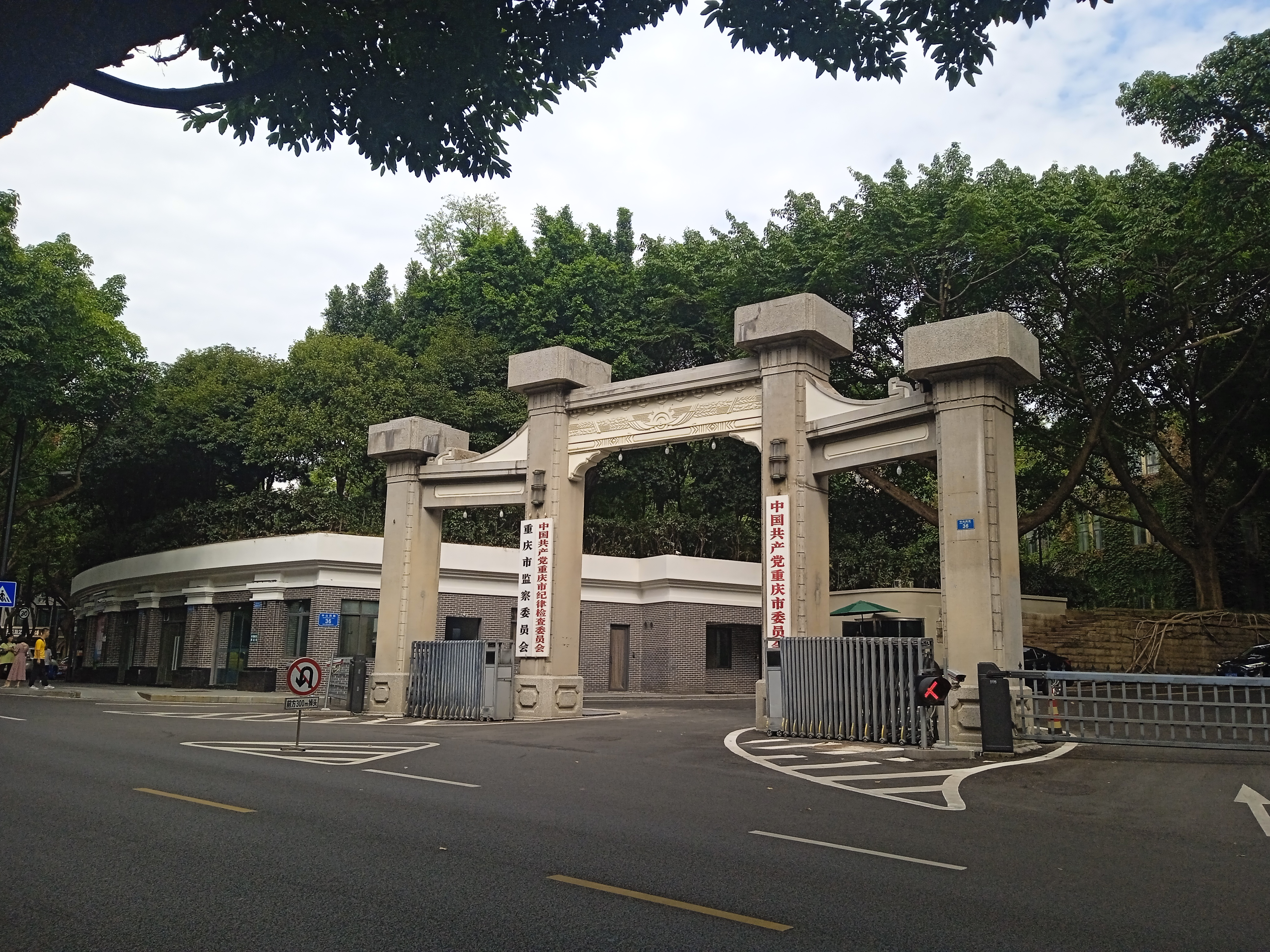
- 36 Zhongshan 4th Road, Yuzhong District, Chongqing

Chongqing Municipal Committee of the Chinese Communist Party
- Simplified Chinese: 中国共产党重庆市委员会
- Traditional Chinese: 中國共產黨重慶市委員會
Transcriptions
Standard Mandarin
- Hanyu Pinyin: Zhōngguó Gòngchǎndǎng Chóngqìngshì Wěiyuánhuì

Abbreviation
- Simplified Chinese: 中共重庆市委
- Traditional Chinese: 中共重慶市委
- Literal meaning: CCP Chongqing Municipal Committee
Transcriptions
Standard Mandarin
- Hanyu Pinyin: Zhōnggòng Chóngqìngshì Wěi

The Chongqing Municipal Committee of the Chinese Communist Party is the municipal committee of the Chinese Communist Party (CCP) in Chongqing. The CCP committee secretary is the highest ranking post in the municipality. The current secretary is Yuan Jiajun, a member of the CCP Politburo, who succeeded Chen Min'er on 8 December 2022.

== History ==
The Chongqing Municipal Committee was established in May 1949. In June 1997, after Chongqing was split from Sichuan to become a direct-administered municipality, Chongqing Municipal Committee became the municipality's highest administrative agency.

== Organization ==
The organization of the CCP Chongqing Municipal Committee includes:

- General Office

=== Functional Departments ===
- Organization Department
- Publicity Department
- United Front Work Department
- Political and Legal Affairs Commission

=== Offices ===
- Policy Research Office
- Office of the National Security Commission
- Office of the Cyberspace Affairs Commission
- Office of the Military-civilian Fusion Development Committee
- Taiwan Work Office
- Office of the Institutional Organization Commission
- Office of the Leading Group for Inspection Work
- Bureau of Veteran Cadres
- Municipal Archives Bureau

=== Dispatched institutions ===
- Working Committee of the Organs Directly Affiliated to the Chongqing Municipal Committee

=== Organizations directly under the Committee ===
- Chongqing Party School
- Chongqing Daily
- Chongqing Institute of Socialism
- Party History Research Office
- Chongqing Municipal Archives

== Leadership ==
The secretary of the committee is the highest office in Chongqing, being superior to the mayor of the city. Since at least 2007, the secretary has consistently been a member of the CCP Politburo.

=== Party Committees ===
5th Municipal Party Committee (May 2017–May 2022)

- Secretary: Sun Zhengcai (until 14 July 2017, put under investigation), Chen Min'er (from 15 July 2017)
- Deputy Secretaries: Zhang Guoqing (until December 2017), Tang Liangzhi (until December 2021), Ren Xuefeng (October 2018–October 2019, died), Wu Cunrong (from January 2021), Hu Henghua (from December 2021)
- Other Standing Committee members: Zhang Ming (from April 2022), Zeng Qinghong (until 15 September 2017), Chen Yong (until October 2018), Wang Xiangang (until January 2018), Liu Qiang, Chen Luping (until January 2018), Tao Changhai (until January 2018), Du Heping (until January 2018), Hu Wenrong (September 2017–December 2020), Li Jing (from December 2017), Han Zhikai (December 2017–February 2021), Wang Fu (January 2018–December 2021), Mo Gongming (from January 2018), Duan Chenggang (from October 2018), Mu Hongyu (November 2018–December 2021), Peng Jinhui, Gao Buming (from February 2021), Li Mingqing (from July 2021), Song Yijia (from March 2022), Chen Mingbo (from March 2022), Jiang Hui (from April 2022), Cai Yunge (from May 2022), Zhang Hongxing (from May 2022)

6th Municipal Party Committee (May 2022–)

- Secretary: Chen Min'er (until 8 December 2022), Yuan Jiajun (from 8 December 2022)
- Deputy Secretaries: Hu Henghua, Li Mingqing
- Other Standing Committee members: Lu Kehua, Song Yijia, Jiang Hui, Cai Yunge, Zhang Hongxing (died on 1 April 2023), Chen Mingbo, Yu Huiwen, Lu Hong, Luo Lin, Wang Yanqi (from October 2023), Chen Xinwu (from July 2023)

== See also ==
- Politics of Chongqing
