= Cheng Lihua =

Chinese politician

- 程丽华

Chairwoman of the Chongqing Municipal Committee of the Chinese People's Political Consultative Conference
- Incumbent
- Assumed office January 2024
- Preceded by: Tang Fangyu

Specifically-designated Deputy Communist Party Secretary of Anhui
- Incumbent
- Assumed office April 2021
- Party Secretary: Zheng Shanjie; Han Jun
- Preceded by: Xin Changxing

Personal details
- Born: April 1965 (age 61) Gushi County, Henan, China
- Party: Chinese Communist Party
- Education: Liaoning Finance And Trade College; Central Party School of the Chinese Communist Party

Chinese name
- Simplified Chinese: 程丽华
- Traditional Chinese: 程麗華
Transcriptions
Standard Mandarin
- Hanyu Pinyin: Chéng Lìhuá

Cheng Lihua (Chinese: 程丽华; born April 1965) is a Chinese politician who is the deputy party secretary of Anhui, in office since April 2021.

She was a representative of the 19th National Congress of the Chinese Communist Party and an alternate of the 19th Central Committee of the Chinese Communist Party. He is a member of the 20th Central Committee of the Chinese Communist Party.

== Biography ==
Cheng was born in Gushi County, Henan, in April 1965. In 1980, she was accepted to Liaoning Finance And Trade College, where she majored in industrial accounting.

After graduating in 1984, Cheng was assigned to Qinghai Provincial Department of Finance, where she was promoted to deputy head in December 2008 and to head in January 2009. She joined the Chinese Communist Party (CCP) in September 1987. She concurrently served as vice governor of Qinghai since January 2013.

In March 2017, Cheng was admitted to member of the Standing Committee of the CCP Tianjin Municipal Committee, the city's top authority. She became secretary of the Education Working Committee in the following month.

Cheng was transferred to Beijing and appointed vice minister of Finance in March 2018.

In April 2021, Cheng was deputy party secretary of Anhui, in addition to serving as president of the Party School.

In January 2024, Cheng became the chairwoman of the Chongqing Municipal Committee of the Chinese People's Political Consultative Conference.

Government offices
Preceded by Zhang Guangrong	Head of the Qinghai Provincial Department of Finance; 2009–2014	Succeeded by Dang Mingde
Party political offices
Preceded by Chen Zhemin	Secretary of the Education Working Committee of the CCP Tianjin Municipal Committee; 2017–2018	Succeeded by Yu Lijun
Preceded by Xin Changxing	Specifically-designated Deputy Communist Party Secretary of Anhui; 2021–2023	Succeeded by Yu Aihua
