= Dong Yunhu =

Chinese politician

- 董云虎

Chairman of the Shanghai Municipal People's Congress
- In office 15 January 2023 – 12 July 2023
- Preceded by: Jiang Zhuoqing
- Succeeded by: Huang Lixin

Chairman of the Shanghai Municipal Committee of the Chinese People's Political Consultative Conference
- In office 27 January 2018 – 15 January 2023
- Preceded by: Wu Zhiming
- Succeeded by: Hu Wenrong

Personal details
- Born: December 1962 (age 63) Xianju County, Zhejiang, China
- Party: Chinese Communist Party (1985–2023; expelled)
- Education: Hangzhou University; Nankai University

Chinese name
- Simplified Chinese: 董云虎
- Traditional Chinese: 董雲虎
Transcriptions
Standard Mandarin
- Hanyu Pinyin: Dǒng Yúnhǔ

Dong Yunhu (Chinese: 董云虎; born December 1962) is a former Chinese politician who served as chairman of the Shanghai Municipal People's Congress in 2023 and chairman of the Shanghai Municipal Committee of the Chinese People's Political Consultative Conference from 2018 to 2023. He joined the Chinese Communist Party (CCP) in April 1985, and entered the workforce in July 1986. As of July 2023 he was under investigation by China's top anti-corruption agency.

He was a representative of the 15th, 19th, and 20th National Congress of the Chinese Communist Party. He was a member of the 13th National Committee of the Chinese People's Political Consultative Conference. He was a delegate to the 14th National People's Congress.

== Early life and education ==
Dong was born in Xianju County, Zhejiang, in December 1962. After resuming the college entrance examination, in 1979, he enrolled at Hangzhou University (now Zhejiang University), where he majored in philosophy. He went on to study at the department of philosophy, Nankai University.

== Career ==
Starting in 1986, he served in several posts in the Central Party School of the Chinese Communist Party, including secretary of the 1st Office of the Marxist–Leninist Institute, director of the Human Rights Research Center (Human Rights Research Office of the Marxist–Leninist Institute), and deputy director of the Marxist–Leninist Institute. He was also director of the Office of the Chinese Society for Human Rights Research from 1995 to 2000.

He was director of the 7th Bureau of the Central Foreign Propaganda Office (State Council Information Office) in August 1997, in addition to serving as vice president and secretary-general of the Chinese Society for Human Rights Research since December 2000. He was made deputy director of the Central Foreign Publicity Office in November 2009, concurrently serving as deputy director of the State Council Information Office.

He was appointed head of the Publicity Department of Tibet Regional Committee of the Chinese Communist Party in December 2011 and was admitted to member of the CCP Tibet Regional Committee, the region's top authority.

He was assigned to the similar position in Shanghai in July 2015. In January 2018, he was elevated to chairman of the Shanghai Municipal Committee of the Chinese People's Political Consultative Conference, he remained in that position until January 2023, when he was appointed chairman of the Shanghai Municipal People's Congress.

== Downfall ==
On 12 July 2023, he has been placed under investigation for "serious violations of laws and regulations" by the Central Commission for Discipline Inspection (CCDI), the party's internal disciplinary body, and the National Supervisory Commission, the highest anti-corruption agency of China. On December 12, he has been stripped of his posts within the CCP and in the public office, and his qualification for delegates to the 20th National Congress of the Chinese Communist Party was terminated. On December 19, he was arrested by the Supreme People's Procuratorate.

On 24 April 2024, Dong was indicted on suspicion of accepting bribes. On June 27, he stood trial at the Intermediate People's Court of Hefei on charges of taking bribes, the public prosecutors accused him of abusing his multiple positions between 2002 and 2023 to seek favor on behalf of certain organizations and individuals in financing loans, land transfers, business operations, and personnel arrangements, in return, he accepted money and gifts worth more than 148 million yuan ($20.77 million) personally or through his family members. On August 28, Dong was convicted of receiving 148 million yuan in bribes and sentenced to life in prison.

== Publications ==
- 国家人权机构总览 [Overview of National Human Rights Institutions] (in Chinese). Beijing: Tuanjie Publishing House. 2011. ISBN 978-7-5126-0557-2.
- 人权大宪章 [Magna Carta of Human Rights] (in Chinese). Beijing: Central Party School of the Chinese Communist Party Publishing House. 2010. ISBN 9787503543746.
- 中国的妇女人权 [Women's Human Rights in China] (in Chinese). Chengdu, Sichuan: Sichuan People's Publishing House. 1995. ISBN 9787220029431.
- 中国人权年鉴 [China of Human Rights In China] (in Chinese). Beijing: Contemporary World Publishing House. 2000. ISBN 9787801153111.
- 中国西藏事实与数字2008 [Facts and Figures in Tibet, China in 2008] (in Chinese and English). Beijing: Foreign Languages Publishing House. 2008. ISBN 9787119053745.

Government offices
| Preceded by Cai Mingzhao | Deputy Director of the State Council Information Office; 2009–2011 | Succeeded by Cui Yuying |
Party political offices
| Preceded by Cui Yuying | Head of the Publicity Department of Tibet Regional Committee of the Chinese Communist Party; 2011–2015 | Succeeded by Jiang Jie |
| Preceded by Xu Lin | Head of the Publicity Department of Shanghai Municipal Committee of the Chinese Communist Party; 2015–2018 | Succeeded by Zhou Huilin |
Assembly seats
| Preceded by Wu Zhiming | Chairman of the Shanghai Municipal Committee of the Chinese People's Political Consultative Conference; 2018–2023 | Succeeded by Hu Wenrong |
| Preceded by Jiang Zhuoqing | Chairman of the Shanghai Municipal People's Congress; 2023 | Succeeded by Huang Lixin |
