= Liu Yungeng =

Chinese politician

- 刘云耕

Chairman of Shanghai Municipal People's Congress
- In office 2008–2013

Personal details
- Born: July 1947 (age 78)
- Party: Chinese Communist Party

Liu Yungeng (Chinese: 刘云耕; born July 1947) is a Chinese politician, former chairman of Shanghai Municipal People's Congress. He served as the police chief of Shanghai in the 1990s, before being promoted to head the Political and Legal Affairs Commission of Shanghai in 2000 and being made Chinese Communist Party Deputy Committee Secretary. He was further elevated to Chairman of the Shanghai Municipal People's Congress in 2008 upon reaching the age of 60. He served for one term before retiring from politics.
