= Shanghai Municipal People's Congress =

People's congress of Shanghai

Shanghai Municipal People's Congress 上海市人民代表大会
- 16th Shanghai Municipal People's Congress

Type
- Type: Province-level people's congress
- Established: 16 August 1954

Leadership
- Chairwoman: Huang Lixin, CPC since January 24, 2024
- Vice Chairpersons: Zheng Gangmiao, CPC; Zhou Huilin, CPC; Zong Ming, CPC; Chen Jing, CPC; Zhang Quan, CPWDP; Xu Yisong, RCCK since January 28, 2018
- Secretary-General: Xie Jiangang, CPC since January 15, 2023

Structure
- Seats: 855 (include members of Standing Committee is 57)
- SMPC political groups: Government (868): CPC (558); RCCK (19); CDL (30); CNDCA (26); CAPD (24); CPWDP (16); CZGP (14); JS (35); TDSL (3); Others (7); Independent (115); PLA (21)
- SCSMPC political groups: Government (57): CPC (38); RCCK (1); CDL (1); CNDCA (1); CAPD (1); CPWDP (1); CZGP (1); JS (2); TDSL (1); Independent (9); PLA (1)
- SMPC committees: 8: Law; Internal and Judicial Affairs; Financial and Economic; Education, Science, Culture and Public Health; Urban Construction and Environmental Protection; Overseas Chinese, Ethnic and Religious Affairs; Foreign Affairs; Agricultural and Rural Affairs

Elections
- SMPC voting system: Plurality-at-large voting & Two-round system
- Last SMPC election: 15 January 2023
- Next SMPC election: January 2028

Meeting place
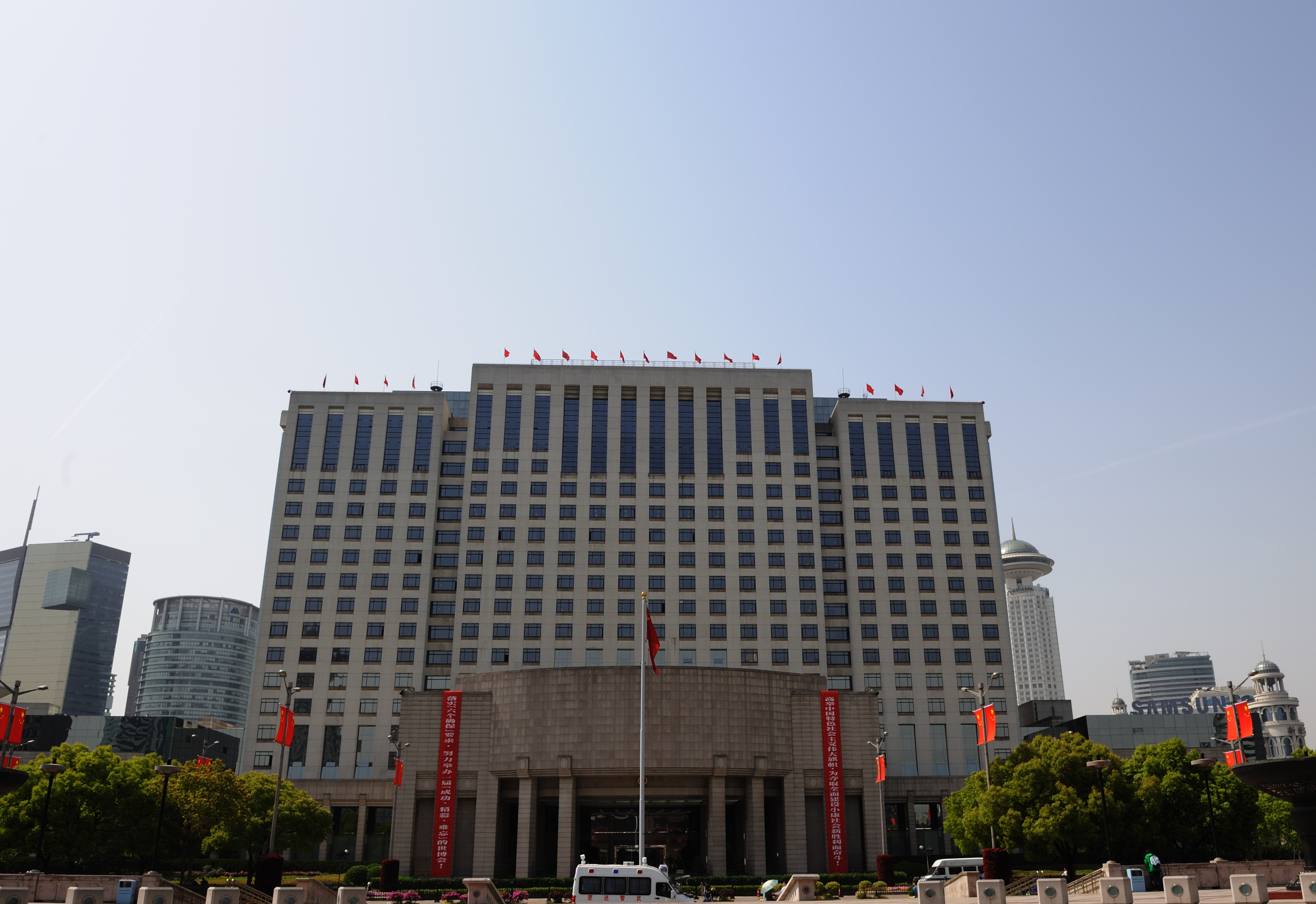
- No.200 People Avenue, Shanghai

Website
- www.spcsc.sh.cn

Shanghai Municipality People's Congress
- Simplified Chinese: 上海市人民代表大会
- Traditional Chinese: 上海市人民代表大會
Transcriptions
Standard Mandarin
- Hanyu Pinyin: Shànghǎi Shì Rénmín Dàibiǎo Dàhuì

The Shanghai Municipal People's Congress is the local people's congress of Shanghai. With 855 members in 2020, People's Congress is the elected council of Shanghai that oversees the Shanghai Municipal People's Government. The Municipal People's Congress is elected for a term of five years. It holds annual sessions every spring, usually lasting from 5 to 7 days, in the Shanghai Expo Center in Pudong of Shanghai, and these annual meetings provide an opportunity for the officers of Shanghai to review past policies and present future plans to Shanghai.

== History ==
In November 2015, the SMPC launched a public account on WeChat.

== Organization ==
=== Chairpersons ===
Name	Took office	Left office
Yan Youmin	1979	1981
Hu Lijiao	1981	1988
Ye Gongqi (叶公琦)	1988	1998
Chen Tiedi (陈铁迪)	February 1998	February 2003
Gong Xueping (龚学平)	February 2003	January 2008
Liu Yungeng	January 2008	January 2013
Yin Yicui	February 2013	January 2020
Jiang Zhuoqing	January 20, 2020	January 15, 2023
Dong Yunhu	January 15, 2020	July 12, 2023
Huang Lixin	January 24, 2024	Incumbent

== See also ==
- Politics of Shanghai
