= Yunnan Minzu University =

Provincial public university in Kunming, Yunnan, China

Coordinates: 24.84003°N 102.84969°E

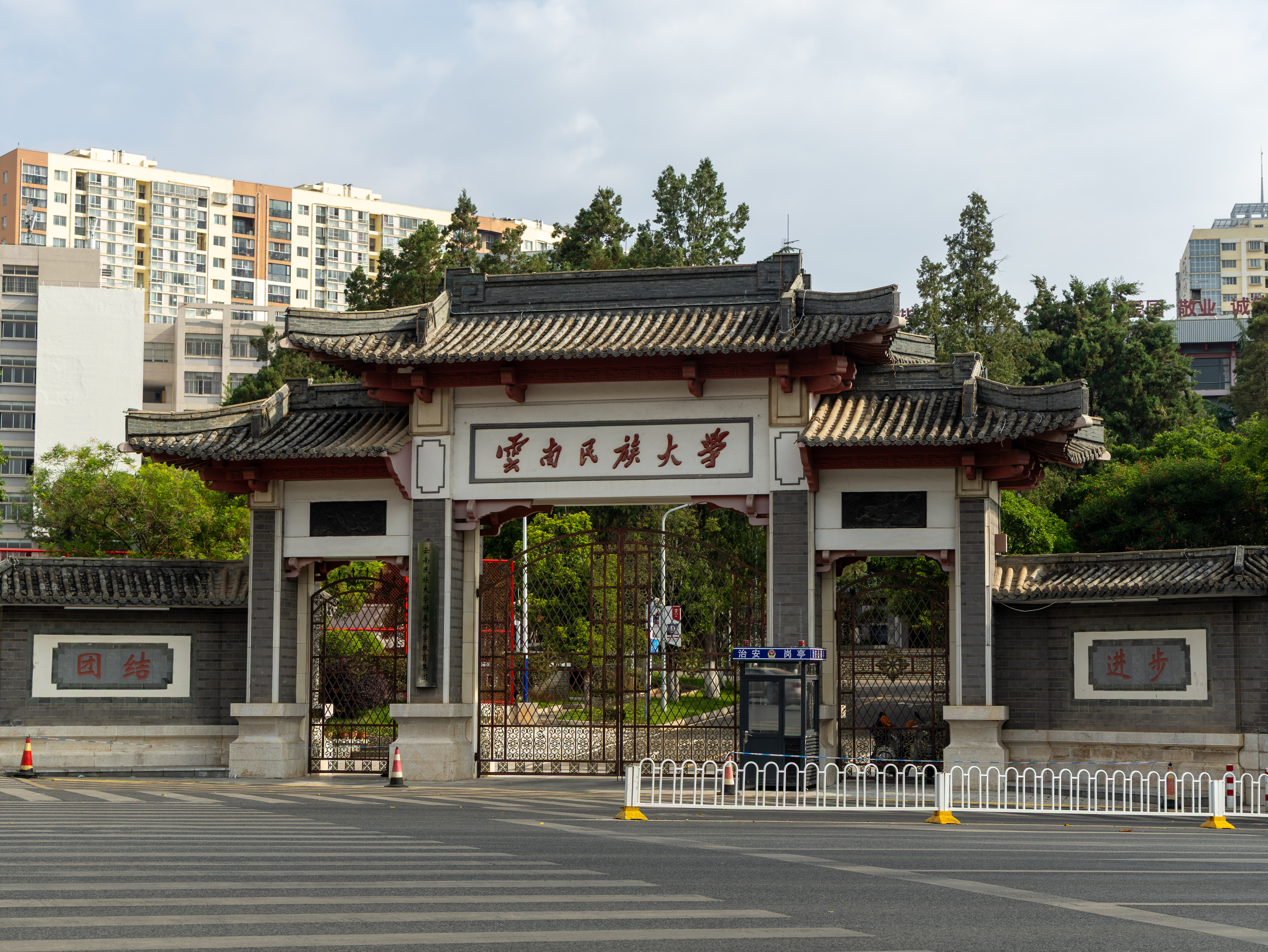
Entrance of main campus

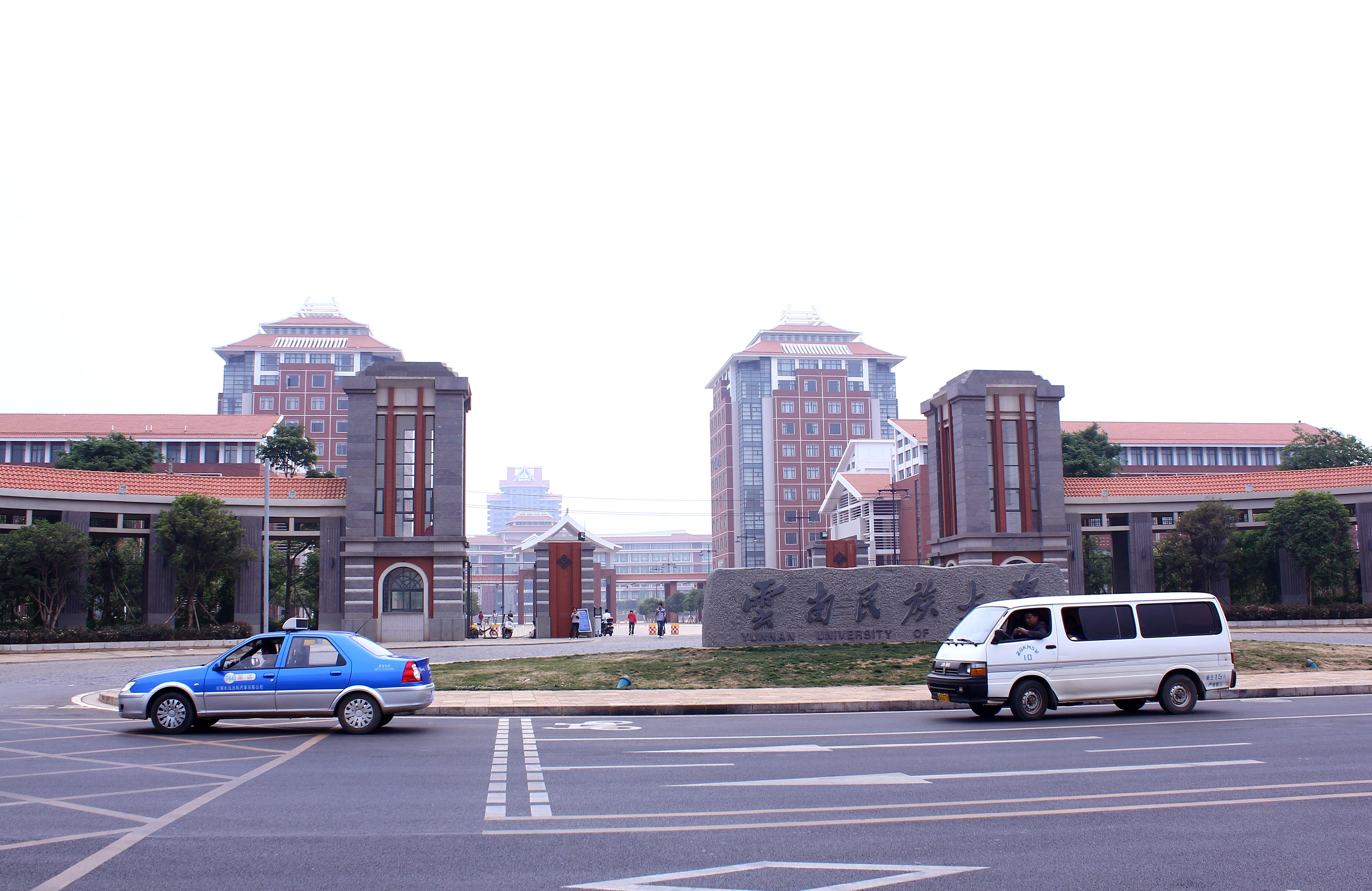
Entrance of Chenggong campus

Yunnan Minzu University (YMU; 云南民族大学) is a provincial public university in Kunming, Yunnan, China. It is affiliated with the Yunnan Provincial People's Government.

== History ==
Established on August 1, 1951 (75 years ago), the university was founded in part to instruct government leaders to assist minority ethnic groups of Yunnan to ensure their political rights.

The school was renamed Yunnan Minzu University (YMU) on April 16, 2003. Subsequent university goals have included the need to cultivate professional support for ethnic groups to ensure political, economic and cultural development and to foster international outreach.

Yunnan Minzu University has established cooperative relations with 26 universities in 10 nations, including Baylor University and University of Virginia, USA; University of Bergen, Norway; and La Trobe University, Australia.

Since its establishment, the university has received over 20,000 students and scholars from over 80 countries, visiting to study or to conduct academic exchanges and scientific research.

In February 1993, Yunnan Provincial People's Government ranked the institute as a key university of the province.

== Research ==
Research includes three key disciplines: Languages & Literature of Minority Ethnic Groups, Ethnic Ancient Books Studies, and National Economy.

Instruction includes five key courses on the provincial level: An Outline of Ethnology, The Socialist Construction of China, Theories & Policies Concerning Ethnic Groups, and Organic Chemistry

Research institutions resident at the university:

- The Academy of Ethnic Studies and the Visual Anthropology Study Center
- Academy of Languages & Literature of Minority Ethnic Groups
- Academy of national Economy under the administration of the Department of Economic Management
- The Ethnic Law Study Center and the Ethnic Theories Study Center
- The Southeast Asia Studies Center

== Staff ==
YMU has a staff of more than 870, of which 428 are teachers and more than 60 are professional researchers, with 36 being full professors and 215 associate professors. The honorary professors of the institute include Ji Xianlin and Zhou Yiliang, council members of the National Board of Education, Dai Ruwei, Ding Xiaqi and Yan Luguang, academicians of the Chinese Academy of Social Sciences, Liu Yaohan and Xu Qingzhang, nationally recognized educators of China.

== Campus and facilities ==
YMU has a land area of nearly 27 hectares and a floor area of 139,976 square meters. The institute has ample facilities for teaching. Its library include 710,000 books, over 2,000 journals and magazines, and a rare collection of ancient texts for ethnic studies including the Beiye Scriptures and the Dongba Scriptures.

Also associated with the university is the book center which the Asian Foundation established in China, including 41,557 books donated by the foundation. The museum inventory includes valuable ethnic relics (30,000 pieces) enabling local and foreign research.
