= Lu Hong =

Chinese politician (born 1968)

- 卢红

Communist Party Secretary of Wanzhou District
- Incumbent
- Assumed office July 2024
- Preceded by: Yu Huiwen

Head of United Front Department of Chongqing Municipal Committee of the Chinese Communist Party
- In office June 2022 – July 2024
- Preceded by: Li Jing
- Succeeded by: Shang Kui

Personal details
- Born: February 1968 (age 58) Jingyan County, Sichuan, China
- Party: Chinese Communist Party
- Education: Sichuan University; Chongqing University

Chinese name
- Simplified Chinese: 卢红
- Traditional Chinese: 盧紅
Transcriptions
Standard Mandarin
- Hanyu Pinyin: Lú Hóng

Lu Hong (Chinese: 卢红; born February 1968) is a Chinese politician, currently serving as head of the party secretary of Wanzhou District in Chongqing.

Lu is a representative of the 20th National Congress of the Chinese Communist Party and a member of the 20th Central Committee of the Chinese Communist Party.

== Biography ==
Lu was born in Jingyan County, Sichuan, in February 1968. Lu attended Sichuan University where he received her bachelor's degree in law in 1989. She also earned her MBA from Chongqing University in 2002, and studied at the School of Economics and Management, Tsinghua University in 2009 as a part-time student.

Starting in July 1989, Lu served in several posts in Chongqing Iron and Steel (Group) Co., Ltd., including deputy section chief, section chief, and director of supervision office.

Lu joined the Chinese Communist Party (CCP) in June 1993. In December 2003, she was assigned to the State owned Assets Supervision and Administration Commission of Chongqing, and worked there until 2009. Lu was admitted to member of the Standing Committee of the CCP Bishan County Committee, the county's top authority. She also served as secretary of the Party Working Committee of Bishan Industrial Park, chairman of the Bishan County Federation of Trade Unions, and head of the Organization Department of CCP Bishan County Committee. She was deputy party secretary of Wulong County (now Wulong District) in December 2016, in addition to serving as magistrate since January 2017. She was appointed party secretary of Rongchang District in March 2021 and four months later was admitted to member of the Standing Committee of the CCP Chongqing Municipal Committee, the city's top authority. In June 2022, she was appointed head of the United Front Work Department of the CCP Chongqing Municipal Committee. In July 2024, she was appointed as party secretary of Wanzhou District.

Government offices
Preceded by Jia Jianguo	Magistrate of Wulong County; 2016–2017	Succeeded by Position abolished
New title	Governor of Wulong District; 2017–2021	Succeeded by Zuo Jun
Party political offices
Preceded by Cao Qingyao	Secretary of the Rongchang District Committee of the Chinese Communist Party; 2021–2022	Succeeded by Gao Hongbo)
Preceded by Li Jing	Head of United Front Department of Chongqing Municipal Committee of the Chinese Communist Party; 2022–2024	Succeeded by Shang Kui
Preceded by Yu Huiwen	Communist Party Secretary of Wanzhou District; 2024–	Incumbent
