= Jiang Jie (artist) =

Chinese artist

- Born: 1965 (age 60–61)
- Education: Beijing Industrial Art Institute; Central Academy of Fine Arts
- Known for: Sculpture; Installation Art

Jiang Jie (Chinese: 姜杰; born in 1965), a Chinese artist and lecturer of sculpture studio in Central Academy of Fine Arts. She graduated from Beijing Industrial Art Institute in July 1984, majoring in Non-Traditional Machining; and she started working in the sculpture creation studio in Central Academy of Fine Arts after graduation from CAFA in July 1991, with a Sculpture major.

== Artistic practice ==
The themes of Jiang Jie's sculpture works reveal the instinct of humanistic care. She uses flowing sculpture lines to bring viewers imaginary space, highlighting a female perspective investigating the world. At the same time, her works point to weakness and fragility as well as the contradiction and tension of life. Her work is usually microscopic and psychological, even in large sculptural and installation works, which are derived from her observation towards the vulnerability and decay of life existence.

Jiang Jie's works have been characterized as introducing sculpture language into the field of installation. Another artistic indication that has been developed throughout her art-making is the theme of hope upon first impression, would usually turn out to be tragic atmosphere. Her use of infants is said to be inspired by Jiang Jie's sympathy, as she uses "mystery, vulnerability, softness, wetness, sensitivity and desolation" in infants' bodies to indicate the loneliness and fragility of adults.

== Representative artworks ==
=== Fragile Products (1994) (《易碎的制品》 ===
Similar to The Appearance of Life (1994), infants are also a theme in Fragile Products (1994) and the vulnerability of human beings. She expresses vulnerability in order to reveal the cruelty of life. Jiang Jie used moist and fragile wax to make infants with broken arms and legs that are slightly larger than the real sizes of babies. In an exhibition of the work she piled up 50 duplicated infants of three different poses, and put them into a sheet of thin film plastic six meters long and five meters wide. Because the corners and sides of the thin film were hung vertically, 50 shattered infants were inevitably squeezed and bumped into each other in a state of disorder.

The piece bridges the relationship between adult society and the world of children, as well as the relationship between soul and objects. It refers to the "fragility" of an infant or a person. At that time, Chinese feminist art criticism had not yet been fully realized, but Jiang Jie's works were classified as representing a kind of contemporary sculpture rather than Chinese feminist sculpture. After post-modernism spread in Chinese art circles, Jiang Jie's series of works had a stable relationship with feminism.

=== Parallel Men and Women (1996) (《平行男女》) ===
Still working with infants, in this work the infants were used as products of a conceptual change by the use of duplication on the basis of sculpture, to the use of ready-made children-like models. Jiang Jie used wax and gauze layers on the two childlike models which look the same and show no gender characteristics. She also reshaped their bones, muscles and gender organs, and placed the couple horizontally on the base in a position that their heads and legs are facing toward each other. Since the original childlike models' color and the shape of legs still somehow remained, people could still see the commercial image from them. Plus, with the traces of wrapped medical gauze, the whole piece became closer to audiences. The characteristic of soluble wax further enhanced the ambiguous sense.

=== Approaching (1995) (《接近》) ===
Composed of 28 wax infant models, this work included nets that were made of transparent silk and silk thread, the 28 infants were divided into several groups doing the same poses---as trying to approach each other with hands and faces up. The piece demonstrated that even if it's deliberate to get close to each other, they still couldn't really get close enough. The silk net that pulled by transparent silk thread in the air, which looks like a spider web, as well as the virtual scene under the lights both added a lot to this kind of absent-minded state and psychedelic atmosphere. Getting close to each other purposely would directly result in collision in the further step.

== Exhibitions ==
- 1992: “21st Century · China” show held in the National Art Museum Of China in Beijing.
- 1993: International Sculpture competition in Weihai, Shandong, in August, 1993.
- 1994: “Critical Point” in CAFA Gallery in Beijing in May, 1994; the Conceptual Collaboration Work with Artists from Hangzhou-Shanghai-Beijing in November, with the name “Agreed to the Date 26 Nov. 1994 as a Reason”.
- 1995: The collaboration work with artists from Hangzhou-Shanghai-Beijing in April, 1995, and the name of the activity was “45 Degrees as a Reason”. In the June, she attended the “Culture communication - the 2nd Conceptual Art Show” in Germany. In the August, she attended the Chinese Female Artist Invitational Exhibition held by National Art Museum Of China in Beijing. Also, in the same year she was invited to the Aarhus Art Festival in Denmark; and held exhibition in Aarhus Female Museum. In October, she attended the 6th Small Sculpture Exhibition in Stuttgart, Germany; also, she held a joint exhibition in CAFA with other two artists in Beijing. And she was nominated in the Chinese Art Critics Nomination of the year.
- 1996: “Chinese contemporary art documentary exhibition, sculpture” held in Chengdu, Sichuan.
- 1997: The first Invitational Exhibition of Chinese Contemporary Art in Hong Kong in February, 1997; in May, she was invited to the “In and Out - Chinese Contemporary Mainland & Overseas Artist Exhibition” held by LASALLE College of the Arts in Singapore (which toured in Australia and Hong Kong henceforth). In August, she attended the “Between Self and Society: the 90s Chinese Female Artist Exhibition” in Artemisia Gallery in Chicago, United States; and she attended the International Landscape Sculpture Competition in Guilin, Guangxi. In October, she attended the “First Sex · Female” artwork exhibition in Shanghai Academy of Fine Arts. In November, she held a jointed Exhibition called “Prolong” with other four artists in CAFA.
- 1998: “Century · Female Art Exhibition” in National Art Museum Of China in Beijing in March, 1998. In June, she attended the Chinese Female Artist Exhibition in Bonn Female museum in Germany. In July, she held her individual exhibition in BASE Gallery in Tokyo, Japan. In August, she went to the Mainland-Taiwan Sculpture creation studio in Taiwan. In October, she attended the Twenty years apocalypse - Chinese Important Artist work Exhibition; and the “Sculpture · 50 Years” exhibition held by sculpture creation studio in CAFA. in November, she held a four artists jointed exhibition in Crowne Plaza Museum in Beijing; and she attended the first Contemporary Sculpture Exhibition in He Xiangning Art Museum in Shenzhen.
- 2001: The 1st Chengdu Biannual Exhibition, Chengdu, Sichuan.
