= Ren Wei (politician) =

Chinese politician

- 任维

Executive Vice Chairman of Tibet Autonomous Region
- Incumbent
- Assumed office 10 December 2021 Serving with Chen Yongqi, Garma Cedain, and Tenba [zh]
- Chairman: Yan Jinhai; Garma Cedain

Personal details
- Born: May 1976 (age 50) Qishan, Baoji, Shaanxi, China
- Party: Chinese Communist Party (since 1997)
- Education: Tsinghua University

Chinese name
- Simplified Chinese: 任维
- Traditional Chinese: 任維
Transcriptions
Standard Mandarin
- Hanyu Pinyin: Rén Wéi

Ren Wei (Chinese: 任维; pinyin: Rén Wéi; born May 1976) is a Chinese business executive and politician currently serving as executive vice chairman of the People's Government of the Tibet Autonomous Region and a member of the standing committee of the Chinese Communist Party (CCP) Tibet Autonomous Regional Committee. Previously, he served as deputy general manager of China Datang Corporation and vice chairman of Tibet Autonomous Region.

== Biography ==
Ren was born in May 1976 in Qishan County in Baoji, Shaanxi. He studied thermal power engineering at Tsinghua University from 1993 to 2003 and eventually earned a Doctor of Engineering degree. He joined the Chinese Communist Party in June 1997.

Ren spent his early career at state-owned power generation companies. In July 2003, he joined China Guodian Corporation, initially serving as senior project manager in the commissioning department of Beijing Guodian Longyuan Environmental Engineering Co., Ltd. From 2007 to 2009, he held managerial positions in the planning and development department at Guodian Technology and Environmental Group. In November 2009, he became secretary of the Communist Youth League committee and deputy director of the political work department of China Guodian Corporation. In May 2016, Ren was appointed party secretary, deputy general manager, and head of the discipline inspection office of the Tibet branch of China Guodian Corporation. In May 2018, he became general manager and party secretary of Guodian's Tibet branch. In August 2018, Ren was transferred to China Datang Corporation, where he served as deputy general manager.

In April 2020, Ren was appointed vice chairman of the People's Government of the Tibet Autonomous Region, becoming the youngest deputy provincial-level official in China at the time and a rising star in Chinese politics. In November 2021, he was named a member of the standing committee of the CCP Tibet Autonomous Regional Committee. In December 2021, he assumed the position of executive vice chairman of the People's Government of the Tibet Autonomous Region.
