= Yu Huiwen =

Chinese politician

- 于会文

Communist Party Secretary of Hohhot
- Incumbent
- Assumed office 20 December 2025
- Deputy: He Haidong (Mayor)
- Preceded by: Bao Gang

Communist Party Secretary of Wanzhou District
- In office June 2022 – April 2024
- Preceded by: Mo Gongming
- Succeeded by: Lu Hong

Communist Party Secretary of Yubei District
- In office August 2021 – June 2022
- Preceded by: Tang Chuan
- Succeeded by: Chang Bin

Communist Party Secretary of Dazu District
- In office December 2019 – August 2021
- Preceded by: Zhang Yongwu
- Succeeded by: Chen Yiqing

Personal details
- Born: October 1968 (age 57–58) Suizhong County, Liaoning, China
- Party: Chinese Communist Party
- Education: Bohai University; Liaoning University; Northeastern University

Chinese name
- Simplified Chinese: 于会文
- Traditional Chinese: 于會文
Transcriptions
Standard Mandarin
- Hanyu Pinyin: Yú Huìwén

Yu Huiwen (Chinese: 于会文; born October 1968) is a Chinese politician of Manchu descent who is currently serving as party secretary of Hohhot, Inner Mongolia since December 2025.

He was a delegate to the 13th National People's Congress. He is a member of the 20th Central Committee of the Chinese Communist Party.

== Early life and education ==
Yu was born in Suizhong County, Liaoning, in October 1968. He attended Jinzhou Normal University (now Bohai University) where he received his bachelor's degree in chemistry in 1990. After completing his master's degree in engineering from Liaoning University in 1993, he entered Northeastern University where he obtained his doctor's degree in engineering in 2006.

== Career in Liaoning ==
Yu joined the Chinese Communist Party (CCP) in June 1993 upon graduation. He was a technician at the Planning and Design Institute of Liaoning Petrochemical Department in 1993 and two years later became an official in the Office of Liaoning Provincial Science and Technology Commission (later was reshuffled as Liaoning Provincial Department of Science and Technology). In January 1998, he was transferred to the Liaoning Provincial Analysis and Testing Research Center and moved back to the Office of Liaoning Provincial Department of Science and Technology in May 2001. He was transferred to the Science and Technology Political and Legal Department of Shenyang Municipal People's Government Office in May 2001, becoming deputy director in December of the same year and director in July 2002.

== Career in Sichuan ==
In May 2010, Yu was transferred to southwest China's Sichuan province and appointed deputy director of Sichuan Provincial Environmental Protection Department. In March 2014 he was admitted to member of the CCP Panzhihua Municipal Committee, the prefecture-level city's top authority, and was appointed executive vice mayor the next month. He was made deputy party secretary in July 2015. In August 2016, he was transferred back to Sichuan Provincial Environmental Protection Department as deputy party branch secretary. He was promoted to party branch secretary and director in January 2017, in addition to serving as director of Sichuan Provincial Nuclear Safety Administration.

== Career in Chongqing ==
Yu became party secretary of Dazu District in December 2019 before being assigned to the similar position in Yubei District in August 2021. In May 2022 he was admitted to member of the CCP Chongqing Municipal Committee, the city's top authority and appointed party secretary of Wanzhou District in June 2022.

== Career in Ministry of Ecology and Environment ==
In April 2024, Yu was appointed as vice minister of the Ministry of Ecology and Environment.

== Career in Inner Mongolia ==
On 20 December 2025, Yu was appointed as party secretary of Hohhot, the capital of Inner Mongolia.

Party political offices
Preceded by Zhang Yongwu	Communist Party Secretary of Dazu District; 2019–2021	Succeeded by Chen Yiqing
Preceded by Tang Chuan	Communist Party Secretary of Yubei District; 2021–2022	Succeeded by Chang Bin
Preceded by Mo Gongming	Communist Party Secretary of Wanzhou District; 2022–2024	Succeeded by Lu Hong
Preceded by Bao Gang	Party Secretary of Hohhot; 2025–	Incumbent
Government offices
Preceded by Jiang Xiaoting	Director of Sichuan Provincial Environmental Protection Department; 2017–2018	Succeeded by Position revoked
New title	Director of Sichuan Provincial Ecology and Environment Department; 2018–2019	Succeeded by Wang Bo
