= Hu Wenrong =

Chinese politician

- 胡文容

Chairman of the Shanghai Committee of the CPPCC
- Incumbent
- Assumed office January 2023
- Preceded by: Dong Yunhu

Head of the Organization Department of the Shanghai Municipal Committee of the Chinese Communist Party
- In office December 2020 – January 2023
- Preceded by: Yu Shaoliang

Personal details
- Born: July 1964 (age 62) Putian County, Fujian, China
- Party: Chinese Communist Party
- Education: Tongji University

Hu Wenrong (Chinese: 胡文容; pinyin: Hú Wénróng; born July 1964) is a Chinese politician currently serving as head of the Organization Department of the Shanghai Municipal Committee of the Chinese Communist Party.

He was an alternate of the 19th Central Committee of the Chinese Communist Party and is an alternate of the 20th Central Committee of the Chinese Communist Party. He was a representative of the 20th National Congress of the Chinese Communist Party.

== Biography ==
Hu was born in Putian County (now Putian), Fujian, in July 1964, and graduated from Tongji University.

Hu successively worked at Shandong University of Science and Technology, Shandong University of Technology (now Shandong University), and Shandong University. He joined the Chinese Communist Party (CCP) in May 1990.

Hu got involved in politics in December 2004, when he became an official of the Organization Department of the CCP Shandong Provincial Committee. He moved up the ranks to become deputy head in February 2009 and executive deputy head in March 2013. He also served as deputy party secretary of the State owned Assets Supervision and Administration Commission of Shandong from October 2011 to July 2014. He was appointed secretary-general of the CCP Shandong Provincial Committee in June 2017 and was admitted to member of the Standing Committee of the CCP Shandong Provincial Committee, the province's top authority.

In September 2017, he was transferred to southwest China's Chongqing city, where he was a member of the Standing Committee of the CCP Chongqing Municipal Committee and head of the Organization Department.

In December 2020, he was assigned to the similar position in east China's Shanghai city.

He is selected as the Chairman of the Shanghai Committee of the Chinese People's Political Consultative Conference in January 2023.

Party political offices
Preceded by Yu Xiaoming	Secretary-General of the Shandong Provincial Committee of the Chinese Communist Party; 2017	Succeeded by Wang Qingxian
Preceded by Zeng Qinghong	Head of the Organization Department of the Chongqing Municipal Committee of the Chinese Communist Party; 2017–2020	Succeeded by Peng Jinhui
Preceded by Yu Shaoliang	Head of the Organization Department of the Shanghai Municipal Committee of the Chinese Communist Party; 2020–2023	Succeeded by TBA
Assembly seats
Preceded by Dong Yunhu	Chairman of the Shanghai Committee of the CPPCC; 2023–present	Incumbent
