= People's Government of the Tibet Autonomous Region =

Provincial-level government of Tibet, China

- 西藏自治区人民政府 བོད་རང་སྐྱོང་ལྗོངས་མི་དམངས་སྲིད་གཞུང་།

Agency overview
- Formed: 1 August 1965; 60 years ago
- Type: Executive body of the Tibet Autonomous Region People's Congress
- Jurisdiction: Tibet Autonomous Region
- Agency executive: Yan Jinhai, Chairman
- Parent department: State Council of the People's Republic of China
- Child agencies: General Office; 24 Constituent Departments
- Website: www.xizang.gov.cn

Tibet Autonomous Regional People's Government is the provincial administrative agency of Tibet, People 's Republic of China. The provincial government consists of the Tibet Autonomous Regional People's Congress, the TAR People's Congress Standing Committee, and has a mandate to frame local laws and regulations, such as the use of the Tibetan language in the region. Additionally, rules for adapting national laws to the province are also the responsibility of the People's Government.

== Political leaders ==
Political leaders of Tibet include:

- Secretary of the Chinese Communist Party Tibet Autonomous Region Committee
- Chairmen of the Standing Committee of the Tibet Autonomous Region People's Congress
- Chairmen of the Chinese People's Political Consultative Conference Tibet Autonomous Region Committee

== Departments and institutions ==
Departments under the TAR government cover education, science and technology, economy and information technology, ethnic affairs, public security, civil affairs, justice, finance, human resources and social security, housing and urban-rural development, transportation, water resources, commerce, culture, tourism, veteran affairs, water, health.

The organization of the Tibet Autonomous Region People's Government includes:

- General Office of the Tibet Autonomous Region People's Government

=== Component Departments ===
- Development and Reform Commission
- Education Department of Tibet Autonomous Region
- Department of Science and Technology of Tibet Autonomous Region
- Economy and Information Technology Department
- Ethnic Affairs Commission
- Public Security Department of Tibet Autonomous Region
- Civil Affairs Bureau
- Department of Justice of the Tibet Autonomous Region
- Finance Bureau
- Human Resources and Social Security Department
- Natural Resources Department
- Ecology and Environment Department
- Housing and Urban-Rural Development Department
- Transport Commission
- Water Resources Department
- Agriculture and Rural Affairs Committee
- Commerce Commission
- Culture Department
- Health Commission
- Tourism Development Department
- Veterans Affairs Department
- Emergency Management Department
- Audit Office
- Foreign Affairs Office

=== Directly affiliated institution ===
- Tibet Autonomous Region Market Supervision Administration
- Tibet Autonomous Region Radio and Television Bureau
- Tibet Autonomous Region Sports Bureau
- Statistics Bureau of Tibet Autonomous Region
- Bureau of Rural Revitalization of the Tibet Autonomous Region
- Forestry and Grassland Bureau of Tibet Autonomous Region
- Religious Affairs Bureau of the Tibet Autonomous Region
- Tibet Autonomous Region Bureau of Medical Protection
- Tibet Autonomous Region National Defense Mobilization Office

=== Directly affiliated specialized institution ===
- State-owned Assets Supervision and Administration Commission (Chinese: 西藏自治区人民政府国有资产监督管理委员会)

=== Directly affiliated public institutions ===
- Tibet Autonomous Region Academy of Social Sciences
- Tibet Radio and Television Station
- Tibet Autonomous Region Academy of Agricultural and Animal Husbandry Sciences
- Tibet Autonomous Region Geology and Mineral Exploration and Development Bureau
- Tibet Autonomous Region Comprehensive Law Enforcement Team for Cultural Markets
- Tibet Autonomous Region Tibetan Language Working Committee Office

== See also ==
- Tibet Autonomous Regional Committee of the Chinese Communist Party
- Lhasa Municipal People's Government
