= Tibet Autonomous Regional Committee of the Chinese Communist Party =

Tibet Autonomous Regional Committee of the Chinese Communist Party 中国共产党西藏自治区委员会 ཀྲུང་གོ་གུང་ཁྲན་ཏང་བོད་རང་སྐྱོང་ལྗོངས་ཨུ་ཡོན་ལྷན་ཁང་།

Overview
- Type: Highest decision-making organ when Tibet Autonomous Regional Congress is not in session.
- Elected by: Tibet Autonomous Regional Congress
- Length of term: Five years
- Term limits: None
- First convocation: 24 February 1950
- Secretary: Hu Changsheng
- Deputy Secretary: Yan Jinhai (Chairman of the Standing Committee of the Tibet Autonomous Region People's Congress); Garma Cedain (chairman); Liu Jiang (Political and Legal Affairs Commission Secretary); Gong Huicai
- Secretary-General: Gong Huicai
- Executive organ: Standing Committee
- Inspection organ: Commission for Discipline Inspection

Website
- www.xzdw.gov.cn

Tibet Autonomous Regional Committee of the Chinese Communist Party
- Simplified Chinese: 中国共产党西藏自治区委员会
- Traditional Chinese: 中國共產黨西藏自治區委員會
Transcriptions
Standard Mandarin
- Hanyu Pinyin: Zhōngguó Gòngchǎndǎng Xīzàng Zìzhìqū Wěiyuánhuì

Abbreviation
- Simplified Chinese: 中共西藏自治区委
- Traditional Chinese: 中共西藏自治區委
- Literal meaning: Zhōnggòng Xīzàng Zìzhìqū Wěi
Transcriptions
Standard Mandarin
- Hanyu Pinyin: CCP Tibet Autonomous Regional Committee/ CCP Xizang Autonomous Regional Committee

The Tibet Autonomous Regional Committee of the Chinese Communist Party, also called the Xizang Autonomous Regional Committee of the Chinese Communist Party, is the regional committee of the Chinese Communist Party (CCP) in the Tibet Autonomous Region. The CCP committee secretary is the highest ranking post in the region. The current secretary is Wang Junzheng, who succeeded Wu Yingjie on 18 October 2021.

== History ==
=== Tibet Work Committee ===
On January 2, 1950, Mao Zedong, who was still visiting the Soviet Union, telephoned the CCP Southwest Bureau (Chinese: 中共中央西南局), requesting the formation of a leading organ for operating Tibet. The CCP Southwest Bureau then reported to the Central Committee of the Chinese Communist Party that the 18th Army would be the main body responsible for advancing into Tibet, and proposed the establishment of a Tibet Working Committee, with Zhang Guohua, Tan Guansan (Chinese: 谭冠三), Wang Qimei (Chinese: 王其梅), Chang Binggui (Chinese: 昌炳桂), Chen Mingyi (Chinese: 陈明义), Liu Zhenguo (Chinese: 刘振国), and Sanggyai Yexe as members, with Zhang Guohua as secretary, Tan Guansan as deputy secretary. This plan was approved by the Central Committee on January 24, 1950, and the first enlarged meeting of the Party Committee of the 18th Army was held in Leshan, Sichuan Province, from January 27 to 30, announcing the decision of the Central Committee and marking the formal establishment of the CCP Tibet Work Committee. Li Jue was transferred to be the second chief of staff of the 18th Army and was added as a member of the Tibet Work Committee; on May 19, the Southwest Bureau approved the appointment of Phuntsok Wangyal as a member of the Tibet Work Committee; on September 24, Sanggyai Yexe was transferred to work in Xikang and left the Work Committee.

On June 11, 1951, the CCP Central Committee, in communication with the CCP Southwest Bureau and the CCP Northwest Bureau, approved the addition of Fan Ming, Mu Shengzhong (Chinese: 慕生忠), and Ya Hanzhang (Chinese: 牙含章) to the original list of candidates for participation, and added Fan Ming as deputy secretary. On March 7, 1952, the CCP Central Committee telegraphed to the Tibetan Workers' Committee, deciding that Zhang Jingwu would also be the secretary, Zhang Guohua the first deputy secretary, Tan Guansan the second deputy secretary, and Fan Ming the third deputy secretary.

=== Tibet Autonomous Region Committee ===
On September 1, 1965, with the approval of the CCP Central Committee, the Tibet Workers' Committee was transformed into the CCP Tibet Autonomous Region Committee. Zhang Guohua became the first secretary of the Party Committee.

== Organization ==
The organization of the CCP Tibet Autonomous Region Committee includes:

- General Office

=== Functional Departments ===
- Organization Department
- Publicity Department
- United Front Work Department
- Political and Legal Affairs Commission

=== Offices ===
- Policy Research Office
- Office of the Comprehensively Deepening Reforms Commission
- Office of the National Security Commission
- Office of the Cyberspace Affairs Commission
- Office of the Leading Group for Inspection Work
- Letters and Calls Bureau

=== Dispatched institutions ===
- Working Committee of the Organs Directly Affiliated to the Tibet Autonomous Regional Committee

=== Organizations directly under the Committee ===
- Tibet Party School
- Tibet Daily
- Tibet Institute of Socialism
- Party History Research Office
- Tibet Regional Archives

== Leadership ==
The Regional Committee Secretary is the highest-ranking official in Tibet. The Chairman of the Tibetan Autonomous Region People's Government usually serves as the Deputy Committee Secretary and is always an ethnic Tibetan.

=== Party Committees ===
7th Region Party Committee (October 23, 2006 - November 2011)

- Secretary: Zhang Qingli (- August 2011), Chen Quanguo (August 2011-)
- Deputy Secretaries: Legqog (-January 2010), Qiangba Puncog, Hu Chunhua (-December 2006), Hao Peng
- Standing Committee Members: Dong Guishan, Pasang Dondrup, Wu Yingjie, Wang Bingyi, Cui Yuying, Losang Jamcan, Padma Choling, Jin Shubo, Yin Deming, Gönbo Zhaxi

8th Regional Party Committee (November 2011-November 2016)

- Secretary: Chen Quanguo (- August 2016), Wu Yingjie (August 2016 - October 2021)
- Deputy Secretaries: Qiangba Puncog, Padma Choling, Hao Peng (-March 2013), Wu Yingjie (Executive Deputy Secretary in April 2013-August 2016), Losang Jamcan (December 2012-), Deng Xiaogang (April 2013-)
- Standing Committee Members: Chen Quanguo (-August 2016), Qiangba Puncog, Padma Choling, Hao Peng, Wu Yingjie, Yang Jinshan (-July 2013), Cui Yuying (-December 2011), Losang Jamcan, Jin Shubo (-December 2013), Yin Deming (-February 2012), Gönbo Zhaxi, Qin Yizhi ( -March 2013), Qi Zala, Deng Xiaogang, Losang Dondrup, Dong Yunhu (December 2011-August 2015), Liang Tiangeng (March 2012-December 2014), Diao Guoxin (December 2012-August 2016), Duotuo (June 2013-), Wang Ruilian (June 2013-), Ding Yexian (June 2013-), Wang Congjun (January 2014-), Zeng Wanming (December 2014-), Jiang Jie (January 2016-), Tangod (October 2016-)

9th Regional Party Committee (November 2016–November 2021)

- Secretary: Wu Yingjie (until 18 October 2021), Wang Junzheng (from 18 October 2021)
- Deputy Secretaries: Losang Jamcan, Che Dalha (until October 2021), Deng Xiaogang (until March 2017), Ding Yexian (June 2017–January 2021), Zhuang Yan (from June 2017; full-time from February 2021), Yan Jinhai (from July 2020), Chen Yongqi (from October 2021)
- Other Standing Committee members: Ding Yexian (until January 2021), Norbu Dondrup (until January 2021), Tangod, Wang Ruilian (until February 2017), Wang Yongjun (until June 2019), Zeng Wanming (until November 2018), Jiang Jie, Penpa Tashi (until July 2020), He Wenhao (until October 2021), Pema Wangdu, Fang Lingmin (May–September 2017), Xu Yong (January 2018–September 2019), Liu Jiang (from June 2018), Wang Weidong (from June 2019), Zhang Xuejie (from January 2020), Wang Haizhou (from February 2021), Garma Cedain (from October 2021), Xiao Youcai (from October 2021), Lai Jiao (from November 2021)

10th Regional Party Committee (November 2021–)

- Secretary: Wang Junzheng
- Deputy Secretaries: Losang Jamcan (until October 2023), Yan Jinhai, Zhuang Yan (until August 2023), Chen Yongqi, Liu Jiang (from October 2023)
- Other Standing Committee members: Zhuang Yan, Zhang Xuejie (until December 2021), Liu Jiang, Wang Weidong, Wang Haizhou, Lai Jiao, Ren Wei, Phurbu Dondrup (until October 2023), Garma Cedain, Dawa Tsering, Yin Hongxing (from March 2023)

== See also ==
- People's Government of the Tibet Autonomous Region
- List of modern political leaders of Tibet
