= Office of the Representative of the Central People's Government in Tibet =

Coordinates: 29.685497°N 91.088842°E

The former site of the Office of the Representative of the Central People's Government in Tibet (Chinese: 中央人民政府驻藏代表办公处旧址) is a building located in the courtyard of the Party School of the Tibet Autonomous Regional Committee of the Chinese Communist Party in the western suburb of Lhasa, Tibet Autonomous Region of China, and was originally used as the office and lodging of Zhang Jingwu, the representative of the Central People's Government in Tibet.

== History ==
The building was constructed by the Central People's Government of the People's Republic of China in 1964, and was completed in 1965 as the office and lodging of Zhang Jingwu, the representative of the Central People's Government in Tibet. On September 29, 2006, on the occasion of the 100th anniversary of Zhang Jingwu's birth, the Tibet Autonomous Region held a ceremony for the unveiling of the building of the representative of the Central People's Government in Tibet in the Party School of the Tibet Autonomous Regional Committee of the Chinese Communist Party, which was organized by the Standing Committee of the CCP Committee of the Tibet Autonomous Region. Wu Yingjie, member of the Standing Committee of the CCP Committee of the TAR and Vice Chairman of the People's Government of Tibet Autonomous Region, attended the ceremony and delivered a speech, unveiled a plaque for the building. Around 2010, the restoration project of the building was started.

In 2009, the "Office of the Representative of the Central People's Government in Tibet" was announced as one of the fifth batch of Cultural Relics Protection Units in the Tibet Autonomous Region, and in 2013, the "Former Site of the Office of the Representative of the Central People's Government in Tibet" was announced as one of the seventh batch of national key cultural relics protection units. The maintenance and protection of the old site and the exhibition were completed in July 2022. On March 28, 2023, the Publicity Department of the CCP Committee of the Tibet Autonomous Region named the site as a patriotic education base of the autonomous region.
