= List of universities and colleges in Tibet =

The following is a list of universities and colleges in the Tibet (Xizang, 西藏) region of China. As of 2012, there are 5 institutions of higher learning in the province, out of which 3 offer Bachelor-degree studies.

== Provincial universities ==
- Tibet University (西藏大学, Lhasa and Nyingchi, Project 211, Double First-Class Construction)

== Provincial colleges with bachelor-degree studies ==
- Tibet Minzu University (西藏民族学院, located in Xianyang, Shaanxi but under supervision of the Tibetan provincial government)
- Tibet University of Traditional Tibetan Medicine (西藏藏医学院, Lhasa)

== Provincial colleges with sub-degree studies ==
- Tibet Vocational Technical College (西藏职业技术学院, Lhasa)
- Tibet Police Officers Institute (西藏警官高等专科学校, Lhasa)
