= Tibet Autonomous Region Guesthouse =

Coordinates: 29.65394°N 91.12134°E

The Tibet Autonomous Region Guesthouse (Chinese: 西藏自治区迎宾馆) is the official reception center of the Tibet Autonomous Region of the People's Republic of China, subordinate to the General Office of the Tibet Autonomous Regional Committee of the Chinese Communist Party, and is located on Yutuo Road in Lhasa.

Originally built in 1965 to welcome the establishment of the Tibet Autonomous Region, it underwent a large-scale renovation and expansion in 2002. The building was a landmark of Lhasa in the 1960s and one of the outstanding buildings in Lhasa in the 1960s.
