= Chinjor =

Chinjor (Chinese: 群觉) or Qunjue (December 1945 – May 27, 2017) was born in Chamdo, Tibet, and was a politician of the People's Republic of China.

== Biography ==
Chinjor joined the Chinese Communist Party (CCP) in November 1972 and started working in September 1966. He served as deputy director of the Chinese editorial department of Tibet Daily, member of the Standing Committee of the CCP Committee of Tibet Daily and director of the Collection and Communication Department, deputy editor-in-chief of Tibet Daily, editor-in-chief of Tibet Daily, and deputy director of the Publicity Department of the Tibet Autonomous Regional Committee of the CCP. In March 2000, he served as deputy director of the Tibet Autonomous Region Radio, Film and Television Bureau, and retired in September 2006 with the approval of the organization. He died in Lhasa on May 27, 2017, at the age of 72.
