= Tibet.cn =

Chinese Communist Party website

- Native name: 中国西藏网
- Website type: News
- Available in: Chinese, English, Tibetan, German, French
- Founded: 2000; 26 years ago
- Parent: Tibet Autonomous Regional Committee of the Chinese Communist Party
- Website: www.tibet.cn
- Current status: Active

Tibet.cn
- Simplified Chinese: 中国西藏网
- Traditional Chinese: 中國西藏網
Transcriptions
Standard Mandarin
- Hanyu Pinyin: Zhōngguó Xīzàng Wǎng

Tibet.cn, also known as China Tibet Online, is a Chinese state-affiliated news website that publishes news about the Tibet Autonomous Region under the control of the Tibet Autonomous Regional Committee of the Chinese Communist Party.

== History ==
The China Tibet Information Center Network was founded in 2000. At 15:00 on July 15, 2010, it was renamed China Tibet Net and held a press conference at the State Council Information Office on July 20, with editor-in-chief Zhang Xiaoping as the keynote speaker. The Tibetan-language version (tb.tibet.cn) was launched in 2001.

== Content ==
The website publishes information about Tibet in five languages: Chinese, English, Tibetan, German and French. The Weekend Holiday Edition is a special edition of China Tibet Online that is launched for holidays. It is available to Internet users every Saturday, Sunday and statutory holidays. It is the first Chinese website to publish a holiday edition.
