= Ding Yexian =

Chinese politician (born 1960)

- 丁业现

Executive Deputy Party Secretary of the Tibet Autonomous Region
- In office June 2017 – February 2021
- Preceded by: Deng Xiaogang
- Succeeded by: Zhuang Yan

Personal details
- Born: October 1960 (age 65–66) Yanggu, Shandong, China
- Party: Chinese Communist Party (1990-2026, expelled)
- Education: Sichuan Business School

Ding Yexian (Chinese: 丁业现; born October 1960) is a former Chinese politician, served as the vice chairperson of the Standing Committee of the Tibet Autonomous Region People's Congress and the Chinese Communist Party Deputy Committee Secretary of the Tibet Autonomous Region. He was an alternate member of the 19th Central Committee of the Chinese Communist Party.

== Biography ==
Ding is considered a native of Yanggu County, Shandong province. In January 1978, Ding was dispatched to the Shannan Prefecture of Tibet to work as an electric utility operator. In September 1985, he graduated from the Shandong Electronics Professional College (now Shandong College of Electronic Technology); he holds a bachelor's degree in computer science. In December 1996, Ding was promoted to the head of the economic and trade reform commission of Shannan Prefecture. In November 1998, he was named head of the Shannan department of finance. He was further promoted to the Tibet regional department of finance in April 2000, then in January 2003, assumed the post of director of the regional finance bureau.

In January 2009, Ding was named assistant to the Chairman of the Tibet Autonomous Region (TAR). In September 2010, he was promoted to Vice Chairman of the Tibet Autonomous Region. In June 2013, he was named a member of the regional party standing committee of the TAR, deputy party secretary of the TAR. In November 2016, he was named Executive Vice Chairman of the TAR. In June 2017, he was officially named the Executive Deputy Party Secretary of the Tibet Autonomous Region.

He also holds a part-time Master's of Business Administration from the Sichuan Business School (四川省工商管理学院).

In January 2021, Ding was served as the vice chairperson of the Standing Committee of the Tibet Autonomous Region People's Congress.

== Downfall ==
On 12 April 2026, Ding was suspected of "serious violations of laws and regulations" by the Central Commission for Discipline Inspection (CCDI), the party's internal disciplinary body, and the National Supervisory Commission, the highest anti-corruption agency of China. Ding was expelled from the party on 9 October.

Party political offices
Preceded by Deng Xiaogang	Executive Deputy Party Secretary of the Tibet Autonomous Region; 2017–2021	Succeeded by Zhuang Yan
