= Basang =

Tibetan politician

Basang or Pasang (Tibetan: དཔལ་བཟང་, Wylie: dpal bzang; Chinese: 巴桑; pinyin: Bāsāng; Wade–Giles: Pa-sang; born March 1937) is a retired Tibetan politician of the People's Republic of China. A former slave, she joined the People's Liberation Army and rose to prominence during the Cultural Revolution, when she became vice-chairwoman of the Revolutionary Committee of the Tibet Autonomous Region (TAR). She was a member of the Central Committee of the Chinese Communist Party for 14 years and was the only woman leader in the TAR government from 1979 to 2002.

== Biography ==
Basang was born in March 1937 in Gongkar, Lhokha, Tibet. Her parents were slaves, and after her mother died in 1947, Basang worked as a slave for nine years for the landlord of Chika.

In 1956, Basang escaped from slavery and joined the Chinese People's Liberation Army. She was sent to study at the Tibet Public School (now Tibet Minzu University) in Xianyang, Shaanxi Province. She joined the Chinese Communist Party (CCP) in May 1959, and became a cadre in Nêdong County, and later Nang County, both in Tibet. In July 1965, she was promoted to deputy county magistrate of Nang.

Basang rose to national prominence during the Cultural Revolution. In May 1966, her article praising Mao Zedong Thought was published in the People's Daily, the official CCP mouthpiece. In September 1969, when the Revolutionary Committee of the Tibet Autonomous Region (TAR) was established to replace regional government and Party organs, she was elected its vice-chairwoman.

She was elected Secretary of the new CCP Secretariat of TAR in August 1971, and Chairwoman of the Tibet Women's Federation in July 1973. In August 1973, she became a member of the 10th Central Committee of the Chinese Communist Party. After Deng Xiaoping came to power, most leaders who rose to prominence during the Cultural Revolution lost their positions, but Basang was reelected to the 11th and 12th Central Committees, keeping her seat until 1987.

Starting in 1979, Basang successively served as Deputy Chairwoman of TAR, Deputy Party Chief of TAR, and Deputy Chairwoman of the Chinese People's Political Consultative Conference (CPPCC) of TAR. She was concurrently vice-chairwoman of the All-China Women's Federation from 1998 to 2003. By the time she retired in late 2002, she had served for 24 years as the only woman in the leadership of the Tibet Autonomous Region. She continued to be a member of the National CPPCC until 2013.
