= Chen Quanguo =

Chinese politician (born 1955)

- 陈全国
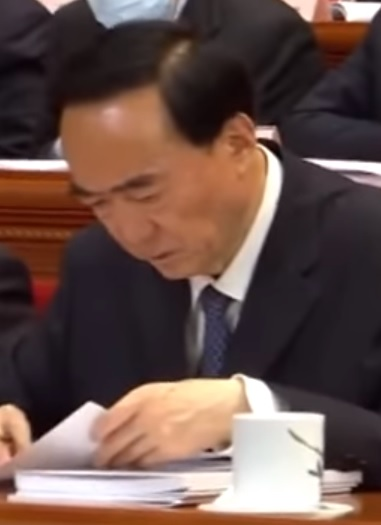
- Chen in 2020

Party Secretary of Xinjiang
- In office 29 August 2016 – 25 December 2021
- Deputy: Shohrat Zakir; Erkin Tuniyaz (chairman)
- General secretary: Xi Jinping
- Preceded by: Zhang Chunxian
- Succeeded by: Ma Xingrui

Party Secretary of Tibet
- In office 25 August 2011 – 28 August 2016
- Governor: Padma Choling; Losang Jamcan
- General secretary: Hu Jintao; Xi Jinping
- Preceded by: Zhang Qingli
- Succeeded by: Wu Yingjie

Governor of Hebei
- In office 15 December 2009 – 27 August 2011
- Leader: Zhang Qingli (party secretary)
- Preceded by: Hu Chunhua
- Succeeded by: Zhang Qingwei

Deputy Head of the Central Rural Work Leading Group
- In office 14 June 2022 – 22 October 2022
- Leader: Hu Chunhua

Personal details
- Born: November 1955 (age 70–71) Pingyu County, Henan, China
- Party: CCP (since 1976)
- Education: Zhengzhou University; Wuhan University of Technology

Military service
- Allegiance: China
- Branch/service: People's Liberation Army
- Years of service: 1973–1977

Chen Quanguo (Chinese: 陈全国; pinyin: Chén Quánguó; born November 1955) is a Chinese retired politician who was the Party Secretary of Tibet from 2011 to 2016 and the Party Secretary of Xinjiang from 2016 to 2021, making him the only person to serve as the Party Secretary for both autonomous regions. Between 2017 and 2022, he was a member of the 19th Politburo of the Chinese Communist Party and was also Political Commissar of the Xinjiang Production and Construction Corps concurrently with his position as Xinjiang Party Secretary.

Originally from Henan, Chen was among the first batch of students to graduate university after the resumption of Gaokao examinations in 1978. Chen worked up the ranks in the party bureaucracy in his home province from a minor local official to the deputy provincial party chief. In 2009, he became Governor of Hebei. In 2011 he became the Party Secretary, the top official, of the Tibet Autonomous Region, developing the region economically and instituting greater policing surveillance.

In 2016, Chen was promoted to the party secretary of Xinjiang. He has since then attracted press for overseeing Xinjiang re-education camps targeting Turkic minorities in the region, and he is considered as one of the main architects of the persecution of Uyghurs in China. In both Tibet and Xinjiang, he has earned a reputation for applying draconian measures to sinicize the traditional cultures. In 2022, he was given a post in the Central Rural Work Leading Group of the CCP, and retired later that year after the 20th CCP National Congress, when he was not re-elected to the CCP Central Committee.

== Early life and education ==
Born in November 1955, Chen Quanguo is a native of Pingyu County, Henan province. By dint of when he was born he avoided most of the Cultural Revolution and only suffered a delayed education. In December 1973, at the age of 18, Chen enlisted in the People's Liberation Army for four years. He served with the First Army, Third Division Artillery Regiment. He joined the Chinese Communist Party (CCP) in February 1976. After leaving the military in March 1977, he briefly worked at a car parts factory in Zhumadian.

After China resumed the National Higher Education Entrance Examination which was interrupted during the Cultural Revolution, in March 1978 Chen was admitted to the Economics Department of Zhengzhou University in the provincial capital Zhengzhou. At Zhengzhou University he studied political economy.

== Career ==
=== Henan ===
Chen Quanguo graduated from Zhengzhou University in December 1981 and returned to work in his hometown of Pingyu, Henan. Starting in 1983 he worked for the prefectural government of Zhumadian, and in 1988 became the Party Secretary of Suiping, a county under the administration of Zhumadian. In 1994, he was appointed the head of the Organization Department of the nearby prefecture-level city of Pingdingshan.

From 1995 to 1997 Chen enrolled as a part-time student at the School of Business Administration of Wuhan University of Technology, obtaining a master's degree in economics.From 1996 to 1998 he served as the Mayor and Deputy Party Secretary of Luohe, another prefecture-level city in Henan.

Chen was promoted to Vice Governor of Henan Province in January 1998, and worked in the administration of then Henan Governor Li Keqiang. Chen was regarded as a close confidante of Li. In November 2000 Chen was appointed by the CCP head of the Standing committee of the Henan Provincial committee in the provincial Organization Department. In April 2003 he became the Deputy Party Secretary, President of the Party School of the CCP, and the President of the Henan Institute of Administration.

=== Hebei (2009–2011) ===
In November 2009, Chen Quanguo was transferred to neighboring Hebei and promoted to Acting Governor and Deputy Party Secretary of the province. He replaced Hu Chunhua, who became the Party Secretary of Inner Mongolia. In January 2010 he was officially elected by the provincial congress as Governor of Hebei at the third session of the 11th National People's Congress.

=== Tibet (2011–2016) ===
On 25 August 2011, the CCP Central Committee announced the appointment of Chen to the remote Tibet Autonomous Region as Party Secretary, the top official of the region. On 8 May 2012, Chen Quanguo was elected the first secretary of the party committee of the Tibet Military Region.

Shortly after Chen took up his position in August 2011, the region advertised positions for 2,500 additional police, and Chen implemented a new security policy for Tibet in the form of "convenience police stations" (便民警务站). This divided urban centers into grids, allowing the authorities to systematically observe all activities within the area. As of early 2016, at least 156 of the concrete one- and two-story stations - stocked with wheelchairs, first aid kits, repair tools, umbrellas and even phone chargers for public use - were built in Lhasa, with guards on 24 hour "seamless" surveillance patrols, while two stations are only 15 meters apart. At least 544 more of these police stations exist throughout urban centers across Tibet.

Chen instituted a policy called the "double-linked household management system" to surveil 81,140 households in the Tibetan Autonomous Region, comprising more than three million people mobilized for security and social issues. The system is described as a method where neighbors spy on each other, while Kelsang Dolma in Foreign Policy writes the policy is an "Orwellian social system" where family members are encouraged to report on each other to authorities.

==== Self-immolations ====
There was a sharp rise in the number of self-immolations by Tibetan monks and nuns after Chen took office, which began and continued at Kirti Monastery. Within Tibet, 156 monks, nuns, and laypeople self-immolated as of December 2019. According to the International Campaign for Tibet's (ICT) Fact Sheet information, reviewed by Outside, "Chinese police have beaten, shot, isolated, and disappeared self-immolators who survived." The families are often arrested or detained, which led in 2014 to a rise in walking or solo protests.

Often, the self-immolators, and solo protestors, carry illegal pictures of the 14th Dalai Lama, and/or make long life prayers for the Dalai Lama, as well as shout for independence from China. The immolations were seen to be a form of extreme protest against the Chinese government's crackdown on Buddhists from the region, and described in Outside as offerings by the self-immolators of their bodies to show the world how badly Tibet is suffering. The Dalai Lama blames the self-immolations on Chinese policies, and said, "Some kind of policy, some kind of cultural genocide is taking place". In March 2011, before Chen began his tenure, the Dalai Lama resigned from his political role to continue in his role as Tibet's spiritual leader.

==== Arrests and disappearances ====
Tibet government-in-exile's Central Tibetan Administration leader Lobsang Sangay states, "If you protest in Tibet, more often than not you get arrested, or beaten up, sometimes tortured, sometimes you disappear, sometimes you die". Mysterious deaths were reported during Chen's tenure. The earlier mass arbitrary arrests of monks and nuns at Kirti Monastery in March–April 2011 were followed by reports of disappearances into custody, which continued through Chen's tenure.

In December 2013, Chen described his policy as a "Stability Maintenance Campaign" in a statement, included in a Human Rights Watch report:

We have followed the law in striking out and relentlessly pounding at illegal organizations and key figures, and resolutely followed the law in striking at the illegal organizations and key figures who follow the 14th Dalai Lama clique in carrying out separatist, infiltration, and sabotage activities, knocking out the hidden dangers and soil for undermining Tibet's stability, and effectively safeguarding the state's utmost interests [and] society's overall interests.

==== Re-education camps ====
During Chen's tenure, forced evictions of at least 5,000 nuns and monks studying at Larung Gar Buddhist Academy and residing in Larung Gar, began in 2013 and continued past August 2016, with a major demolitions order for 4,600 residences dated from June 2016. After residences were demolished, the nuns and monks were bussed away and reports by Tibetan Review, Radio France International, and Human Rights Watch (HRW) state 600 people were sent directly to re-education camps and centers located in Nyingtri, while a detention center in Sertar was being prepared for an additional 800 nuns. Other reported re-education centers and camps for the monastic community of Yarchen Gar are reported as located in and around Chamdo City and Jomda County.

More nuns than monks were forcibly evicted and detained. The HRW report also details persecution and abuses to which the nuns are subjected in Nyingtri, and refers to a video in which nuns are forced to sing and dance on a stage. Another 300 of Larung Gar's monastic Tibetan Buddhist practitioners, which were not directly detained in re-education camps, were to register for forced re-education programs with prefectures in their home towns. Reports also state the nuns and monks are banned from re-entering other monastic institutions.

==== Economic development ====
In 2015 during Chen's tenure, a transfer of 280,000 Han settlers to Tibet's capital Lhasa was authorized, as part of China's urbanization plans. The Central Tibetan Administration states 7.5 million Han and 6 million Tibetans live in the region, as of 2015, and adds, "Under the guise of the economic and social development, Beijing encourages its population to migrate to Tibet with the clear aim to marginalize Tibetans from the economic, educational, political and social life of the region". During Chen's tenure, Tibet's ethnic majority has been "swamped" by promoting economic development that encourages migration from elsewhere in China. In September 2011, at least 226 "key projects" for the development of Tibet were awarded to Han owned companies. Only Han college graduates in Tibet or Tibetans that speak fluent Mandarin secure well-paid private sector jobs. Chinese data shows that Tibet's GDP grew by 11.8% in 2012. The growth rate in 2013 was 12.1%. The growth rate in 2014 was 12%, ranking first in the country. The growth rate in 2015 was 11%, and the region's GDP exceeded 100 billion CNY for the first time. In the first half of 2016, Tibet led other provinces and cities in China at a growth rate of 10.6%.

=== Xinjiang (2016–2021) ===
On 29 August 2016, Chen became the Party Secretary of Xinjiang, replacing Zhang Chunxian. He was considered as the best fit for this as he has been successful in controlling Tibet in the past. Upon taking office in Xinjiang, Chen became the first senior official in the history of the People's Republic to have occupied the top posts of both Xinjiang and Tibet. It signaled that Chen was a candidate for the 19th Politburo of the Chinese Communist Party, to be installed in the autumn of 2017, as the party chief position in Xinjiang ordinarily held a seat on the Politburo. He concurrently served as the first secretary and political commissar of the Xinjiang Production and Construction Corps Party Committee. Chen was a member of the 19th Politburo of the Chinese Communist Party, elected in 2017. He was previously an alternate of the 17th Central Committee of the Chinese Communist Party, and a full member of the 18th Central Committee.

==== Counter-terrorism and detention camps ====
After Chen took office, he issued a written military order to Xi Jinping, General Secretary of the Chinese Communist Party, and put forward the slogan: "In Xinjiang, if there is no stability then all our efforts are for nothing." (在新疆，没有稳定一切皆为零) He has expanded counter-terrorism and anti-separatist efforts under orders from Xi. There have been no reported terrorist attacks in Xinjiang since 2017. According to Ming Pao, Chen's measures to maintain stability in Xinjiang have been affirmed by the top level of the Chinese Communist Party. His measures of disciplining them include: mass-engineering of the Muslim population through detainment camps, specialized boarding schools for Uyghur children, arbitrary arrests. In 2019, the State Council announced that the Chinese government had "destroyed 1,588 terrorist groups" and "arrested 12,995 terrorists" since 2014 in Xinjiang.

Chen has supposedly overseen the construction of a network of re-education camps. Chen expanded the detention camps in Xinjiang holding Muslim ethnic minorities. As a party boss for the region, Chen exhorted local officials to "round up everyone who should be rounded up." When the local officials who feared it would exacerbate ethnic tensions and stifle economic growth pushed back, Chen responded by purging them including one county leader who was jailed after quietly releasing thousands of inmates from the camps. Aside from camps, Chen has also increased surveillance of residents by using advanced technology as well as increasing police presence. Under Chen, a policy of "Pair-up and become family" is used to surveil households, many of which include men detained at the re-education camps. The wives of camp detainees must share a bed with the officials during an average 6-day stay. As Xinjiang Party Secretary, Chen promoted the recruitment of the local population into the police force. The Uyghurs have been put under a surveillance system that is able to detect facial features and clothing and accessories to distinguish them from the other ethnic and religious groups in the region. This information is pooled into a central database and aides the government to crackdown on any escapees from the detainment centres.

According to the Xinjiang Police Files, Chen, in his role as Xinjiang's party leader at the time, issued a shooting order for escaping prisoners in 2018, having spoken along those lines already in a classified 2017 speech. The internal-party speeches in the files contained one of May 2017, in which Chen advocated for indefinite detention or prison terms for those Uyghurs whose outlooks could not be changed to align with that envisioned by the Chinese Communist Party; and one of June 2018, in which he repeatedly referred to the "Xi Jinping-led Chinese Communist Party's strategy of governing Xinjiang", and said that "social harmony and long-term stability" was the most important task in Xinjiang, ahead of increasing the GDP of the province.

==== Economic development ====
Chen Quanguo continued to introduce policies such as economic development, employment protection, housing projects, infrastructure improvement, and ecological protection, increasing the GDP of Xinjiang Uyghur Autonomous Region from 752.9 billion CNY in 2012 to 1.38 trillion CNY in 2020, with an average annual growth of 9%. Infrastructure investment totaled 1.94 trillion CNY, with an average annual growth rate of 27.5%, forest coverage rate increased from 4.24% to 4.87%, and oasis forest coverage rate increased from 23% to 28%.

=== Return to Beijing and retirement ===
On 26 December 2021, Chinese state media announced that Chen would step down from his role as Party Secretary of Xinjiang. He was succeeded by Governor of Guangdong Ma Xingrui with immediate effect. In 2022, Chen was appointed as the deputy head of CCP Central Rural Work Leading Group. This was seen by Wu Qiang, a political analyst in Beijing, as his "last role" before retirement, despite previous expectations that he would join the CCP Politburo Standing Committee. He retired after the 20th National Congress of the CCP, due to the fact that he was not re-elected to the Central Committee despite being young enough to do so per informal age rules.

== Personal life ==
Chen has a daughter who attended a school in the United Kingdom while he was the governor of Hebei. The South China Morning Post has said that Chen is known for not putting jokes, slogans or personal anecdotes in official speeches. It also noted that he preferred to stay in the background during press meetings.

== Sanctions ==
On 9 July 2020, the United States government imposed Magnitsky Act sanctions and visa restrictions against Chen Quanguo, together with Zhu Hailun, Wang Mingshan and Huo Liujun. These sanctions were imposed as a result of Chen's involvement in the persecution of Uyghurs. With sanctions, he and his immediate relatives are barred from entering the U.S. and will have U.S.-based assets frozen. Chen, in an interview with Xinhua News Agency, called the sanctions a "naked, unreasonable and unreasonable hegemonic behavior", and said "I have no interest in going to the United States, and I don't have a penny of assets in the United States". On 10 December 2024, Minister of Foreign Affairs of Canada Mélanie Joly announced Canada's sanctions against Chen and seven other government officials of Xinjiang and Tibet involved in serious human rights violations.

== See also ==
- Islamization of Xinjiang
- History of Xinjiang
- Uyghur Human Rights Policy Act

Government offices
Preceded by Cheng Sanchang	Mayor of Luohe; 1996–1998	Succeeded by Liu Famin
Preceded by Hu Chunhua	Governor of Hebei; 2009–2011	Succeeded by Zhang Qingwei
Party political offices
Preceded by Zhi Shuping	Head of Organization Department of Henan Provincial Committee of the Chinese Communist Party; 2000–2004	Succeeded by Ye Dongsong
Preceded by Li Qinglin	Deputy Party Secretary of Henan; 2009–2011	Succeeded by Ye Dongsong
Preceded by Zhang Qingli	Party Secretary of Tibet; 2011–2016	Succeeded by Wu Yingjie
Preceded by Zhang Chunxian	Party Secretary of Xinjiang; 2016–2021	Succeeded by Ma Xingrui
