= Party Secretary of Tibet =

Regional government position in China

Secretary of the Tibet Autonomous Regional Committee of the Chinese Communist Party
- 中国共产党西藏自治区委员会书记
- Emblem of the Chinese Communist Party

- Flag of the Chinese Communist Party

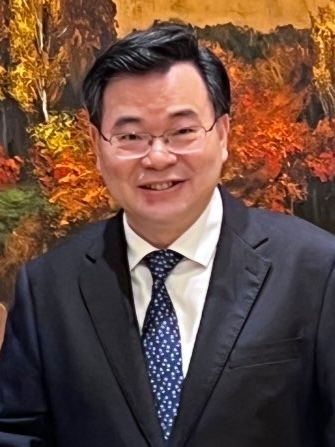
- Incumbent; Hu Changsheng since 22 September 2026
- Tibet Autonomous Regional Committee of the Chinese Communist Party
- Type: Party Committee Secretary
- Status: Provincial and ministerial-level official
- Member of: Tibet Autonomous Regional Standing Committee
- Nominator: Central Committee
- Appointer: Tibet Autonomous Regional Committee Central Committee
- Inaugural holder: Wang Zhen
- Formation: 24 January 1950
- Deputy: Deputy Secretary; Secretary-General

The secretary of the Tibet Autonomous Regional Committee of the Chinese Communist Party is the leader of the Tibet Autonomous Regional Committee of the Chinese Communist Party (CCP). As the CCP is the sole ruling party of the People's Republic of China (PRC), the secretary is the highest ranking post in the Tibet Autonomous Region.

The secretary is officially appointed by the CCP Central Committee based on the recommendation of the CCP Organization Department, which is then approved by the Politburo and its Standing Committee. The secretary can be also appointed by a plenary meeting of the Tibet Regional Committee, but the candidate must be the same as the one approved by the central government. The secretary leads the Standing Committee of the Tibet Regional Committee, and is usually a member of the CCP Central Committee. The secretary leads the work of the Regional Committee and its Standing Committee. The secretary is outranks the chairman, who is generally the deputy secretary of the committee and is customarily an ethnic Tibetan. The secretary is always an ethnic Han.

The current secretary is Hu Changsheng, who took office on 22 September 2026.

== List of party secretaries ==
No.	Image	Name	Term start	Term end	Ref.
1		Zhang Guohua (张国华) (1914–1972)	24 January 1950	June 1951	
2		Fan Ming (范明) (1914–2010)	June 1951	December 1951	
3		Zhang Jingwu (张经武) (1906–1971)	March 1952	September 1965	
4		Zhang Guohua (张国华) (1914–1972)	September 1965	February 1967	
5		Ren Rong (任荣) (1917–2017)	August 1971	March 1980	
6		Yin Fatang (阴法唐) (1922–2025)	March 1980	June 1985	
7		Wu Jinghua (伍精华) (1931–2007)	June 1985	1 December 1988	
8		Hu Jintao (胡锦涛) (born 1942)	1 December 1988	1 December 1992	
9		Chen Kuiyuan (陈奎元) (born 1941)	1 December 1992	16 October 2000	
10		Guo Jinlong (郭金龙) (born 1947)	16 October 2000	16 December 2004	
11		Yang Chuantang (杨传堂) (born 1954)	16 December 2004	29 May 2006	
12		Zhang Qingli (张庆黎) (born 1951)	29 May 2006	25 August 2011	
13		Chen Quanguo (陈全国) (born 1955)	25 August 2011	28 August 2016	
14		Wu Yingjie (吴英杰) (born 1956)	28 August 2016	18 October 2021	
15		Wang Junzheng (王君正) (born 1963)	18 October 2021	22 September 2026	
16		Hu Changsheng (胡昌升) (born 1963)	22 September 2026	Incumbent	
