= Tibet Daily =

Chinese Communist Party newspaper

Tibet Daily བོད་ལྗོངས་ཉིན་རེའི་ཚགས་པར།
- Type: Daily newspaper
- Owner(s): Tibet Autonomous Regional Committee of the Chinese Communist Party
- Founded: April 22, 1956
- Political alignment: Chinese Communist Party
- Language: Chinese, Tibetan
- Headquarters: Lhasa, Tibet Autonomous Region
- Website: www.chinatibetnews.com

The Tibet Daily (Chinese: 《西藏日报》 བོད་ལྗོངས་ཉིན་རེའི་ཚགས་པར།) is the official newspaper of the Tibet Autonomous Regional Committee of the Chinese Communist Party. It was launched on April 22, 1956, and is headquartered at No. 36 Dosenger Road, Lhasa.

== History ==
In the fall of 1951, after the People's Liberation Army entered Lhasa, the oil-printed tabloid Xinhua Telegraph (Chinese: 《新华电讯》) was established. The following year, it was renamed News Brief (Chinese: 《新闻电讯》), published in both Tibetan and Chinese, and began covering local news. After the annexation of Tibet by the People's Republic of China, the Preparatory Committee for the Tibet Autonomous Region was established. At that time, the CCP Tibet Work Committee decided to transform News Brief into a newspaper that would serve both as the official organ of the CCP and the Preparatory Committee for the Autonomous Region.

On April 22, 1956, Tibet Daily was launched. In February 1955, the CCP Tibet Work Committee reported to the Central Committee of the Chinese Communist Party its plans for the newspaper's establishment. By March 1955, the CCP Central Committee approved the proposal. In October 1955, Zhang Jingwu, the Central People's Government representative in Tibet, sought instructions from Chairman Mao Zedong regarding the creation of a large-scale bilingual newspaper in Tibetan and Chinese. He also requested Mao's inscription for the newspaper's masthead. Mao advised that "When publishing a newspaper in a minority area, the priority should be to produce it in the minority's script." He further noted that, unlike Qinghai, Tibet should have a Tibetan-language newspaper, and that decisions on the newspaper's name and operation should be made locally, without external imposition.

On February 18, 1956, the CCP Tibet Work Committee officially decided to found Tibet Daily, and by March 7, 1956, the newspaper's Party Group and Editorial Committee were established. During the 1959 Tibetan uprising, the CCP Tibet Work Committee, concerned for the newspaper's safety, ordered it to relocate to the north side of the Tibet Military District compound. At the same time, pro-Chinese figures like Kaxue Dondrub Tsetsujang and Geshe Tsetsuza were also moved to the new location. The area was fortified with bunkers, trenches, sandbags, and wells, and sufficient supplies were stored for months. The newspaper, together with the Xinhua Branch, formed a militia company led by Lu Shuangxin (Chinese: 陆双欣), with Zhang Dengxing (Chinese: 张登兴) serving as company commander, comprising over 60 armed militiamen. On March 20, more than 100 Tibetans attacked the newspaper office from Ramoche Temple, but the militia successfully repelled the assault.

In August 1965, Mao Zedong inscribed the masthead of Tibet Daily.
