= Chang Binggui =

Chinese Communist Party general

Chang Binggui (December 23, 1911 – July 12, 1978, Chinese: 昌炳桂), a native of Sheshang Village, Taishan Township, Anfu County, Jiangxi Province. He was a military general of the People's Republic of China and held the position of deputy chief of staff for the Shaanxi Provincial Military Region.

== Biography ==
In 1929, Chang Binggui became a member of the Communist Youth League of China, and in 1930, he enlisted in the Chinese Red Army. In August 1930, he was appointed squad leader of the first company of the 26th regiment of the 9th division of the Red Army. In March 1931, he ascended to the position of platoon leader within the Red Army, and in 1932, he became a member of the Chinese Communist Party. In November 1931, he assumed the role of deputy company commander of the Third Red Army. In October 1934, he accompanied the Third Red Army on the Long March, and in February 1936, he was appointed commander of the First Regiment of the Central Independent Regiment. From May 1938, during the Second Sino-Japanese War, he served as the chief of staff of the 686th Regiment of the 343rd Brigade of the 115th Division of the Eighth Route Army. Beginning in February 1940, he held the position of deputy chief of staff of the 2nd Column of the 129th Division of the Eighth Route Army. From April to December 1942, he was the deputy commander of the 7th Brigade of Instruction of the 12th Division of the 129th Division of the Eighth Route Army and of the Ji-Lu-Yu Military Region. From September to December 1943, he served as the deputy commander of the 5th Military Sub-Division of the Eighth Route Army. From September to December 1943, he served as the commander of the Fifth Military Sub-District under the Ji-Lu-Yu Military Region, which later became the Southwest Lu Military Sub-District. Subsequently, he traveled to Yan'an to pursue studies at the CCP's Central Party School, and from April to June 1945, he participated in the 7th National Congress of the Chinese Communist Party. From November of the same year until July 1946, he held the position of Chief of Staff of the Seventh Column of the Jin-Hei-Lu-Yu Military Region of the Eighth Route Army, and from July to November 1946, he served as Chief of Staff of the Seventh Column of the Jin-Ji-Lu-Yu Field Army. From October 1946 until October 1947, he served as the commander of the 19th Brigade of the 7th Column of the Jin-Ji-Lu-Yu Field Army; from October 1947 to April 1948, he held the position of deputy commander of the E-Yu Military Region in the Central Plains; in December 1947, he was appointed chief of staff and commander of the 1st Brigade of Instruction of the E-Yu Military Region.

From April 1948 until August 1948, Chang Binggui served as the chief of the teaching brigade of the E-Yu Military Region. From May 1948 until February 1949, he served as the deputy commander of the Central Plains Military Region and the E-Yu Military Region of the Central Plains Field Army. In June 1948, when the Central Plains Field Army commenced the Battle of Wandang and Yudong, the Kuomintang Army was compelled to evacuate its forces from the Dabie Mountains. The conflict with the adversary in the E-Yu Military Region progressively transitioned from a passive to an active stance. To enhance leadership, the military area will comprise five sub-districts of 53 regiments and three sub-districts of 55 regiments, centered under the teaching brigade, with Chang Binggui as brigade commander and Li Shicai serving as political commissar.

From August 1948 until January 1949, Chang Binggui served as the commander of the first brigade of the teaching brigade inside the E-Yu Military Region of the Central Plains Military Region. From January to February 1949, he served as the commander of the Independent First Brigade of the E-Yu Military Region inside the Central Plains Military Region. From February to September, Chang Binggui held the position of deputy commander of the 18th Army of the Fifth Regiment of the Second Field Army of the People's Liberation Army, leading forces in the Huaihai campaign, the Yangtze River Crossing campaign, and the Battle of the Great Western Southwest.

Following the establishment of the People's Republic of China, from October 1949 until February 1952, Chang Binggui held the position of deputy commander of the 18th Army, and in January 1950, he was appointed as a member of the CCP Tibet Working Committee. From the same month until June, he served as the head of the Southwest Military Region Support Command, overseeing support for the advance into Tibet and contributing to the organization of the Battle of Chamdo. In December, he enrolled at the Nanjing Military Academy for his studies. In February 1952, he was designated as the third deputy commander of the Tibet Military District; nevertheless, he was sent within the same year to the military college as the director of the third class of the senior department, thereby not participating in the PLA's operations in Tibet. In June 1954, he was enrolled in the East China Higher Cadre Culture Class. In 1955, he attained the rank of colonel and received the August 1 Medal (2nd Class), the Order of Independence and Freedom (2nd Class), and the Order of Liberation (1st Class).

Chang Binggui faced serious repercussions from the Central Military Commission for his unsuccessful attempt to poison his wife during a divorce proceeding. Then, he held the position of deputy chief of staff of the Shaanxi Provincial Military Region from June 1957 to April 1963 and died on July 12, 1978, in Xi'an due to sickness.
