= Wang Junzheng =

Chinese politician

- 王君正
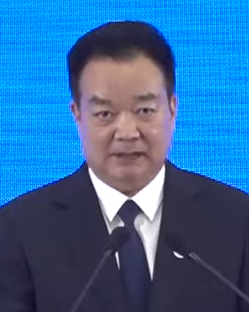
- Wang in 2023

Party Secretary of Tibet
- In office 18 October 2021 – 22 September 2026
- Deputy: Yan Jinhai; Garma Cedain (chairman)
- Preceded by: Wu Yingjie
- Succeeded by: Hu Changsheng

Party Secretary of Xinjiang Production and Construction Corps
- In office 9 May 2020 – 18 October 2021
- Preceded by: Sun Jinlong
- Succeeded by: Li Yifei

Secretary of the Political and Legal Affairs Commission of Xinjiang
- In office February 2019 – January 2021
- Preceded by: Zhu Hailun
- Succeeded by: Wang Mingshan

Personal details
- Born: 17 May 1963 (age 63) Linyi, Shandong, China
- Party: Chinese Communist Party (1987-)
- Education: Shandong University; Renmin University of China

Wang Junzheng (Chinese: 王君正; pinyin: Wáng Jūnzhèng, born May 1963) is a Chinese politician who served as Party Secretary of Tibet from 2021 to 2026. A member of the 20th Central Committee of the Chinese Communist Party (CCP), he previously served in Xinjiang as head of the regional Political and Legal Affairs Commission, deputy party secretary and party secretary of the Xinjiang Production and Construction Corps (XPCC). Earlier in his career, he worked in the Ministry of Labour and held posts in Yunnan, Hubei and Jilin, including party secretary of Lijiang, Xiangyang and Changchun. Since November 2026, he has been a vice chairman of the National People's Congress Ethnic Affairs Committee.

== Early life and education ==
Wang was born in May 1963 in Linyi, Shandong. In September 1981, he began studying scientific socialism at Shandong University, and in July 1985 he entered the master's program in scientific socialism at the Marxism–Leninism Institute of Renmin University of China. From 1998 to 2006, he studied part-time in the business administration program of the School of Economics and Management at Tsinghua University, where he received a doctorate in management. He joined the CCP in November 1987.

== Career ==
=== Ministry of Labour and Yunnan ===
Wang began work in August 1988 in the general office of the Ministry of Labour, where he rose to be a secretary at deputy division level in the minister's office. In October 1993, he moved to the general office of the Yunnan provincial party committee. He became deputy party secretary of Guandu District in Kunming in September 1994 and its party secretary in June 1995, and he joined the standing committee of the Kunming municipal party committee in October 1998. He then headed Kunming's political and legal affairs commission from December 1998, its organization department from November 2000 and its propaganda department from November 2003, and he became a deputy party secretary of the city in October 2003. In January 2005, he was appointed vice president of the Yunnan Provincial Higher People's Court. He became acting mayor of Lijiang in June 2007, mayor that November and the city's party secretary in December 2009.

=== Hubei and Jilin ===
In September 2012, Wang was appointed vice governor of Hubei. In May 2013, he also became party secretary of Xiangyang. In July 2013, he joined the standing committee of the Hubei provincial party committee, and he gave up the vice-governorship in August 2013. From September 2013, he was also chairman of the standing committee of the Xiangyang Municipal People's Congress.

In January 2016, Wang was transferred to Jilin as a member of the provincial party standing committee and party secretary of the provincial capital, Changchun. He was elected an alternate member of the 19th Central Committee. In July 2018, the Changchun drugmaker Changsheng was found to have produced rabies vaccines in violation of regulations, and Xi Jinping ordered a thorough investigation with strict accountability. In August 2018, the Politburo Standing Committee ordered the Jilin provincial party committee and government to make an in-depth self-criticism, and the mayor of Changchun, Liu Changlong, was required to resign. Wang was not among the officials named for punishment.

=== Xinjiang ===
In February 2019, Wang was transferred to Xinjiang as a member of the regional party standing committee and secretary of its Political and Legal Affairs Commission, which made him the region's security chief. In April 2020, he was promoted to deputy party secretary of Xinjiang and party secretary of the Xinjiang Production and Construction Corps. He later also became the corps' political commissar and chairman of the China Xinjian Group. He kept the political and legal affairs post until September 2020, when Wang Mingshan succeeded him. In a July 2021 article in People's Weekly, written as party secretary of the XPCC, Wang described the corps as an important strategic force for governing the border region. He wrote that it should act as a "stabilizer" for securing the border and consolidating Xinjiang, maintain strict party leadership and promote ethnic unity.

=== Tibet ===
On 19 October 2021, Wang was appointed party secretary of the Tibet Autonomous Region, succeeding Wu Yingjie. The South China Morning Post wrote that the promotion underlined Beijing's snub of the Western response to its policies in Xinjiang. The International Campaign for Tibet said the appointment showed that Beijing intended "to continue using an iron fist to control the Tibetan people", and Representative Jim McGovern, chairman of the Congressional-Executive Commission on China, said he was deeply worried by the promotion. In a speech in Lhasa reported by state media, Wang said he would "consider myself a Tibetan from now onwards", and he pledged to strike against separatism and to promote the "Sinicization of the Tibetan Buddhism". In October 2022, he was elected a full member of the 20th Central Committee.

In November 2023, Wang and the regional chairman, Yan Jinhai, toured South and Southeast Asia, with Wang spending ten days in Nepal, Sri Lanka and Singapore. In Nepal, he met Prime Minister Pushpa Kamal Dahal on 9 November to discuss trade, connectivity, tourism and people-to-people relations. He said the visit focused on carrying out agreements reached during Dahal's visit to China and Xi Jinping's 2019 visit to Nepal, and he also visited Pokhara, where officials of Gandaki Province asked for direct flights from Lhasa, Chengdu and Guangzhou. Tibet scholar Robert Barnett suggested that such trips might form part of Beijing's effort to win support from Buddhists in the region over the succession of the Dalai Lama. In an article in the autumn 2025 issue of Foreign Affairs Journal marking the region's 60th anniversary, Wang described Tibet's transformation since the end of what he called the feudal serf system. He stated that freedom of religious belief had been effectively safeguarded and that the region had leapt across a thousand years in a few decades.

In a March 2026 article published by Xinhua, Wang wrote that the party's priorities in Tibet were stability, development, ecology and strengthening the border. He stated that Tibetan Buddhism was increasingly adapting to socialist society and that all development work should serve to uphold national unity and oppose separatism. He also called the border areas the "first line of defense" of national sovereignty and urged border residents to act as guardians of the country's territory. On 22 September 2026, he was succeeded as party secretary by Hu Changsheng.

=== National People's Congress ===
On 6 November 2026, the Standing Committee of the 14th National People's Congress appointed Wang a vice chairman of its Ethnic Affairs Committee.

== Sanctions ==
On 22 March 2021, the United States, the European Union, the United Kingdom and Canada announced coordinated sanctions against Wang and other officials in Xinjiang.

The United States Department of the Treasury said that because of their roles, Wang and Chen Mingguo, director of the Xinjiang Public Security Bureau, were connected to serious human rights abuses against ethnic minorities in Xinjiang, which reportedly included arbitrary detention and severe physical abuse. The European Union held him responsible for serious human rights violations against Uyghurs and other Muslim minorities, including large-scale arbitrary detention, and cited the XPCC's "systematic use of Uyghurs and people from other Muslim ethnic minorities as a forced workforce". The EU measures froze his assets in the bloc and banned him from travel there. The Chinese government rejected the sanctions and retaliated against European individuals and entities.

Government offices
Preceded by Zhang Zulin	Mayor of Lijiang; 2007–2009	Succeeded by He Lianghui
Party political offices
Preceded by He Zixing	Party Secretary of Lijiang; 2009–2012	Succeeded by Luo Jie
Preceded by Fan Ruiping	Party Secretary of Xiangyang; 2013–2016	Succeeded by Ren Zhenhe
Previous: Gao Guangbin	Party Secretary of Changchun; 2016 – 2019	Succeeded by Wang Kai
Preceded by Zhu Hailun	Secretary of the Political and Legal Affairs Commission of Xinjiang; 2019-2021	Succeeded by Wang Mingshan
Preceded by Sun Jinlong	Party Secretary of Xinjiang Production and Construction Corps; 2020–2021	Succeeded by Li Yifei
Preceded by Wu Yingjie	Party Secretary of Tibet; 2021–2026	Succeeded by Hu Changsheng
