= Hu Changsheng =

Chinese politician

- 胡昌升
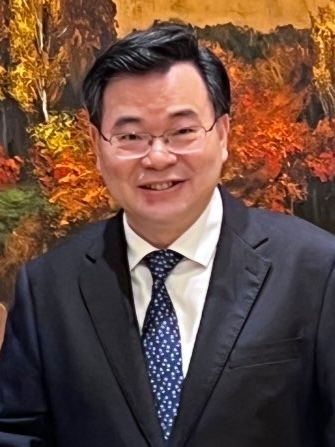
- Hu in 2024

Party Secretary of Tibet
- Incumbent
- Assumed office 22 September 2026
- Deputy: Garma Cedain (chairman)
- Preceded by: Wang Junzheng

Party Secretary of Gansu
- In office 7 December 2022 – 22 September 2026
- Deputy: Ren Zhenhe (governor)
- Preceded by: Yin Hong
- Succeeded by: Wu Xiaojun

Chairman of the Standing Committee of the Gansu Provincial People's Congress
- Incumbent
- Assumed office January 2023
- Preceded by: Yin Hong

Governor of Heilongjiang
- In office 22 February 2021 – December 2022
- Preceded by: Wang Wentao
- Succeeded by: Liang Huiling

Personal details
- Born: December 1963 (age 62) Gao'an, Jiangxi, China
- Party: Chinese Communist Party (1986-)
- Education: Chengdu University of Technology; Shandong University

Hu Changsheng (Chinese: 胡昌升; pinyin: Hú Chāngshēng; born December 1963) is a Chinese politician currently serving as Party Secretary of Tibet since September 2026. He joined the Chinese Communist Party (CCP) in January 1986, and entered the workforce in July of that same year. He is an alternate member of the 19th CCP Central Committee.

He was a delegate to the 18th National Congress of the Chinese Communist Party and is a delegate to the 19th National Congress of the Chinese Communist Party. He was a delegate to the 11th National People's Congress and is a delegate to the 13th National People's Congress

== Early life and education ==
Hu was born in Gao'an, Jiangxi, in December 1963. In September 1982, he entered the Chengdu College of Geology (now Chengdu University of Technology), where he studied geological and mineral survey until 1986. He joined the Chinese Communist Party (CCP) in January 1986. In July 1986, he began working at the college as a teacher in its department of geological and mineral survey, where he was also deputy secretary and then secretary of the Communist Youth League general branch. He went on to hold a series of party branch posts at the college until 2002.

From September 2000 to December 2003, he studied ancient Chinese history as a postgraduate at Shandong University, where he earned a doctorate in history. He holds the academic rank of associate professor.

== Career ==
=== Sichuan ===
From December 1998 to November 2002, Hu was seconded to serve as deputy head of Jinjiang District in Chengdu, the capital of Sichuan. In November 2002, he became the CCP secretary of Yingjing County, and from January 2003 he was also chairman of the standing committee of the county's people's congress. In February 2004, he became a member of the standing committee of the CCP Ya'an Municipal Committee and head of its organization department. From October 2005, he also served as party secretary of Hanyuan County.

In November 2006, he was appointed deputy party secretary and acting mayor of Suining, and he became mayor in February 2007. In February 2012, he left Suining to become deputy party secretary of the Garzê Tibetan Autonomous Prefecture. In April 2012, he was promoted to party secretary of the prefecture, a post he held until June 2015.

=== Qinghai and Fujian ===
In June 2015, Hu was transferred to Qinghai, where he became a member of the standing committee of the CCP Qinghai Provincial Committee and head of its organization department. In July 2017, he was moved to Fujian to take up the same two posts there. He also served as principal of the provincial party school. According to The Beijing News, he gave lectures at Tsinghua University, Peking University and Renmin University in 2017 to recruit talent for Fujian. In October 2017, he was named an alternate member of the 19th Central Committee of the CCP.

On 26 February 2019, the party secretary of Fujian, Yu Weiguo, announced at a meeting of Xiamen's leading officials that the Central Committee had approved Hu's appointment as party secretary of the city. He succeeded Pei Jinjia, who had become a deputy director of the Taiwan Affairs Office in November 2018. In September 2020, Hu was promoted to deputy party secretary of Fujian, and he kept his post in Xiamen.

=== Heilongjiang ===
In January 2021, Hu was transferred to Heilongjiang in Northeast China as the province's deputy party secretary. On 22 February 2021, he was elected governor of Heilongjiang at the fifth session of the 13th Heilongjiang Provincial People's Congress. He served as governor until 2022.

=== Gansu ===
In October 2022, Hu was elected a full member of the 20th Central Committee. On 7 December 2022, he was appointed party secretary of Gansu, succeeding Yin Hong. By January 2023, he was also chairman of the standing committee of the Gansu Provincial People's Congress.

After the 2023 Jishishan earthquake, a magnitude 6.2 earthquake that struck shortly before midnight on 18 December 2023 and killed more than 100 people in Gansu and Qinghai, Hu and the governor of Gansu, Ren Zhenhe, went to the disaster area to direct rescue and relief work.

On 21 June 2025, Hu met former president of Taiwan Ma Ying-jeou, who was visiting Gansu. Ma, a former chairman of the Kuomintang, was leading a delegation of Taiwanese students to the annual ceremony in honor of Fuxi in Tianshui. At the meeting, Hu proposed to further deepen cooperation and exchanges between Gansu and Taiwan.

On 2 September 2026, Hu presided over a session of the Standing Committee of the Provincial People's Congress, which accepted Ren Zhenhe's resignation as governor and appointed Kong Shaoxun as acting governor.

=== Tibet ===
On 22 September 2026, Hu was appointed party secretary of the Tibet Autonomous Region, succeeding Wang Junzheng. According to the state news agency Xinhua, Wang left the post because of his age, after five years in Tibet. Wang had been sanctioned by the United States in 2021 over alleged serious human rights abuses in Xinjiang. In the same reshuffle, the party secretary of Qinghai, Wu Xiaojun, replaced Hu in Gansu, and the governor of Qinghai, Luo Dongchuan, was promoted to party secretary of Qinghai. Reuters reported that the changes came ahead of a key party meeting in October 2026 and the 21st National Congress of the CCP, which was expected in late 2027.

In a speech in Lhasa, Hu pledged to "remain unswervingly and absolutely loyal to the party". He also vowed to intensify the struggle against separatism and to strengthen the management of religious affairs under the rule of law. On 29 September 2026, the Gansu Provincial People's Congress elected Wu Xiaojun as chairman of its standing committee, the post that Hu had held alongside the provincial party secretaryship.

Government offices
Preceded by Ren Yongchang	Mayor of Suining; 2006–2012	Succeeded by He Huazhang
Preceded by Wang Wentao	Governor of Heilongjiang; 2021–2022	Succeeded by Liang Huiling
Party political offices
Preceded by Liu Daoping	Party Secretary of Garzê Tibetan Autonomous Prefecture; 2012–2015	Succeeded by Liu Chengming
Preceded by Wang Lingjun	Head of the Organization Department of Qinghai Provincial Committee of the Chinese Communist Party; 2015–2017	Succeeded by Wang Yuyan
Preceded by Wang Ning	Head of the Organization Department of Fujian Provincial Committee of the Chinese Communist Party; 2017–2019	Succeeded by Yang Xianjin
Preceded by Pei Jinjia	Party Secretary of Xiamen; 2019–2021	Succeeded by Zhao Long
Preceded by Wang Ning	Deputy Party Secretary of Fujian; 2020–2021	Succeeded by Luo Dongchuan
Preceded by Yin Hong	Party Secretary of Gansu; 2022–2026	Succeeded by Wu Xiaojun
Preceded by Wang Junzheng	Party Secretary of Tibet; 2026–	Incumbent
