= Wu Yingjie =

Chinese politician

- 吴英杰
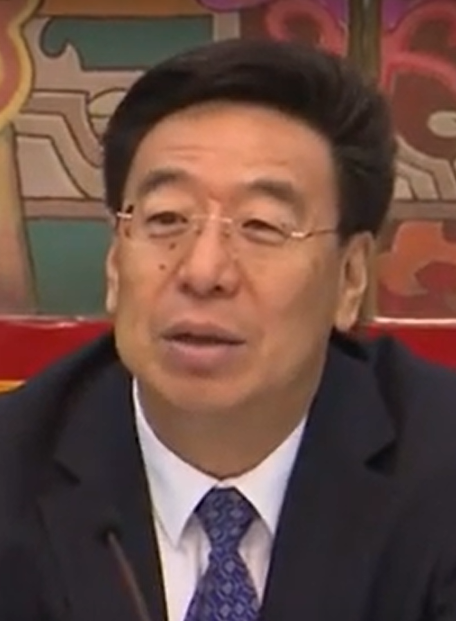
- Wu in 2019

Party Secretary of Tibet
- In office 28 August 2016 – 18 October 2021
- Deputy: Losang Jamcan; Che Dalha (chairman)
- Preceded by: Chen Quanguo
- Succeeded by: Wang Junzheng

Personal details
- Born: December 1956 (age 69) Changyi County, Shandong, China
- Party: Chinese Communist Party (expelled in 2024)
- Education: Tibet Minzu University

Chinese name
- Simplified Chinese: 吴英杰
- Traditional Chinese: 吳英傑
Transcriptions
Standard Mandarin
- Hanyu Pinyin: Wú Yīngjié

Wu Yingjie (Chinese: 吴英杰; born December 1956) is a Chinese politician based in Tibet who formerly served as Party Secretary of Tibet, the top official in Tibet. Originally from Shandong province, Wu grew up in Tibet and worked for his entire career in the region. He became Deputy Party Secretary of Tibet in 2011 and served in the post for nearly five years before being elevated to party chief.

== Biography ==
Wu was born in Changyi County, Shandong province. His father received a job assignment in the Tibetan Plateau when he was just one year old, so he moved to the region with his family. He arrived in Nyingchi in October 1974 as a rusticated youth during the Cultural Revolution. Wu is a graduate of the Tibet Minzu University and took part in leadership education at the Central Party School of the Chinese Communist Party. In 1977 he began working for a power generation station in the western suburbs of Lhasa. In August 1983 he joined the Tibet Autonomous Region's department of education. He would work in education for the next two decades. In 1987 he began overseeing elementary and secondary education as a regional bureaucrat. In 1990, he was put in charge of accepting donations of educational resources from other parts of the country. In 1994 he joined the Autonomous Region Education Commission, rising to deputy secretary in May 1998. In March 2000 he was named deputy head of the education department, then promoted to head in 2000.

In January 2003, Wu was named Vice Chairman of the Tibet Autonomous Region; in June 2005 he took on the regional propaganda portfolio, and joined the regional party standing committee next month. In November 2006 he became Executive Vice Chairman of the Tibet Autonomous Region.

In November 2011 he was named deputy regional party chief. In April 2013 he was named executive deputy party chief. In August 2016, he became the Party Secretary of the Tibet Autonomous Region. Wu leaped directly from the deputy party chief position into the office of the party secretary, breaking a tradition that TAR party chiefs would be appointed from other regions in China.

On 23 October 2021, he was appointed vice chairperson of the National People's Congress Education, Science, Culture and Public Health Committee. In March 2023, Wu was elected as a member of the Standing Committee of the 14th National Committee of the Chinese People's Political Consultative Conference and director of the committee on culture, historical data and studies.

=== Sanctions ===
In December 2022, the United States Department of the Treasury sanctioned Wu under the Global Magnitsky Act for human rights abuses in Tibet.

On December 11, 2024, on International Human Rights Day, Minister of Foreign Affairs of Canada Mélanie Joly announced Canada's sanctions against Wu and seven other government officials of Xinjiang and Tibet involved in serious human rights violations.

=== Downfall ===
On 16 June 2024, Wu was suspected of "serious violations of laws and regulations" by the Central Commission for Discipline Inspection (CCDI), the party's internal disciplinary body, and the National Supervisory Commission, the highest anti-corruption agency of China. On July 24, the Eighth Session of the Standing Committee of the 14th National Committee of the Chinese People's Political Consultative Conference made the decision to remove Wu as a member of the committee and as director of the committee on culture, historical data and studies. He was expelled from the Communist Party after an investigation conducted against him revealed that he failed to implement the 'party's policies' and meddled in local projects for personal gain. On December 24, the Supreme People's Procuratorate announced his arrest.

In March 2025, Wu was charged with bribery by the Third Intermediate People's Court in Beijing and on March 20, his trial began publicly at the same court. Prosecutors alleged that from June 2006 to February 2021, Wu used his position to help certain entities and individuals with project contracts and business operations, illegally accepting over ¥343 million in bribes. Wu pleaded guilty and expressed remorse in court. On July 16, the court sentenced him to death with a two-year reprieve, stripped him of political rights for life and confiscated all his personal property.

Government offices
Preceded by ?	Director of Education Department of Tibet Autonomous Region; 2000–2003	Succeeded by Song Heping
Preceded by Yang Song	Executive Vice Chairman of Tibet; 2006–2013	Succeeded by Deng Xiaogang
Party political offices
Preceded by Gou Tianlin	Head of the Publicity Department of the Tibet Autonomous Region Committee of the Chinese Communist Party; 2005–2006	Succeeded by Cui Yuying
Preceded by Qiangba Puncog	Deputy Party Secretary of Tibet; 2013–2016	Succeeded by Deng Xiaogang
Preceded by Chen Quanguo	Party Secretary of Tibet; 2016–2021	Succeeded by Wang Junzheng
