= Xizang Minzu University =

University in Xianyang, Shaanxi, China

Coordinates: 34°20′48″N 108°43′57″E

- 西藏民族大学 བོད་ལྗོངས་མི་རིགས་སློབ་གྲྭ་ཆེན་མོ་།
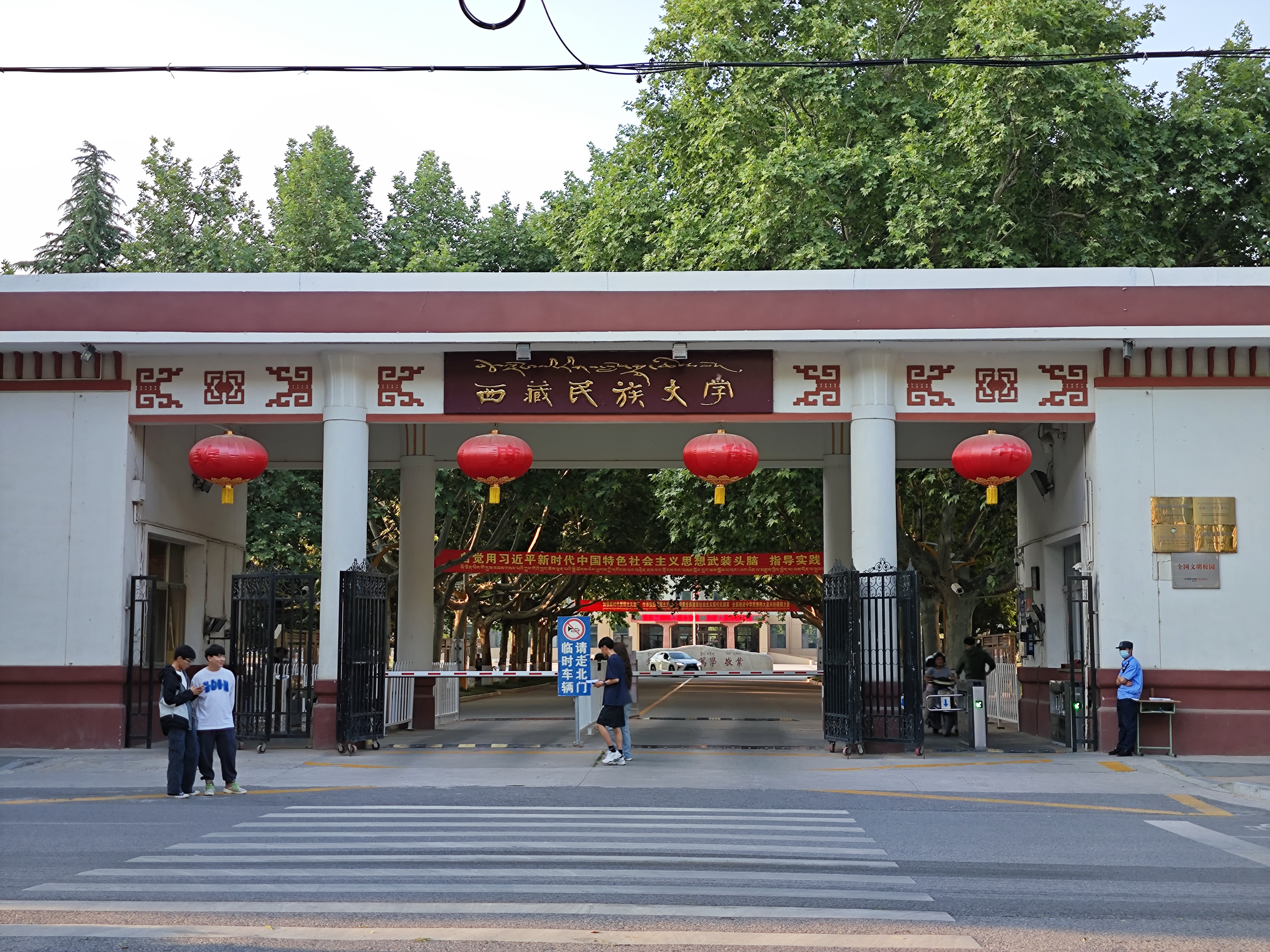
- Former name: Tibet Public School
- Type: Public
- Established: 1958; 68 years ago
- Faculty: 1,105
- Students: 9,400
- Location: Xianyang, Shaanxi, China
- Website: www.xzmu.edu.cn

Xizang Minzu University (Chinese: 西藏民族大学; Tibetan: བོད་ལྗོངས་མི་རིགས་སློབ་གྲྭ་ཆེན་མོ་།), also known as Tibet University for Nationalities, is a Chinese university established to educate ethnic minorities, specifically Tibetans. It is under the jurisdiction of Tibet Autonomous Region, but is physically located in the city of Xianyang in Shaanxi province, near the provincial capital Xi'an.

== History ==
With the annexation of Tibet in 1951, there was an urgent need for a large number of ethnic minority cadres with a certain cultural foundation. According to the instruction of Premier Zhou Enlai, Deng Xiaoping presided over a meeting of the Secretariat of the Central Committee, and decided to set up Tibetan schools. In June 1957, the Tibet Work Committee began to prepare for the establishment of the Tibet Public School. However, the repeated obstruction of the Kashag class in Tibet did not agree to open a public school in Tibet. The Kashag government claimed that even after graduation, students would continue to be serfs or slaves. Considering the urgent need for a safe place for students' development, the Tibetan Work Committee decided to run the school in Xianyang, Shaanxi, which has trains to Beijing and Xining, and was convenient for students to return to Tibet to work after graduation.

In October 1957, the Central Committee approved the allocation of the site of the former Northwestern Polytechnical College in Xianyang, Shaanxi Province, to the new Tibet Public School. The opening ceremony of the Tibet Public Schools was held ceremonially on September 15, 1958, marking the beginning of a new stage in the historical development of Tibet's national education. The central government formally appointed Zhang Guohua, deputy secretary of the Tibet Work Committee and commander of the Tibet Military Region, as headmaster of the Tibet Public School. In October 1963, the school set up a professional department, and the direction of running the school gradually developed into a professional education and a comprehensive institution. On July 1, 1965, the State Council approved the change of its name to the Xizang Minzu College.

In 1972, the college set up seven specialties and preparatory courses, such as politics, electromechanics, Tibetan language, finance and accounting, animal husbandry and veterinary medicine, and health. In May 1972, the Linzhi Branch was established in Linzhi, Tibet, with departments of agriculture, animal husbandry and veterinary medicine, finance and accounting, and electromechanics. In 1978, approved by the State Council, the Linzhi Branch was renamed the Tibetan College of Agriculture and Animal Husbandry. In 1983, the Tibetan language department of Xizang Minzu College was relocated to the Tibet Normal College. In 1995, the number of majors in the college increased, with the addition of administrative science, secretarial science, archival science, jurisprudence, taxation and preventive medicine.

On April 28, 2015, Xizang Minzu College was renamed Xizang Minzu University with the approval of the Ministry of Education of the People's Republic of China.

== Overview ==
The university has over 9,400 full-time students, more than half of whom are members of ethnic minorities including Tibetans. It has 1,105 faculty members. The university offers 42 undergraduate majors and 20 master's programs.

== Notable alumni ==
- Basang, former vice-chairwoman of Tibet Autonomous Region
- Losang Jamcan, Chairman of Tibet Autonomous Region
- Tashi Tsering, educator
- Wu Yingjie, Communist Party Secretary of the Tibet Autonomous Region
