= Tibet Police Officers Institute =

Coordinates: 29.68854°N 91.1579°E

Tibet Police Officers Institute (西藏警官高等专科学校) is a full-time public provincial college of higher education in the People's Republic of China, located in Chengguan District, Lhasa, Tibet Autonomous Region.

== History ==
In September 1956 (69 years ago), the Tibet Public Security Training Class was established, and in July 1957, it was moved to Beijing and converted into the Tibet Class of the People's Public Security University of China, and in April 1960, it was moved back to Lhasa and converted into the Tibet Autonomous Region Public Security School, and in March 1965, it was renamed as the TAR School of Politics and Law Cadres. In June 1973, it was renamed as the Public Security School of the Public Security Bureau of the TAR, and in December 1974, renamed as the TAR School of Politics and Law Cadres. In May 1978, it was renamed as the Public Security School of the Public Security Bureau of the TAR. In December 1974, it was renamed Tibet Autonomous Region Political and Legal Cadre School; in May 1978, it was renamed Tibet Autonomous Region Public Security Bureau Public Security School. In November 1980, it was renamed Tibet Autonomous Region People's Police School.

On April 16, 2003 (22 years ago), it was upgraded to the Tibet Police Officers Institute.
