= Deng Xiaogang (politician) =

Chinese politician

Deng Xiaogang (Chinese: 邓小刚; born August 1967) is a Chinese politician, serving since 2024 as the vice chairperson of the Committee for Agriculture and Rural Affairs of the National Committee of the Chinese People's Political Consultative Conference. He began his political career in Beijing, then moved to the Tibet Autonomous Region (TAR), where he served as deputy party chief and secretary of its Political and Legal Affairs Commission.

== Biography ==
Deng was born in Guiyang County, Hunan province. He graduated with a degree in animal husbandry from Hunan College of Agriculture (now Hunan Agricultural University), and a graduate degree in development economics from the Beijing Agricultural University (now China Agricultural University). He joined the Chinese Communist Party in December 1991. He worked in the Beijing Planning Commission, the Beijing Development and Reform Commission, and the deputy governor of Fengtai District, and the governor of Tongzhou District.

In 2005, Deng was selected to work in Tibet. In June 2005, he became assistant to the Chairman of the Tibet Autonomous Region, then in 2006 was elevated to Vice Chairman, entering sub-provincial ranks at only age 39. He entered the regional Party Standing Committee in 2011 as the secretary-general of the regional party committee. In April 2012, as part of a wider reshuffle, Deng was named head of the TAR Political and Legal Affairs Commission (Zhengfawei), the youngest provincial-level Zhengfawei chief at the time. In April 2013, he was named Chinese Communist Party Deputy Committee Secretary of the Tibet Autonomous Region. In March 2017, Deng was transferred to Sichuan province to serve as deputy party chief there. At the time of his transfer, Deng, 48, was the youngest provincial-level party chief in the country.

In October 2021, Deng was appointed as the vice minister of the Ministry of Agriculture and Rural Affairs, until October 2024. In October 2024, he was added as an member of the 14th National Committee of the Chinese People's Political Consultative Conference, and also appointed as the vice chairperson of the Committee for Agriculture and Rural Affairs of the National Committee of the Chinese People's Political Consultative Conference.

Party political offices
Preceded by Liu Guozhong	Deputy Party Secretary of Sichuan; 2017–2021	Succeeded by Luo Wen
