= Tibet Autonomous Region =

Autonomous region of China

- Autonomous region

Chinese transcription(s)
  - Simplified Chinese: 西藏自治区
  - Hanyu pinyin: Xīzàng Zìzhìqū
  - Abbreviation: XZ / 藏 (Zàng)

Tibetan transcription(s)
  - Tibetan script: བོད་རང་སྐྱོང་ལྗོངས
  - Tibetan pinyin: Poi Ranggyong Jong
  - Wylie transliteration: bod rang skyong ljongs
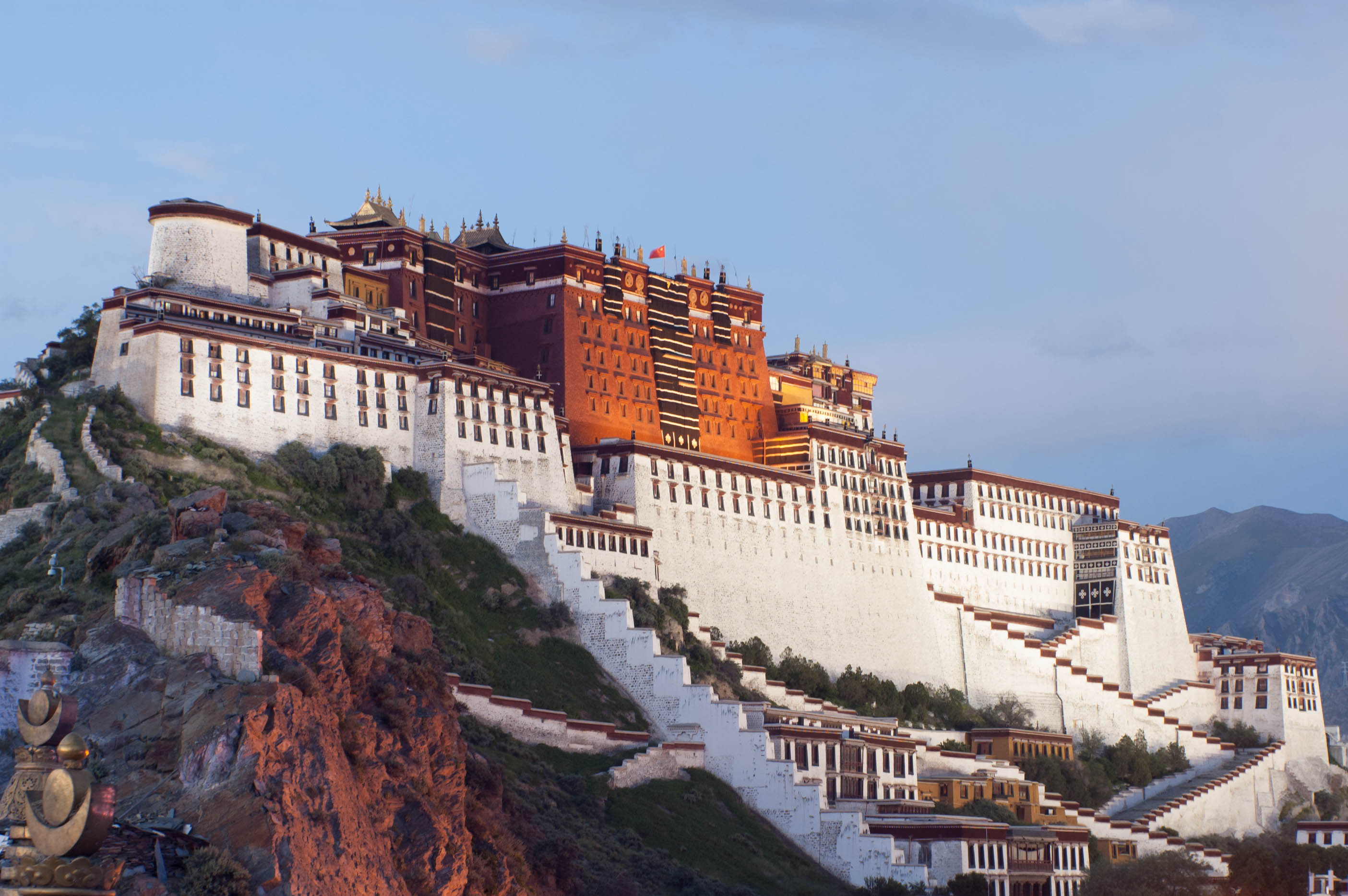
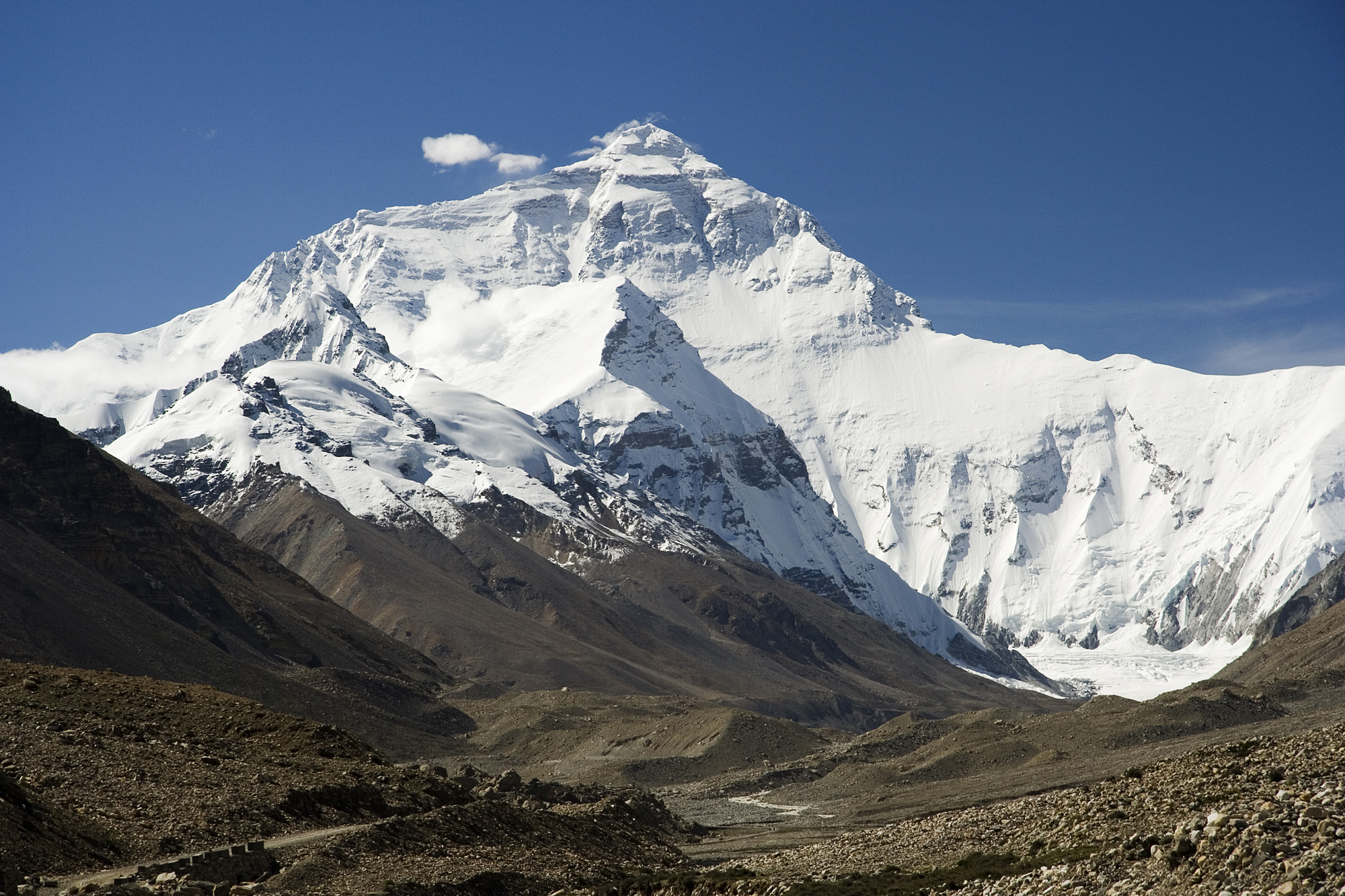
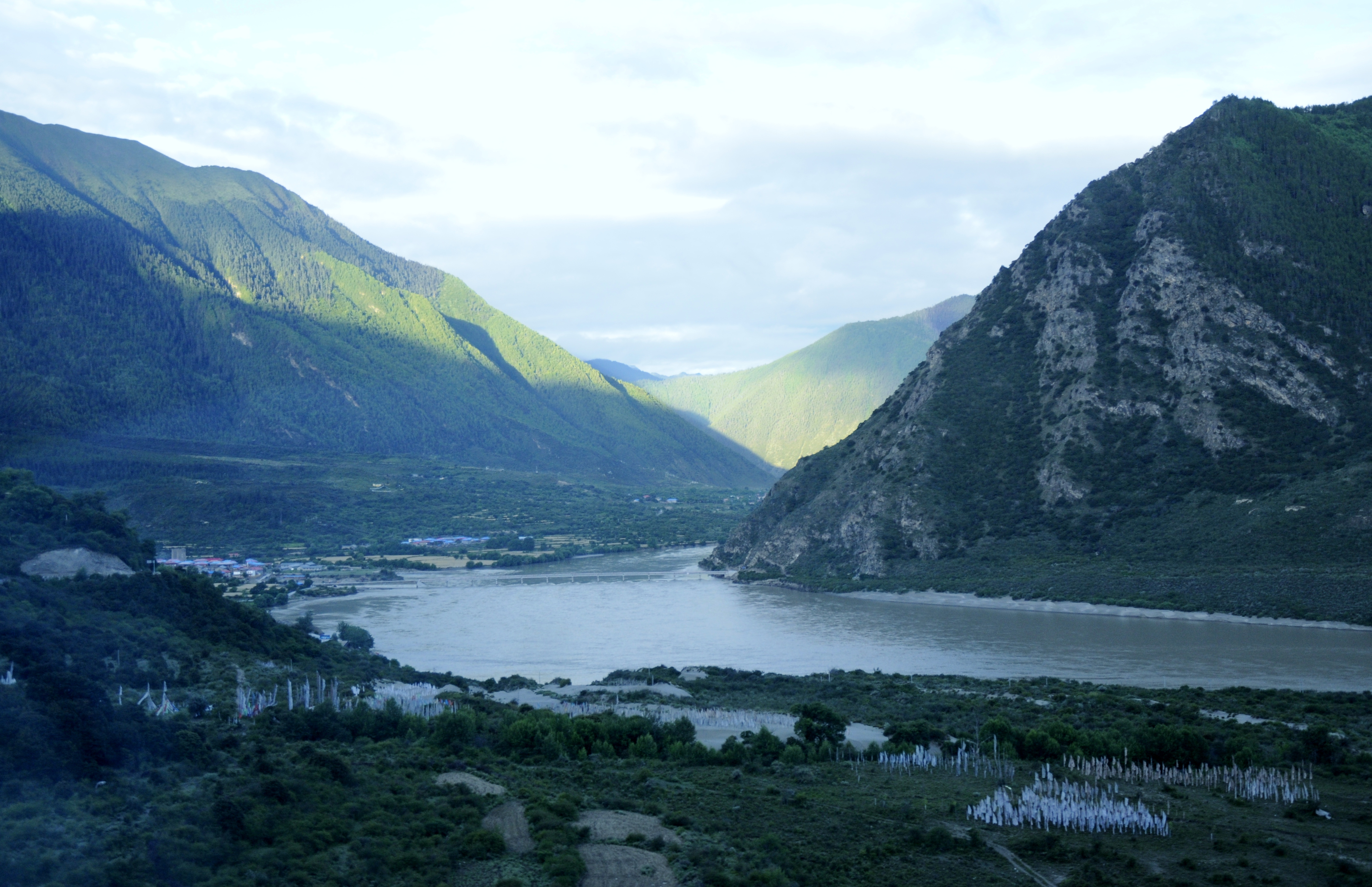
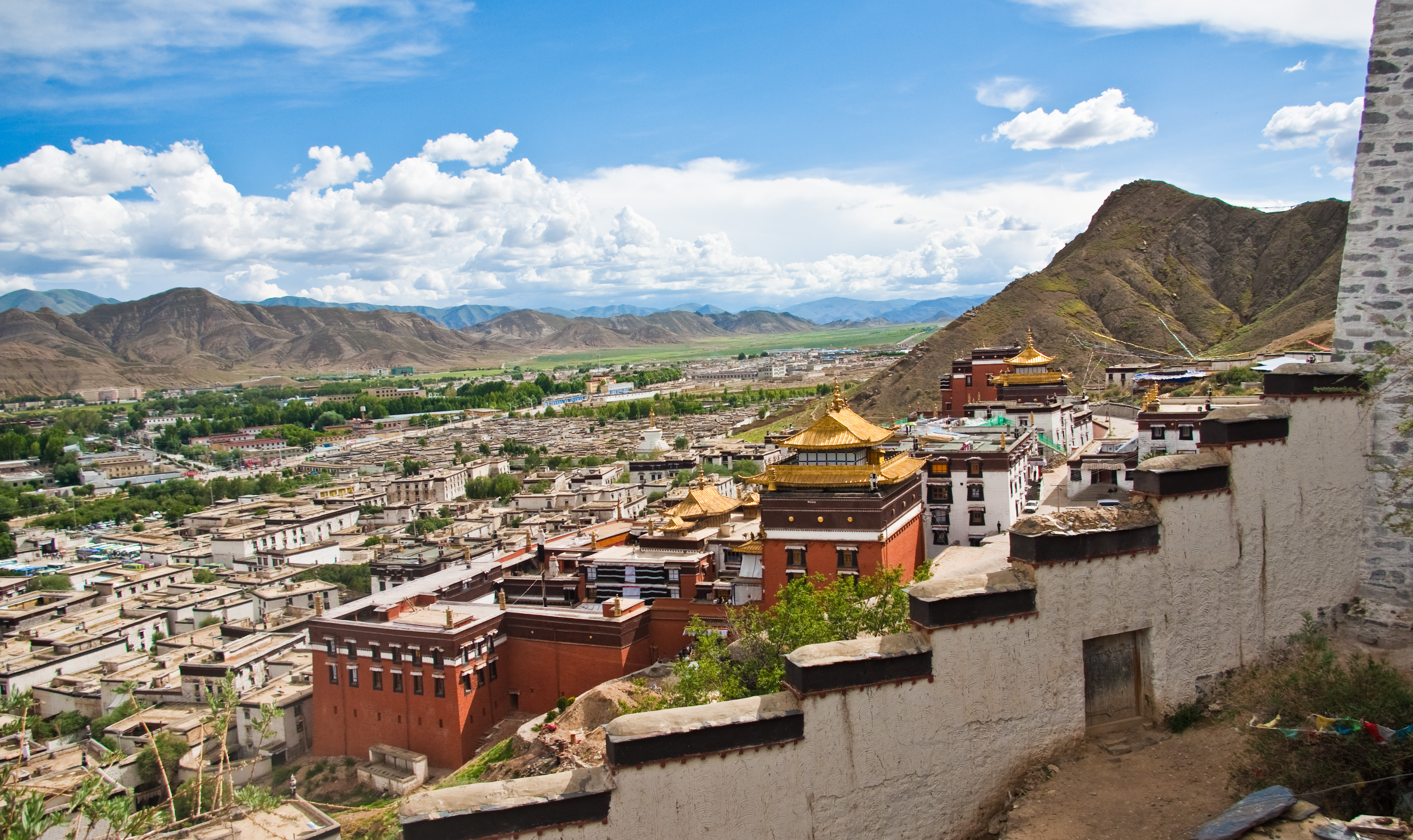
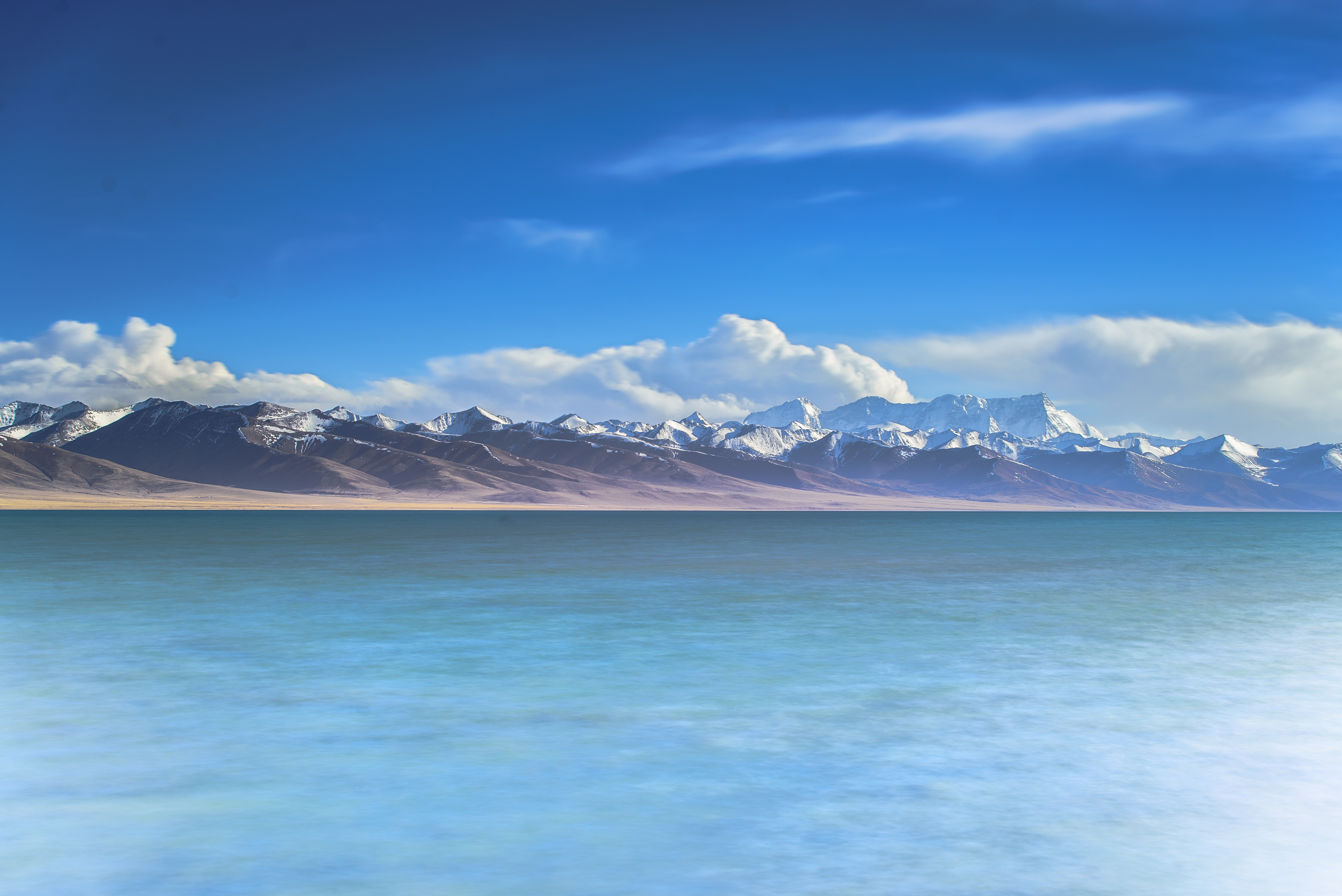
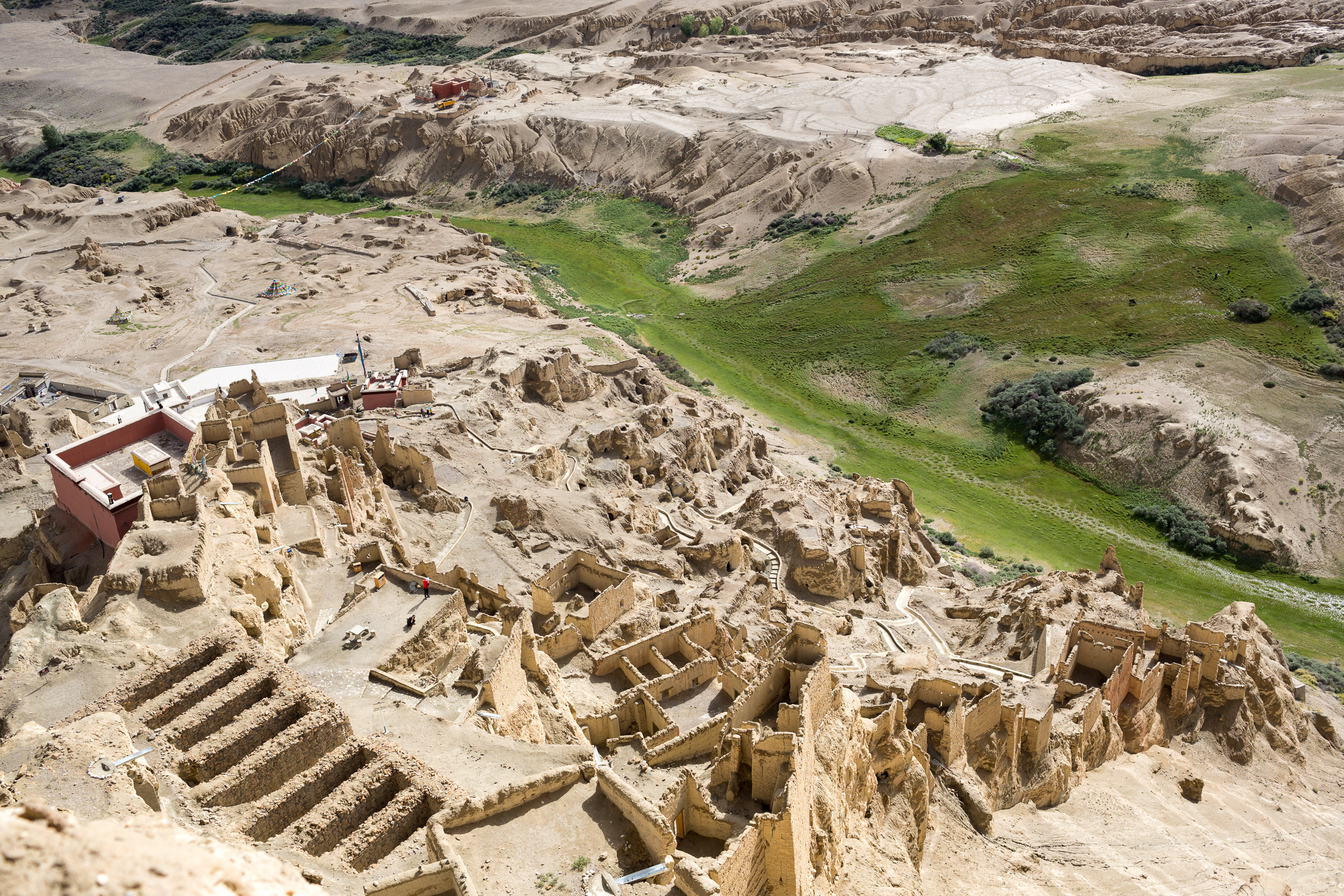
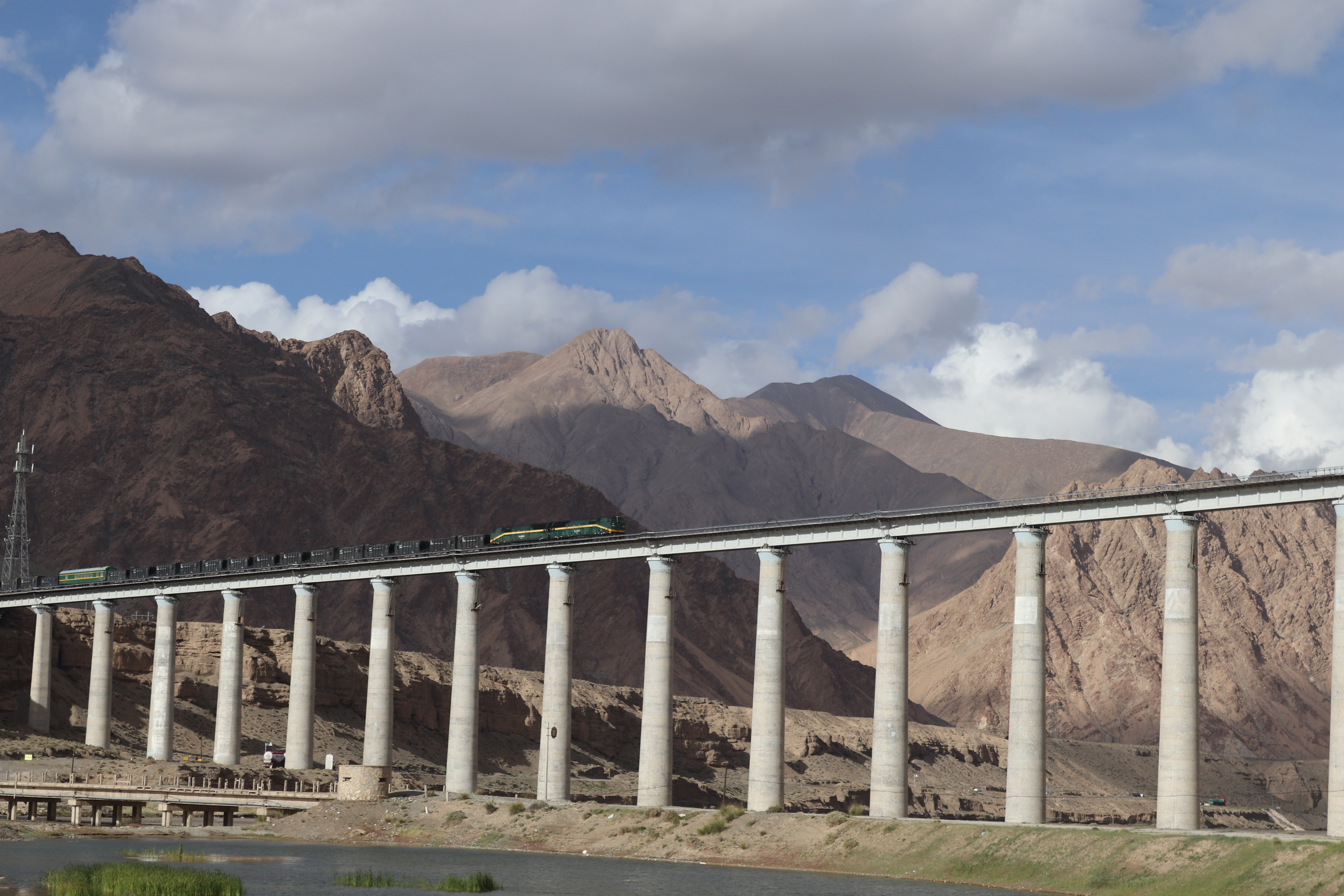
- Potala Palace Mount Everest Yarlung Tsangpo Canyon Shigatse Namtso Tsaparang Qinghai-Tibet Railroad

- Location of the Tibet Autonomous Region in China
- Country: China
- Capital and largest city: Lhasa
- Divisions: Prefecture-level; County-level; Township-; level: 7 prefectures 74 counties 699 towns and subdistricts

Government
  - Type: Autonomous region
  - Body: Tibet Autonomous Region People's Congress
  - Party Secretary: Hu Changsheng
  - Congress Chairman: Yan Jinhai
  - Government Chairman: Garma Cedain
  - Regional CPPCC Chairman: Pagbalha Geleg Namgyai
  - National People's Congress Representation: 24 deputies

Area
  - Total: 1,228,400 km^{2} (474,300 sq mi)
  - Rank: 2nd
- Highest elevation (Mount Everest): 8,848 m (29,029 ft)

Population (2020)
  - Total: 3,648,100
  - Rank: 32nd
  - Density: 2.9698/km^{2} (7.6917/sq mi)
  - Rank: 33rd

Demographics
  - Ethnic composition: 86.0% Tibetan; 12.2% Han; 0.8% others
  - Languages and dialects: Tibetan, Mandarin Chinese

GDP (2025)
  - Total: CN¥ 303.2 billion (31st); US$ 42.446 billion
  - Per capita: CN¥ 81,502 (16th); US$ 11,410
- ISO 3166 code: CN-XZ
- HDI (2023): 0.656 (31st) – medium
- Website: www.xizang.gov.cn (in Chinese)

Tibet
- "Tibet" in Chinese (top) and Tibetan (bottom)

Chinese name
- Chinese: 西藏
- Hanyu Pinyin: Xīzàng
- Literal meaning: "Western Tsang"
Transcriptions
Standard Mandarin
- Hanyu Pinyin: Xīzàng
- Bopomofo: ㄒㄧ ㄗㄤˋ
- Gwoyeu Romatzyh: Shitzanq
- Wade–Giles: Hsi^{1}-tsang^{4}
- Tongyong Pinyin: Sizàng
- Yale Romanization: Syīdzàng
- IPA: [ɕí.tsâŋ]
other Mandarin
- Xiao'erjing: ثِ‌زَانْ
Wu
- Romanization: Si^{平}zaon^{去}
Hakka
- Romanization: Sî-tshông
Yue: Cantonese
- Yale Romanization: Sāi-johng
- Jyutping: sai1 zong6
- IPA: [sɐj˥ tsɔŋ˨]
Southern Min
- Hokkien POJ: Se-chōng
- Teochew Peng'im: Sai-tsăng
Eastern Min
- Fuzhou BUC: Să̤-câung

Tibet Autonomous Region
- Simplified Chinese: 西藏自治区
- Traditional Chinese: 西藏自治區
- Hanyu Pinyin: Xīzàng Zìzhìqū
Transcriptions
Standard Mandarin
- Hanyu Pinyin: Xīzàng Zìzhìqū
- Bopomofo: ㄒㄧ ㄗㄤˋ; ㄗˋ ㄓˋ ㄑㄩ
- Gwoyeu Romatzyh: Shitzanq Tzyhjyhchiu
- Wade–Giles: Hsi^{1}-tsang^{4} Tzu^{4}-chih^{4}-chʻü^{1}
- Tongyong Pinyin: Sizàng Zìhjhìhcyu
- Yale Romanization: Syīdzàng Dz̀jr̀chyū
- IPA: [ɕí.tsâŋ tsɹ̩̂.ʈʂɻ̩̂.tɕʰý]
other Mandarin
- Xiao'erjing: ثِ‌زَانْ زِجِ‌کِیُوِ
Wu
- Romanization: Si^{平}zaon^{去} Zy^{去}zy^{去}chiu^{平}
Hakka
- Romanization: Sî-tshông Tshṳ-tshṳ-khî
Yue: Cantonese
- Jyutping: sai1 zong6 zi6 zi6 keoi1
- IPA: [sɐj˥ tsɔŋ˨ tsi˨ tsi˨ kʰɵɥ˥]
Southern Min
- Hokkien POJ: Se-chōng Chū-tī-khu
- Teochew Peng'im: Sai-tsăng Tsĕu-tī-khu
Eastern Min
- Fuzhou BUC: Să̤-câung Cê̤ṳ-dê-kṳ̆

Tibetan name
- Tibetan: བོད་རང་སྐྱོང་ལྗོངས།
Transcriptions
- Wylie: bod rang skyong ljongs
- Tibetan Pinyin: Poi rang-gyong jong
- Lhasa IPA: [pʰø̀ʔ ʐàŋ.cóŋ tɕòŋ]

Manchu name
- Manchu script: ᠸᠠᡵᡤᡳ ᡩᡯᠠᠩ
- Romanization: wargi Dzang

Mongolian name
- Mongolian: Töbhödiin öörtöö zasakh oron

The Tibet Autonomous Region (TAR), often shortened in English to Tibet and sometimes to Xizang, (Note: Chinese: 西藏; pinyin: Xīzàng; lit. 'Western Tsang'; Tibetan: བོད་, Wylie: bod, ZWPY: Poi, Tibetan pronunciation: [pʰø̀ʔ] "Xizang" has been the Chinese transliteration of Ü-Tsang since the Qing dynasty. Since December 2023, PRC government documents have increasingly used "Xizang" instead of "Tibet" as the English name for the autonomous region, which the United Front Work Department distinguishes from the cultural "Greater Tibet".) is an autonomous region of the People's Republic of China. It was established in 1965 to replace the Tibet Area, a former administrative division of the Republic of China.

The current borders of the Tibet Autonomous Region were generally established in the 18th century and include about half of cultural Tibet, which was at times independent and at times under the Mongol-led Yuan dynasty or Qing dynasty rule. The TAR spans more than 1,200,000 km^{2} (460,000 sq mi) and is the second-largest province-level division of China by area. It has a harsh and rugged terrain, with a population of 3.6 million people or approximately 3 inhabitants per square kilometre (7.8/sq mi).

== Names ==
Zang and Xizang are exonyms used in Chinese. The shorter form, Zang, is an ethnonym that refers broadly to Tibet or Tibetan culture, whereas Xizang is the geopolitical variation that means literally "Western Zang" and is the official Chinese name for the TAR. The official use of Xizang in Chinese records dates back to 1724 when the Kangxi Emperor of Qing dynasty wrote an edict for the Imperial Stele Inscriptions of the Pacification of Tibet in languages such as Han, Manchu, Mongolian, and Tibetan. In Hanyu Pinyin, Xizang was the Chinese transliteration of Ü-Tsang during the Manchu-led Qing dynasty, although Ü-Tsang is not geographically equal to the TAR. The word Thibet, as used in the Western world, dates back to 1827 and may have been derived from older terms in other languages.

== History ==
In the 6th century, the 32nd Tibetan king of Yarlung dynasty, Namri Songtsen, began to annex neighboring tribes; he was later assassinated by a coup, and his son Songtsen Gampo succeeded him and quelled rebellions in various regions, founding the Tibetan Empire in 618. Songtsen Gampo inherited his father's will and successively conquered and annexed other kingdoms such as "Songbo" in the Yushu area of Qinghai, Sumpa in the west, "Kangguo" (called "Dongnwu Kingdom" in the Old Book of Tang) in Qianduo (now Chamdo), "Fuguo (Chinese: 附国)" in Ganzi, "Fanlu (Chinese: 蕃绿)" in Litang, and Tuyuhun in Qinghai. Songtsen Gampo led a large army to attack Zhangzhung in 642. After three years of war, Zhangzhung became a vassal state with General Khyungpo Pungse Sutse as its governor.

By the end of the 8th century, the Tibetan Empire reached its greatest extent. After a civil war, the empire broke up in 842. The Era of Fragmentation was characterised by small kingdoms such as Guge and Maryul. The Mongols conquered Tibet in 1244 and ruled it under the Yuan dynasty (see Tibet under Yuan rule) but granted the region a degree of political autonomy. The Sakya lama Drogön Chögyal Phagpa became a religious teacher to Kublai Khan in the 1250s and was made the head of the Tibetan region administration c. 1264, known as Imperial Preceptor.

From 1354 to 1642, central Tibet (Ü-Tsang) was ruled by a succession of dynasties from Nêdong, Shigatse and Lhasa. In 1642, the Ganden Phodrang court of the 5th Dalai Lama was established by Güshi Khan of the Khoshut Khanate, who was enthroned as king of Tibet. The Khoshuts ruled until 1717, when they were overthrown by the Dzungar Khanate. Despite politically charged historical debate concerning the nature of Sino-Tibetan relations, some historians posit that Tibet under the Ganden Phodrang (1642–1951) was an independent state, albeit under various foreign suzerainties for much of this period, including by the Ming dynasty (1368–1644). The Dzungar forces were in turn expelled by the 1720 Chinese expedition to Tibet during the Dzungar–Qing Wars. This began a period of Manchu-led Qing rule over Tibet.

From the fall of the Qing dynasty in 1912 until 1950, Tibet was de facto independent although still claimed by the successor Republic of China. The republican regime, preoccupied with warlordism (1916–1928), civil war (1927–1949) and Japanese invasion (1937–1945), was not able to exert authority in central Tibet. Other regions of ethno-cultural Tibet in eastern Kham and Amdo had been under de jure administration of the Chinese dynastic government since the mid-18th century; they form parts of the provinces of Qinghai, Gansu, Sichuan and Yunnan.

In 1950, following the proclamation of the People's Republic of China the year before, the People's Liberation Army (PLA) defeated the Tibetan army near Chamdo. In 1951, Tibetan representatives signed the Seventeen Point Agreement with the Central People's Government affirming its sovereignty over Tibet and the annexation of Tibet by the People's Republic of China. The 14th Dalai Lama ratified the agreement in October 1951. Despite the agreement, relations between the Tibetan and Chinese governments deteriorated, and on March 10, 1959, Tibetans in Lhasa launched an uprising, which ultimately failed, but the date continues to be marked as Tibetan Uprising Day each year by Tibetan exiles. The 14th Dalai Lama fled to India and renounced the Seventeen Point Agreement, stating he had approved it under duress. During the 1950s and 1960s, CIA-trained Tibetan agents were parachuted into Tibet to fight the PLA, but almost all of them were captured and killed. The establishment of the Tibet Autonomous Region in 1965 made Tibet a provincial-level division of China with a relatively higher degree of autonomy than regular provinces.

== Geography ==
The Tibet Autonomous Region is located on the Tibetan Plateau, the highest region on Earth. In northern Tibet, elevations reach an average of over 4,572 metres (15,000 ft). Mount Everest is located on Tibet's border with Nepal.

China's provincial-level areas of Xinjiang, Qinghai and Sichuan lie to the north, northeast and east, respectively, of the TAR. There is also a short border with Yunnan Province to the southeast. The countries to the south and southwest are Nepal, Myanmar, India and Bhutan. China claims most of the Indian state of Arunachal Pradesh as part of the TAR. It also claims some areas adjoining the Chumbi Valley that are recognised as Bhutan's territory, and some areas of eastern Ladakh claimed by India. India and China agreed to respect the Line of Actual Control in a bilateral agreement signed on September 7, 1993.

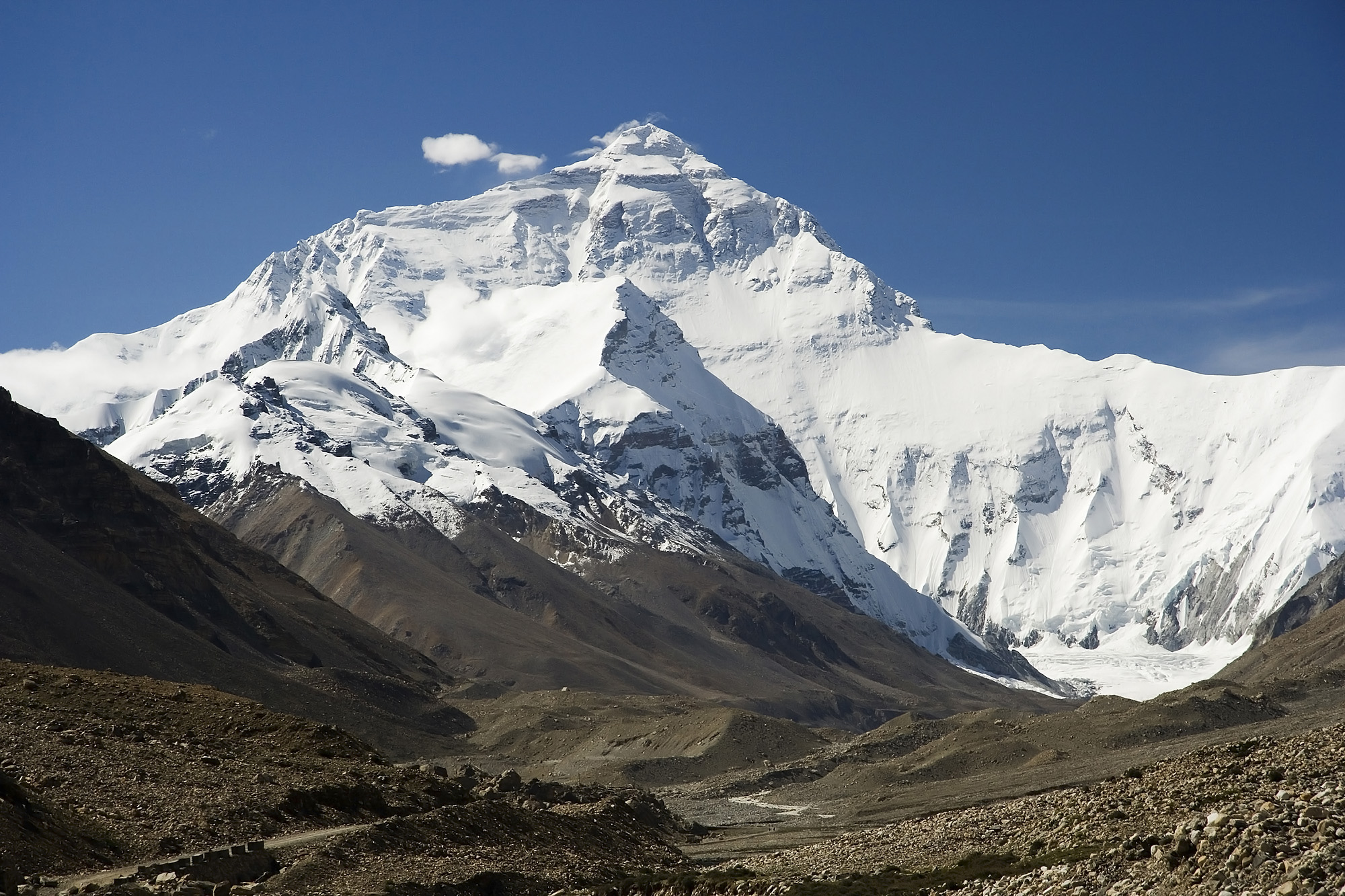
Mount Everest

Physically, the TAR may be divided into two parts: the lakes region in the west and northwest and the river region, which spreads out on three sides of the former on the east, south and west. Both regions receive limited amounts of rainfall as they lie in the rain shadow of the Himalayas; however, the region names are useful in contrasting their hydrological structures, and also in contrasting their different cultural uses: nomadic in the lake region and agricultural in the river region. On the south the TAR is bounded by the Himalayas and on the north by a broad mountain system. The system at no point narrows to a single range; generally there are three or four across its breadth. As a whole the system forms the watershed between rivers flowing to the Indian Ocean—the Indus, Brahmaputra and Salween and its tributaries—and the streams flowing into the undrained salt lakes to the north.

The lake region extends from the Pangong Tso Lake in Ladakh, Lake Rakshastal, Yamdrok Lake and Lake Manasarovar near the source of the Indus River, to the sources of the Salween, the Mekong and the Yangtze. Other lakes include Dagze Co, Namtso, and Pagsum Co. The lake region is a wind-swept alpine grassland. This region is called the Changtang (Byang sang) or 'Northern Plateau' by the people of Tibet. It is 1,100 km (680 mi) broad and covers an area about equal to that of France. Due to its great distance from the ocean it is arid and possesses no river outlet. The mountain ranges are spread out, rounded, disconnected, and separated by relatively flat valleys.

The TAR contains multiple lakes, generally salt or alkaline and intersected by streams. Due to the presence of discontinuous permafrost over the Changtang, the soil is boggy and covered with tussocks of grass, thus resembling the Siberian tundra. Salt and fresh-water lakes are intermingled. The lakes are generally without outlet or have only a small effluent. The deposits consist of soda, potash, borax and salt. The lake region is noted for a vast number of hot springs, which are widely distributed between the Himalayas and 34° N, but are most numerous to the west of Tengri Nor (northwest of Lhasa). So intense is the cold in this part of Tibet that these springs are sometimes represented by columns of ice, the nearly boiling water having frozen in the act of ejection.

The river region is characterized by fertile mountain valleys and includes the Yarlung Tsangpo (the upper courses of the Brahmaputra) and its major tributary, the Nyang River, the Salween, the Yangtze, the Mekong, and the Yellow River. The Yarlung Tsangpo Canyon, formed by a horseshoe bend in the river where it flows around Namcha Barwa, is the deepest and possibly longest canyon in the world. Among the mountains there are many narrow valleys. The valleys of Lhasa, Shigatse, Gyantse and the Brahmaputra are free from permafrost, covered with good soil and groves of trees, well irrigated, and richly cultivated.

The south Tibet valley is formed by the Yarlung Tsangpo River during its middle reaches, where it travels from west to east. The valley is approximately 1,200 km (750 mi) long and 300 km (190 mi) wide. The valley descends from 4,500 m (14,760 ft) above sea level to 2,800 m (9,190 ft). The mountains on either side of the valley are usually around 5,000 m (16,400 ft) high. Lakes here include Lake Paiku and Puma Yumco.

== Politics ==
The Tibet Autonomous Region is a province-level entity of the People's Republic of China. Chinese law nominally guarantees some autonomy in the areas of education and language policy. Like other subdivisions of China, routine administration is carried out by a People's Government, headed by a chairman, who has been an ethnic Tibetan except for an interregnum during the Cultural Revolution. As with other Chinese provinces, the chairman carries out work under the direction of the regional secretary of the Chinese Communist Party. The standing committee of the regional Communist Party Committee serves as the top rung of political power in the region. The current chairman is Garma Cedain and the current party secretary is Wang Junzheng. The central leadership in Beijing formulates policies regarding Tibet through the Central Tibet Work Coordination Group, which is usually led by the chairman of the Chinese People's Political Consultative Conference.

=== Administrative divisions ===
The TAR is divided into seven prefecture-level divisions: six prefecture-level cities and one prefecture.

These in turn are subdivided into a total of 66 counties and 8 districts (Chengguan, Doilungdêqên, Dagzê, Samzhubzê, Karub, Bayi, Nêdong, and Seni).

Administrative divisions of Tibet Autonomous Region
Division code	Division	Area (km^{2})	Population (2020)	Seat	Divisions		
Division code	Division	Area (km^{2})	Population (2020)	Seat	Districts	Counties	CL cities
540000	Tibet Autonomous Region	1,228,400.00	3,648,100	Lhasa city	8	64	2
540100	Lhasa city	29,538.90	867,891	Chengguan District	3	5	
540200	Shigatse / Xigazê city	182,066.26	798,153	Samzhubzê District	1	17	
540300	Chamdo / Qamdo city	108,872.30	760,966	Karuo District	1	10	
540400	Nyingchi city	113,964.79	238,936	Bayi District	1	5	1
540500	Shannan / Lhoka city	79,287.84	354,035	Nêdong District	1	10	1
540600	Nagqu city	391,816.63	504,838	Seni District	1	10	
542500	Ngari Prefecture	296,822.62	123,281	Gar County		7	

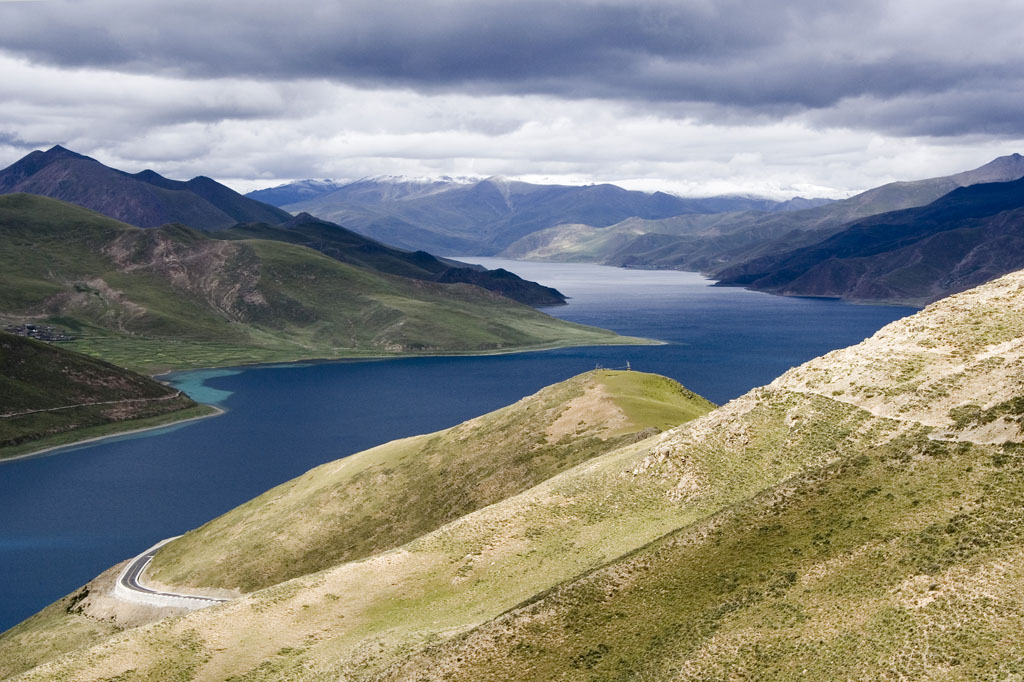
Yamdrok Lake

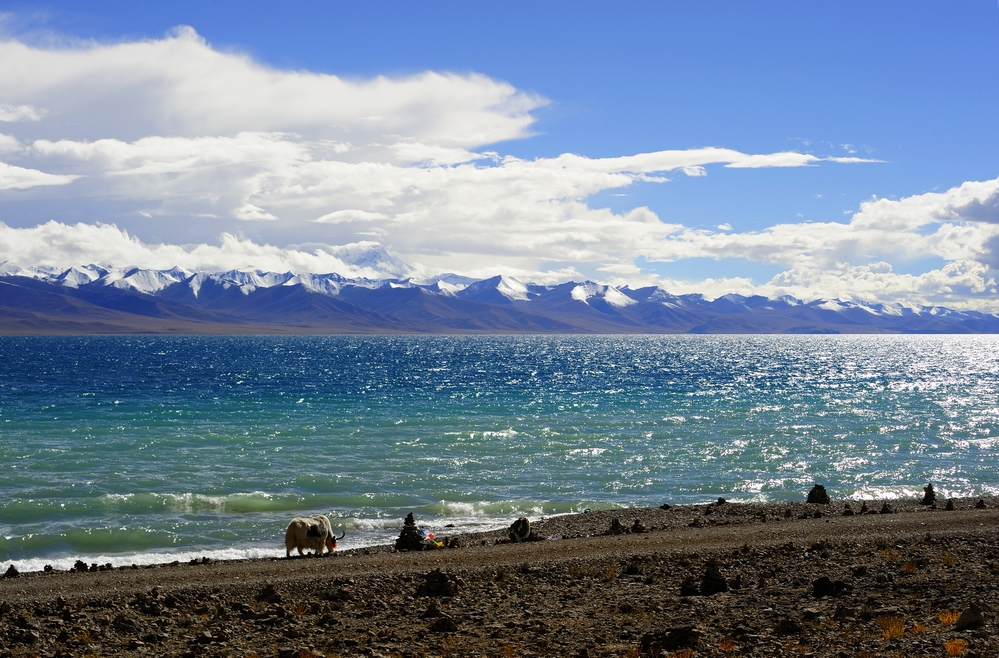
Namtso Lake

Administrative divisions in Tibetan, Chinese, and varieties of romanizations
English	Tibetan	Tibetan Pinyin	Wylie transliteration	Chinese	Pinyin
Tibet Autonomous Region	བོད་རང་སྐྱོང་ལྗོངས།	Poi Ranggyongjong	bod rang skyong ljongs	西藏自治区	Xīzàng Zìzhìqū
Lhasa city	ལྷ་ས་གྲོང་ཁྱེར།	Lhasa Chongkyir	lha sa grong khyer	拉萨市	Lāsà Shì
Xigazê city	གཞིས་ཀ་རྩེ་གྲོང་ཁྱེར།	Xigazê Chongkyir	ggzhis ka rtse grong khyer	日喀则市	Rìkāzé Shì
Qamdo city	ཆབ་མདོ་གྲོང་ཁྱེར།	Qamdo Chongkyir	chab mdo grong khyer	昌都市	Chāngdū Shì
Nyingchi city	ཉིང་ཁྲི་གྲོང་ཁྱེར།	Nyingchi Chongkyir	nying khri grong khyer	林芝市	Línzhī Shì
Shannan city	ལྷོ་ཁ་གྲོང་ཁྱེར།	Lhoka Chongkyir	lho kha grong khyer	山南市	Shānnán Shì
Nagqu city	ནག་ཆུ་གྲོང་ཁྱེར།	Nagqu Chongkyir	nag chu grong khyer	那曲市	Nàqū Shì
Ngari Prefecture	མངའ་རིས་ས་ཁུལ།	Ngari Sakü	mnga' ris sa khul	阿里地区	Ālǐ Dìqū

Population by urban areas of prefecture & county cities
#	Cities	2020 Urban area	2010 Urban area	2020 City proper
1	Lhasa	551,802	199,159 (Note: New districts established after census: Doilungdêqên (Doilungdêqên County), Dagzê (Dagzê County). These new districts not included in the urban area & district area count of the pre-expanded city.)	867,891
2	Xigazê	94,464	63,967 (Note: Xigazê Prefecture is currently known as Xigazê PLC after census; Xigazê CLC is currently known as Samzhubzê after 2010 census.)	798,153
3	Nyingchi	60,696	(Note: Nyingchi Prefecture is currently known as Nyingchi PLC after census; Nyingchi County is currently known as Bayi after 2010 census.)	238,936
4	Shannan	54,188	(Note: Shannan Prefecture is currently known as Shannan PLC after census; Nêdong County is currently known as Nêdong after census.)	354,035
5	Qamdo	50,127	(Note: Qamdo Prefecture is currently known as Qamdo PLC after census; Qamdo County is currently known as Karuo after census.)	760,966
6	Nagqu	31,436	(Note: Nagqu Prefecture is currently known as Nagqu PLC after census; Nagqu County is currently known as Seni after 2010 census.)	504,838
(7)	Mainling	5,915 (Note: Mainling County is currently known as Mainling CLC after 2020 census.)		see Nyingchi
(8)	Cona	2,871 (Note: Cona County is currently known as Cona CLC after 2020 census.)		see Shannan

=== Towns and villages ===
Beginning in 2006, 280,000 Tibetans who lived in traditional villages and as nomadic herdsmen have been forcefully relocated into villages and towns. In those areas, new housing was built and existing houses were remodelled to serve a total of 2 million people. Those living in substandard housing were required to demolish their houses and remodel them to the Chinese governments standards. Much of the expense was borne by the residents themselves, often through bank loans. The population transfer program, which was first implemented in Qinghai where 300,000 nomads were resettled, is called "Comfortable Housing", which is part of the "Build a New Socialist Countryside" program. Its effect on Tibetan culture has been criticized by exiles and human rights groups. Finding employment is difficult for relocated persons who have only agrarian skills. Income shortfalls are offset by government support programs. It was announced that in 2011 that 20,000 CCP cadres will be placed in the new towns.

== Demographics ==
Historical population
Year	Pop.	±%
1912	1,160,000	—
1928	372,000	−67.9%
1936–37	372,000	+0.0%
1947	1,000,000	+168.8%
1954	1,273,969	+27.4%
1964	1,251,225	−1.8%
1982	1,892,393	+51.2%
1990	2,196,010	+16.0%
2000	2,616,329	+19.1%
2010	3,002,166	+14.7%
2020	3,648,100	+21.5%
Xikang Province / Chuanbian SAR was established in 1923 from parts of Tibet / Lifan Yuan; dissolved in 1955 and parts were incorporated into Tibet AR.

In 2024, only 39.7 percent of Tibet's population was urban, with 60.3 being rural, amongst the lowest in China, though this is significantly up from 22.6 percent in 2011.

In 2020 the Tibetan population was three million. The ethnic Tibetans, comprising 86.0% of the population, mainly adhere to Tibetan Buddhism and Bön, although there is an ethnic Tibetan Muslim community. Other Muslim ethnic groups such as the Hui and the Salar have inhabited the region. There is also a tiny Tibetan Christian community in eastern Tibet. Smaller tribal groups such as the Monpa and Lhoba, who follow a combination of Tibetan Buddhism and spirit worship, are found mainly in the southeastern parts of the region.

Historically, the population of Tibet consisted of primarily ethnic Tibetans. According to tradition the original ancestors of the Tibetan people, as represented by the six red bands in the Tibetan flag, are: the Se, Mu, Dong, Tong, Dru and Ra. Other traditional ethnic groups with significant population or with the majority of the ethnic group reside in Tibet include Bai people, Blang, Bonan, Dongxiang, Han, Hui people, Lhoba, Lisu people, Miao, Mongols, Monguor (Tu people), Menba (Monpa), Mosuo, Nakhi, Qiang, Nu people, Pumi, Salar, and Yi people.

According to the Encyclopædia Britannica Eleventh Edition published between 1910 and 1911, the population of Lhasa was about 30,000, and the permanent population also included Chinese families (about 2,000). Most Han people in the TAR (12.2% of the total population) are recent migrants, because all of the Han were expelled from "Outer Tibet" (central Tibet) following the British invasion until the establishment of the PRC. As of 2010, only 8% of Han people have household registration in TAR, others keep their household registration in place of origin. Tibetan exiles claim that, with the 2006 completion of the Qingzang Railway connecting the Tibet Autonomous Region to Qinghai Province, there has been an "acceleration" of Han migration into the region. The Tibetan government-in-exile based in northern India asserts that the PRC is promoting the migration of Han workers and soldiers to Tibet to marginalize and assimilate the locals.

=== Religion ===
Religion in Tibet (2012 estimates)
Tibetan Buddhism	78.5%
Bon	12.5%
Chinese folk religion	8.58%
Islam	0.4%
Christianity	0.02%

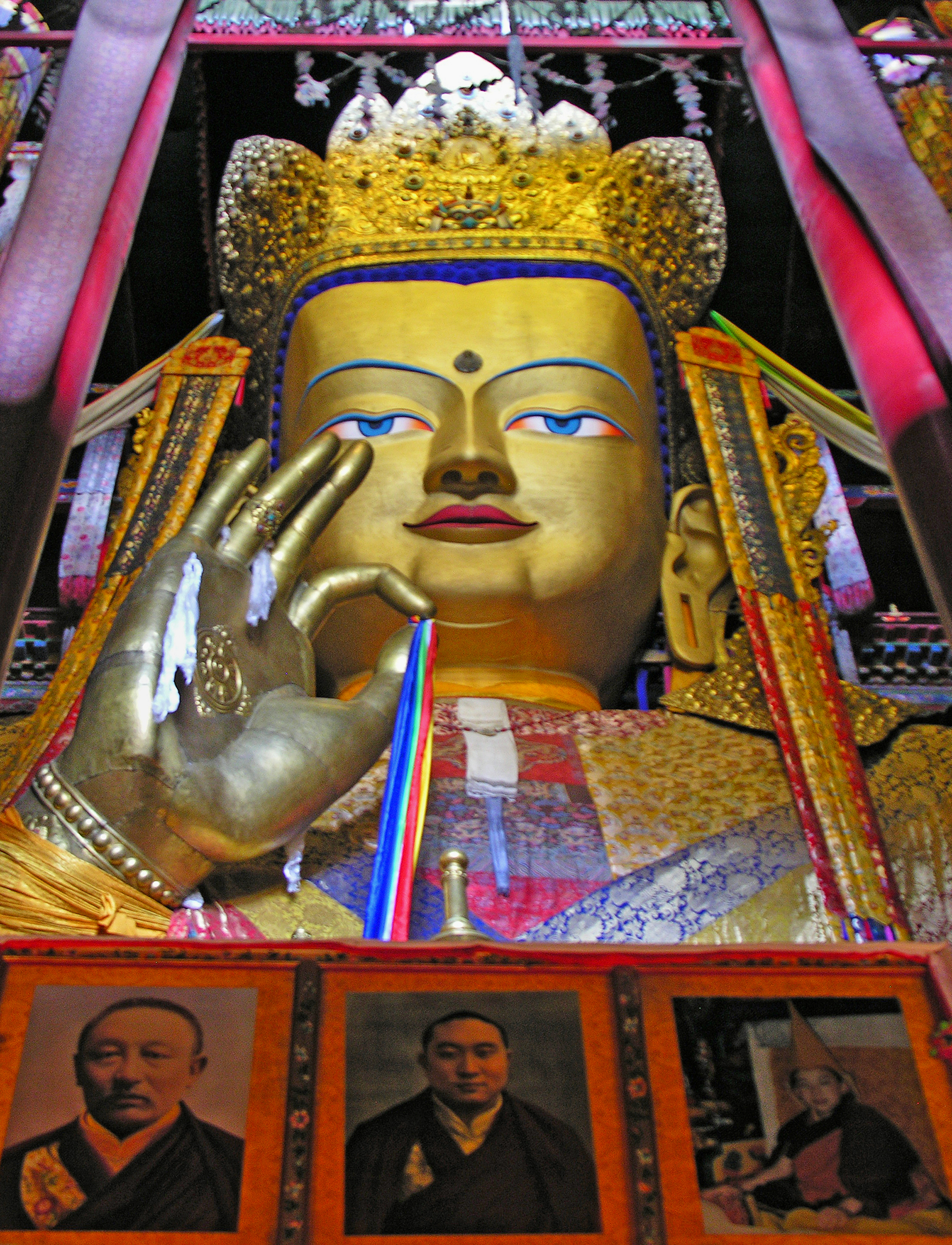
Maitreya Buddha statue of Tashilhunpo Monastery in Shigatse

The main religion in Tibet has been Buddhism since its introduction in the 8th century AD. Before the arrival of Buddhism, the main religion among Tibetans was an indigenous shamanic and animistic religion, Bon, which now comprises a sizeable minority and influenced the formation of Tibetan Buddhism. Tibetan Buddhists across the region periodically embark on a holy pilgrimage to Lhasa where continuous prostration throughout their journey is encouraged, as depicted in films like Paths of the Soul and Ala Changso.

According to estimates from the International Religious Freedom Report of 2012, most Tibetans (who comprise 91% of the population of the Tibet Autonomous Region) are adherents of Tibetan Buddhism, while a minority of 400,000 people are followers the native Bon or folk religions which share the image of Confucius (Tibetan: Kongtse Trulgyi Gyalpo) with Chinese folk religion, though in a different light. According to state media outlet Tibet.cn, the government of China has been promoting the Bon religion, linking it with Confucianism.

Most of the Han Chinese who reside in Tibet practice their native Chinese folk religion (神道; shén dào; 'Way of the Gods'). There is a Guandi Temple of Lhasa (拉萨关帝庙) where the Chinese god of war Guandi is identified with the cross-ethnic Chinese, Tibetan, Mongol and Manchu deity Gesar. The temple is built according to both Chinese and Tibetan architecture. It was first erected in 1792 under the Qing dynasty and renovated in 2015 after decades of disrepair.

There are four mosques in the Tibet Autonomous Region with approximately 4,000 to 5,000 Muslim adherents, although a 2010 Chinese survey found a higher proportion of 0.4%. There is a Catholic church with 700 parishioners, which is located in the traditionally Catholic community of Yanjing in the east of the region.

== Human rights ==
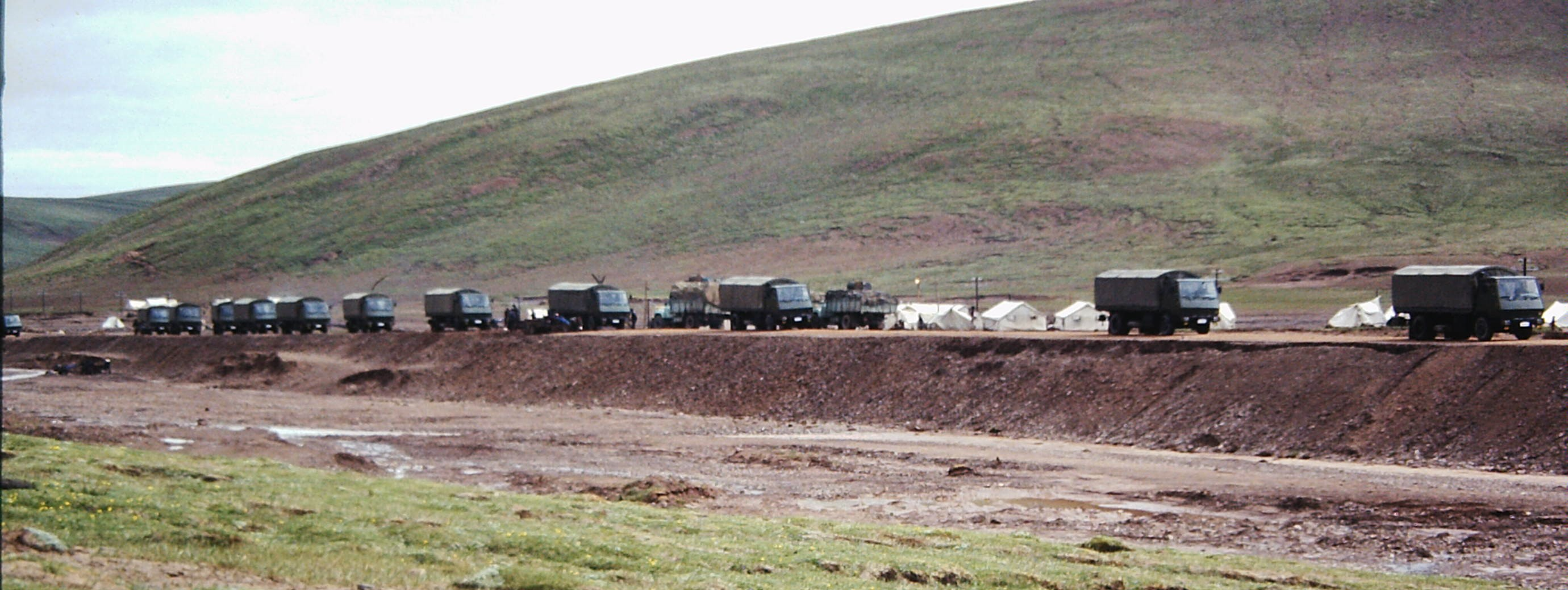
Chinese army division moving from Golmud to Lhasa

From the 1951 Seventeen Point Agreement to 2003, life expectancy in Tibet increased from 36 years to 67 years with infant mortality and absolute poverty declining steadily. Before the annexation of Tibet by the People's Republic of China in 1951, Tibet was ruled by a theocracy and had a caste-like social hierarchy. Human rights in Tibet prior to its incorporation into the People's Republic of China differed considerably from those in the modern era. Due to tight control of press in mainland China, including the Tibet Autonomous Region, it is difficult to accurately determine the scope of human rights abuses.

When General Secretary Hu Yaobang visited Tibet in 1980 and 1982, he disagreed with what he viewed as heavy-handedness. Hu reduced the number of Han party cadre, and relaxed social controls. Critics of the Chinese Communist Party (CCP) claim the CCP's official aim to eliminate "the three evils of separatism, terrorism and religious extremism" is used as a pretext for human rights abuses. A 1992 Amnesty International report stated that judicial standards in the Tibet Autonomous Region were not up to "international standards". The report accused the CCP government with keeping political prisoners and prisoners of conscience; ill-treatment of detainees, including torture, and inaction in the face of ill-treatment; the use of the death penalty; extrajudicial executions; and forced abortion and sterilization.

The mainly state-funded American advocacy group Freedom House ranked the Tibet Autonomous Region as "not free" in their 2025 annual world report, giving the region a rating of −2 out of 40 for political rights and 2 out of 60 for civil liberties. This gives the region a total score of 0 out of 100, positioning it as one of the least free places on earth.

On 23 May 2026, the India-based Central Tibetan Administration (CTA) renewed its demand of genuine autonomy for Tibet as China marked the anniversary of the 1951 Seventeen Point Agreement, which Beijing describes as the "peaceful liberation" of Tibet. The CTA accused China of tightening control over Tibet and restricting freedoms of Tibetans since taking control in the 1950s, including after the 1959 uprising in Lhasa.

== Economy ==
Development of GDP
Year	GDP in billions of yuan
1995	5.61
2000	11.78
2005	24.88
2010	50.75
2015	102.64
2021	208.18
2022	213
2023	239.3

In general, autonomous regions of China have some of the highest per capita government spending on public goods and services. Providing public goods and services in these areas is part of a government effort to reduce regional inequalities, reduce the risk of separatism, and stimulate economic development. Tibet has the highest amount of funding from the central government to the local government as of at least 2019. As of at least 2019, Tibet has the largest total per capita government expenditure of any region in China, including on health care, the highest per capita government expenditure on education, and the second highest per capita government expenditure on social security and employment.

The Tibetans traditionally depended upon agriculture for survival. Since the 1980s, however, other jobs such as taxi-driving and hotel retail work have become available in the wake of the reform and opening up. By 2023, its gross domestic product (GDP) stood at nearly 239.3 billion yuan (about 33.6 billion U.S. dollars), adding that the growth rates of the region's major economic indicators, including per capita disposable income, fixed asset investment, and total retail sales of consumer goods, all ranked first in China. The added value of the service sector accounted for 54.1 percent and contributed a 57.6 percent share to economic growth. Investment in fixed assets also grew rapidly last year, with investment in infrastructure up by 34.8 percent and investment in areas related to people's livelihoods up by 31.8 percent. The region's GDP grew by an annual average of 9.5 percent from 2012 to 2023, about 3 percentage points higher than the China's national average.

By 2022, the GDP of the region surpassed 213 billion yuan (US$31.7 billion in nominal), while GDP per capita reached CN¥58,438 (US$8,688 in nominal). In 2022, Tibet's GDP per capita ranked 25th highest in China, as well as higher than any South Asian country except Maldives. In 2008, Chinese news media reported that the per capita disposable incomes of urban and rural residents in Tibet averaged (CN¥12,482 (US$1,798) and CN¥3,176 (US$457) respectively. While traditional agriculture and animal husbandry continue to lead the area's economy, in 2005 the tertiary sector contributed more than half of its GDP growth, the first time it surpassed the area's primary industry.

The collection of caterpillar fungus (Cordyceps sinensis, known in Tibetan as Yartsa Gunbu) in late spring / early summer is in many areas the most important source of cash for rural households. It contributes an average of 40% to rural cash income and 8.5% to the Tibet Autonomous Region's GDP.

The re-opening of the Nathu La pass (on southern Tibet's border with India) should facilitate Sino-Indian border trade and boost Tibet's economy. The China Western Development policy was adopted in 2000 by the central government to boost economic development in western China, including the Tibet Autonomous Region. Because the central government permits Tibet to have a preferentially low corporate income tax rate, many corporations have registered in Tibet.

== Education ==
According to the Ministry of Education, there are 4 universities and 3 colleges, including Tibet University, Tibet University for Nationalities, Tibet University of Traditional Tibetan Medicine , Tibet Agricultural and Animal Husbandry College, Lhasa Teachers College, Tibet Police Officers Institute and Tibet Vocational and Technical College. As of at least 2019, Tibet is the region of China with the most notable per capita government spending on education.

== Tourism ==
Foreign tourists were first permitted to visit in the 1980s. The number of tourists increased rapidly in the 2020s. In 2025, around 70 million tourists visited Tibet. While the main attraction is the Potala Palace in Lhasa, there are many other popular tourist destinations including the Jokhang Temple, Namtso Lake, and Tashilhunpo Monastery. Nonetheless, tourism is still restricted for non-Chinese passport holders (including citizens of the Republic of China from Taiwan), and foreigners must apply for a Tibet Travel Permit to enter the region, as well as Alien's Travel Permit if travelling elsewhere in TAR outside Lhasa.

== Transportation ==
A 2019 white paper from the State Council Information Office of the People's Republic of China reported Tibet's road system has achieved a total of 118,800 km.

=== Airports ===
The civil airports are Lhasa Gonggar Airport, Qamdo Bangda Airport, Nyingchi Airport, and the Gunsa Airport. Gunsa Airport in Ngari Prefecture began operations in 2010 to become the fourth civil airport in TAR. The Peace Airport for Shigatse was opened for civilian use in 2010. Nagqu Dagring Airport was expected to become the world's highest altitude airport, at 4,436 meters above sea level. However, in 2015, China Daily reported that construction of the airport has been delayed due to the necessity to develop higher technological standards.

=== Railway ===
The Qinghai–Tibet Railway from Golmud to Lhasa was completed in 2005. Five pairs of passenger trains run between Golmud and Lhasa, with connections onward to Beijing, Chengdu, Chongqing, Guangzhou, Shanghai, Xining and Lanzhou. The line includes the Tanggula Pass, which at 5,072 m (16,640 ft) above sea level is the world's highest railway.

The Lhasa–Shigatse Railway branch from Lhasa to Shigatse was completed in 2014. The planned China–Nepal railway will connect Shigatse to Kathmandu and is expected to be completed around 2027. The construction of the Sichuan–Tibet Railway began in 2015. The line is expected to be completed around 2030.

== See also ==
- China Tibetology Research Center
- History of Tibet (1950–present)
- Kazara
- List of prisons in the Tibet Autonomous Region
- Tibetan independence movement
- Sinicization of Tibet
- Shigatse Photovoltaic Power Plant
