= List of modern political leaders of Tibet =

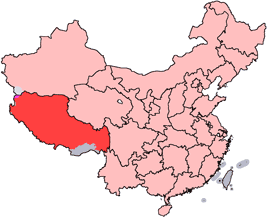
Tibet Autonomous Region within the People's Republic of China

This article lists the modern political leaders of Tibet within the People's Republic of China. The transition from Lamaist rule in Tibet started in 1951 with the Seventeen Point Agreement between the Central People's Government and the 14th Dalai Lama. A "Preparatory Committee for the Autonomous Region of Tibet" (PCART) was established in 1956 in the former Tibet Area to create a parallel system of administration along Communist lines. Transition to secular government completed when Tibet Autonomous Region was officially founded in 1965 according to the national autonomy law.

The politics in Tibet are structured in a dual party-government system like all other governing institutions in the People's Republic of China. Both the Chairman of the Tibet Autonomous Region and the chairman of the regional People's Congress, are by law ethnic Tibetans. There is also a branch secretary of the Chinese Communist Party (CCP), who is the top executive official.

== TAR Government Chairmen ==
The chairman is the nominal leader of the Tibet Autonomous Region (TAR), a province-level administrative division of the People's Republic of China. The chairmen, and their times in office, are listed below. In practice, the chairman is subordinate to the branch secretary of the Chinese Communist Party.

Directors of the Preparatory Committee for the Tibet Autonomous Region

1. 14th Dalai Lama: April 1956 – March 1959
2. 10th Panchen Lama: March 1959 – December 1964 (acting)
3. Ngapoi Ngawang Jigme: December 1964 – September 1965 (acting)

Chairmen of the Tibet Autonomous Region People's Committee

1. Ngapoi Ngawang Jigme: September 1965 – September 1968

Heads of the Tibet Autonomous Region Revolutionary Committee
As was the situation elsewhere in mainland China during the Cultural Revolution, the regional government was replaced by a revolutionary committee.

1. Zeng Yongya (曾雍雅): September 1968 – November 1970
2. Ren Rong (任荣): November 1970 – August 1979

Chairmen of the Tibet Autonomous Region People's Government

1. Sanggyai Yexe (Tian Bao): August 1979 – April 1981
2. Ngapoi Ngawang Jigme: April 1981 – May 1983
3. Dorje Tseten (རྡོ་རྗེ་ཚེ་བརྟན་ / 多杰才旦) a.k.a. Dorje Tsetsen or Duoji Caidan: May 1983 – December 1985
4. Doje Cering (རྡོ་རྗེ་ཚེ་རིང་ / 多吉才让 ) a.k.a. Dorje Tsering or Duoji Cairang: December 1985 – May 1990
5. Gyaincain Norbu: May 1990 – May 1998
6. Legqog: May 1998 – May 2003
7. Qiangba Puncog: May 2003 – January 2010
8. Padma Choling: January 2010 – January 2013
9. Losang Jamcan: January 2013 – January 2017
10. Che Dalha (齐扎拉): January 2017 – October 2021
11. Yan Jinhai: October 2021 – October 2024
12. Garma Cedain: from November 2024

== CCP TAR Committee Secretaries ==
No.	Image	Name	Term start	Term end	Ref.
1		Zhang Guohua (张国华) (1914–1972)	24 January 1950	June 1951	
2		Fan Ming (范明) (1914–2010)	June 1951	December 1951	
3		Zhang Jingwu (张经武) (1906–1971)	March 1952	September 1965	
4		Zhang Guohua (张国华) (1914–1972)	September 1965	February 1967	
5		Ren Rong (任荣) (1917–2017)	August 1971	March 1980	
6		Yin Fatang (阴法唐) (1922–2025)	March 1980	June 1985	
7		Wu Jinghua (伍精华) (1931–2007)	June 1985	1 December 1988	
8		Hu Jintao (胡锦涛) (born 1942)	1 December 1988	1 December 1992	
9		Chen Kuiyuan (陈奎元) (born 1941)	1 December 1992	16 October 2000	
10		Guo Jinlong (郭金龙) (born 1947)	16 October 2000	16 December 2004	
11		Yang Chuantang (杨传堂) (born 1954)	16 December 2004	29 May 2006	
12		Zhang Qingli (张庆黎) (born 1951)	29 May 2006	25 August 2011	
13		Chen Quanguo (陈全国) (born 1955)	25 August 2011	28 August 2016	
14		Wu Yingjie (吴英杰) (born 1956)	28 August 2016	18 October 2021	
15		Wang Junzheng (王君正) (born 1963)	18 October 2021	Incumbent	

== TAR People's Congress Standing Committee Chairmen ==
Chairmen of the Standing Committee of the Tibet Autonomous Region People's Congress

1. Ngapoi Ngawang Jigme (ང་ཕོད་ངག་དབང་འཇིགས་མེད་ / 阿沛·阿旺晋美): 1979–1981
2. Yang Dongsheng (杨东生) (né ཤེས་རབ་དོན་གྲུབ། / 协饶登珠) (ethnic Tibetan): 1981–1983
3. Ngapoi Ngawang Jigme (ང་ཕོད་ངག་དབང་འཇིགས་མེད་ / 阿沛·阿旺晋美): 1983–1993
4. Raidi (རག་སྡི་ / 热地): 1993–2003
5. Legqog (ལེགས་མཆོག / 列确): 2003–2010
6. Qiangba Puncog (བྱམས་པ་ཕུན་ཚོགས / 向巴平措): 2010–2013
7. Padma Choling (པདྨ་འཕྲིན་ལས་ / 白玛赤林): 2013–2017
8. Losang Jamcan (བློ་བཟང་རྒྱལ་མཚན / 洛桑江村) a.k.a. Losang Gyaltsen: from 2017

== CPPCC TAR Committee Chairmen ==
Chairmen of the Chinese People's Political Consultative Conference Tibet Autonomous Region Committee

1. Tan Guansan (谭冠三)
2. Zhang Guohua (张国华)
3. Ren Rong (任荣)
4. Yin Fatang (阴法唐)
5. Yangling Dorje (杨岭多吉) (ethnic Tibetan)
6. Raidi (རག་སྡི་ / 热地)
7. Pagbalha Geleg Namgyai (འཕགས་པ་ལྷ་དགེ་ལེགས་རྣམ་རྒྱལ་ / 帕巴拉·格列朗杰), 11th Pagbalha (འཕགས་པ་ལྷ་ / 帕巴拉活佛)

== See also ==
- List of rulers of Tibet
- Central Tibetan Administration
- List of current Chinese provincial leaders
- Politics of China
- Constitution of China
