= Tibet Autonomous Region People's Congress =

Regional legislature in China

Tibet Autonomous Region People's Congress 西藏自治区人民代表大会 བོད་རང་སྐྱོང་ལྗོངས་མི་དམངས་འཐུས་མི་ཚོགས་ཆེན
- 12th Tibet Autonomous Region People's Congress

Type
- Type: Unicameral; Province-level people's congress
- Established: 1 September 1965 (60 years ago)

Leadership
- Director of the Standing Committee: Losang Jamcan
- Vice Director of the Standing Committee: Tangod; Gyaltsen; Samding Dorje Phagmo; Wang Jun; Zhang Yanqing; Xu Chengcang; Jampel; Tang Mingying; Liu Baicheng; Li Wenge; Sun Xianzhong; Liu Guangxu
- Secretary-General of the Standing Committee: Liu Guangxu

Structure
- Committees: Standing Committee of the Tibet Autonomous Region People's Congress
- Length of term: 5 years

Website
- www.xizangrd.gov.cn

Constitution
- Constitution of the People's Republic of China

Tibet Autonomous Region People's Congress

Chinese name
- Simplified Chinese: 西藏自治区人民代表大会
- Traditional Chinese: 西藏自治區人民代表大會
Transcriptions
Standard Mandarin
- Hanyu Pinyin: Xīzàng Zìzhìqū Rénmín Dàibiǎo Dàhuì

Tibetan name
- Tibetan: བོད་རང་སྐྱོང་ལྗོངས་མི་དམངས་འཐུས་མི་ཚོགས་ཆེན
Transcriptions
- Wylie: bod rang skyong ljongs mi dmangs 'thus mi tshogs chen

The People's Congress of the Tibet Autonomous Region is the local people's congress of the Tibet Autonomous Region. Following decisions taken by the National People's Congress of the People's Republic of China, the founding of the Tibet Autonomous Region and the regional government was officially announced during the first session of the Tibetan People's Congress in September 1965 in Lhasa.

== History ==
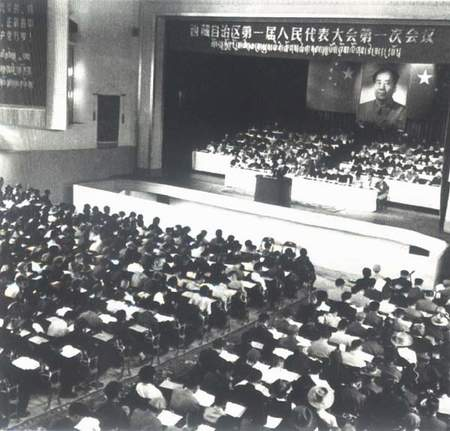
The first session of the 1st Tibet Autonomous Region People's Congress in 1965

On September 8, 1965, the first session of the 1st Tibet Autonomous Region People's Congress completed the election of the organs of self-government of the Tibet Autonomous Region and its leaders, and the formal establishment of the Tibet Autonomous Region. Ngapoi Ngawang Jigme is elected to be the chairman of the Tibet Autonomous Region.

== Organization ==
The organizational system of the People's Congress of the Tibet Autonomous Region consists of the Presidium (Chinese: 主席团), the Specialized Committees (Chinese: 专门委员会) and the Standing Committee (Chinese: 常务委员会). The Executive Chairman of the Presidium presides over the meetings of the TAR People's Congress and the meetings of the Presidium.

=== Presidium ===
At each meeting of the TAR People's Congress, a number of chairmen are elected to form the Bureau, which presides over the work of the meeting. The members of the Presidium elect from among themselves a number of persons as Standing Chairpersons, who preside over the day-to-day business of the session. The TAR People's Congress shall have a Secretary-General and a number of Deputy Secretaries-General. The Secretary-General shall be nominated by the Bureau and adopted by the Assembly. The deputy secretaries-general are decided by the Bureau. The Secretary-General directs the work of the Secretariat and is responsible for the affairs of the Assembly.

=== Specialized Committees ===
Specialized committees are subject to the leadership of the people's congresses of the Tibet Autonomous Region; when the congresses are not in session, they are subject to the leadership of the Standing Committee of the People's Congress of the Tibet Autonomous Region. Under the leadership of the TAR People's Congress and the Standing Committee of the Provincial People's Congress, the specialized committee study, deliberate and formulate relevant bills; they conduct investigations and research and make recommendations on issues within the competence of the TAR People's Congress and the Standing Committee of the TAR People's Congress which are of relevance to the committees.

=== Standing Committee ===
The Standing Committee of the Tibet Autonomous Region People's Congress is a standing organ of the TAR People's Congress, is responsible to the TAR People's Congress and reports on its work and meets at least once every two months.

=== Leaderships of the Standing Committee ===
1st–2nd Congress
no standing committee

3rd Congress

- Term: August 1979–April 1983
- Director: Ngapoi Ngawang Jigme→Yang Dongsheng (April 1981–November 1982)
- Vice-Director: Raidi, Chen Jingbo, Miao Piyi, Wang Jingzhi, Hu Zonglin, Derge Kelsang Wangdu, Tsering Lhamo, Tsogo Dondrup Tsering, Langdun Kunga Wangchuk, Sengchen Lozang Gyaltsen, Dorje Tseten (elected April 1981)
- Secretary-General: Dorje Tseten (removed November 1980), Gaisang Namgyai (elected November 1980)

4th Congress

- Term: April 1983–July 1988
- Director: Ngapoi Ngawang Jigme
- Vice-Director: Pagbalha Geleg Namgyai, Derge Kelsang Wangdu, Li Benshan (resigned May 1986), Sengchen Lozang Gyaltsen, Sholkhang Thubten Nyima, Cao Xu, Buduoji, Gaisang Namgyai, Changdrong Tashi Dorje, Peng Zhe, Serkye Khensur Lhundrup Takha (elected July 1984), Samding Dorje Phagmo (elected July 1984), Wang Guangxi (elected July 1987)
- Secretary-General: Gaisang Namgyai (resigned December 1986), Wangdu Drakpa (elected July 1987)

5th Congress

- Term: July 1988–January 1993
- Director: Ngapoi Ngawang Jigme
- Vice-Director: Pagbalha Geleg Namgyai, Sengchen Lozang Gyaltsen, Sholkhang Thubten Nyima, Buduoji, Gaisang Namgyai, Changdrong Tashi Dorje, Serkye Khensur Lhundrup Takha (elected July 1984), Samding Dorje Phagmo, Wang Guangxi, Hu Songjie
- Secretary-General: Wang Guangxi

6th Congress

- Term: January 1993–May 1998
- Director: Raidi
- Vice-Director: Phurjung, Zheng Ying, Sengchen Lozang Gyaltsen, Buduoji, Gaisang Namgyai, Samding Dorje Phagmo, Gong Daxi, Horkhang Sonam Palbar, Tian Fujun, Li Weilun, Pema Dorje, Yungdrung Gawa, Cui Jiguo, Chogyal (elected May 1996), Sonam Dargye (elected May 1996), Ma Guanghua (elected May 1996), Chapel Tseten Puntsok (elected May 1996)
- Secretary-General: Ma Guanghua

7th Congress

- Term: May 1998–January 2003
- Director: Raidi
- Vice-Director: Phurjung, Gyatso, Buduoji, Zicheng, Gong Daxi, Lu Huimin, Samding Dorje Phagmo, Tsering Samdrup, Losang Tenzin, Yungdrung Gawa, Chogyal (born 1946; re-elected), Sonam Dargye, Ma Guanghua, Chogyal (born 1941), Aku (elected May 2000), Yeshe Tenzin (elected May 2000), Sun Qiwen (elected May 2001)
- Secretary-General: Ma Guanghua (resigned May 2001)→Xu Xueguang (elected May 2001)

8th Congress

- Term: January 2003–January 2008
- Director: Raidi (resigned May 2003)→Legqog (elected May 2003)
- Vice-Director: Li Guangwen (resigned January 2007), Losang Dondrup, Samding Dorje Phagmo, Tsering Samdrup (resigned January 2006), Yungdrung Gawa, Bai Zhao, Sun Qiwen (resigned January 2007), Chogyal (born 1941; resigned January 2007), Dorje, Chophel, Jampa Ganden, Aku, Jin Xisheng, Ma Zebi, Tseten Phuntsok, Zhao Lian (elected January 2006), Wu Jilie (January 2006–January 2007), Thubten Tsewang (elected January 2007), Nyima Dradul (elected January 2007)
- Secretary-General: Xu Xueguang (resigned January 2007), Song Shanli (elected January 2007)

9th Congress

- Term: January 2008–January 2013
- Director: Legqog (resigned January 2010)→Qiangba Puncog (elected January 2010)
- Vice-Director: Thubten Tsewang (resigned January 2011), Nyima Tsering, Zhang Yueping, Samding Dorje Phagmo, Karma, Zhou Chunlai, Song Shanli, Kelsang Tsering (resigned January 2011), Zhao Zhengxiu, Dong Mingjun (resigned January 2011), Adeng, Shingtsa Tenzin Chodrak, Ma Rulong, Tsering (elected January 2011), Dorje (elected January 2011), Wu Jinhui (elected January 2011)
- Secretary-General: Zhao Zhengxiu

10th Congress

- Term: January 2013–January 2018
- Director: Padma Choling→Losang Jamcan (elected January 2017)
- Vice-Director: Karma, Zhou Chunlai, Zhao Zhengxiu, Samding Dorje Phagmo, Shingtsa Tenzin Chodrak, Ma Rulong (resigned January 2016), Dorje (resigned January 2016), Wu Jinhui (resigned January 2016), Wang Ruilian, Zhao He (resigned January 2016), Tenzin Namgyal, Odser, Le Dake (removed October 2015), Xu Xueguang (elected January 2015), Ju Jianhua (elected January 2016), Li Wenhan (elected January 2016), Nyima Tsering (elected January 2016), Zhang Xiaohua (elected January 2016), Ji Guogang (elected January 2016), Duotuo (elected January 2017)
- Secretary-General: Duan Xiangzheng (resigned January 2015), Liu Guangxu (elected January 2015)

11th Congress

- Term: January 2018–January 2023
- Director: Losang Jamcan
- Vice-Director: Duotuo, Tenzin Namgyal, Samding Dorje Phagmo, Odser, Xu Xueguang (resigned January 2022), Chimed Rigzin (resigned January 2022), Ju Jianhua (resigned January 2021), Li Wenhan (resigned January 2021), Nyima Tsering, Ji Guogang, Ma Shengchang, Wang Jun, Xu Chengcang, Ding Yexian (resigned January 2021), Norbu Dondrup (elected January 2021), Tang Mingying (elected January 2021), Tangod (elected January 2022)
- Secretary-General: Liu Guangxu

12th Congress

- Term: January 2023–present
- Director: Losang Jamcan→Yan Jinhai (2015-)
- Vice-Director: Tangod, Gyaltsen, Samding Dorje Phagmo, Wang Jun, Zhang Yanqing, Xu Chengcang, Jampel, Tang Mingying, Liu Baicheng, Li Wenge, Sun Xianzhong, Liu Guangxu
- Secretary-General: Liu Guangxu

== See also ==
- Standing Committee of the Tibet Autonomous Region People's Congress
- CCP Committee Secretary
- Chinese People's Political Consultative Conference
