= Chairman of Tibet =

Chairman of the Tibet Autonomous Region People's Government
- 西藏自治区人民政府主席
- National Emblem of China

- Flag of China

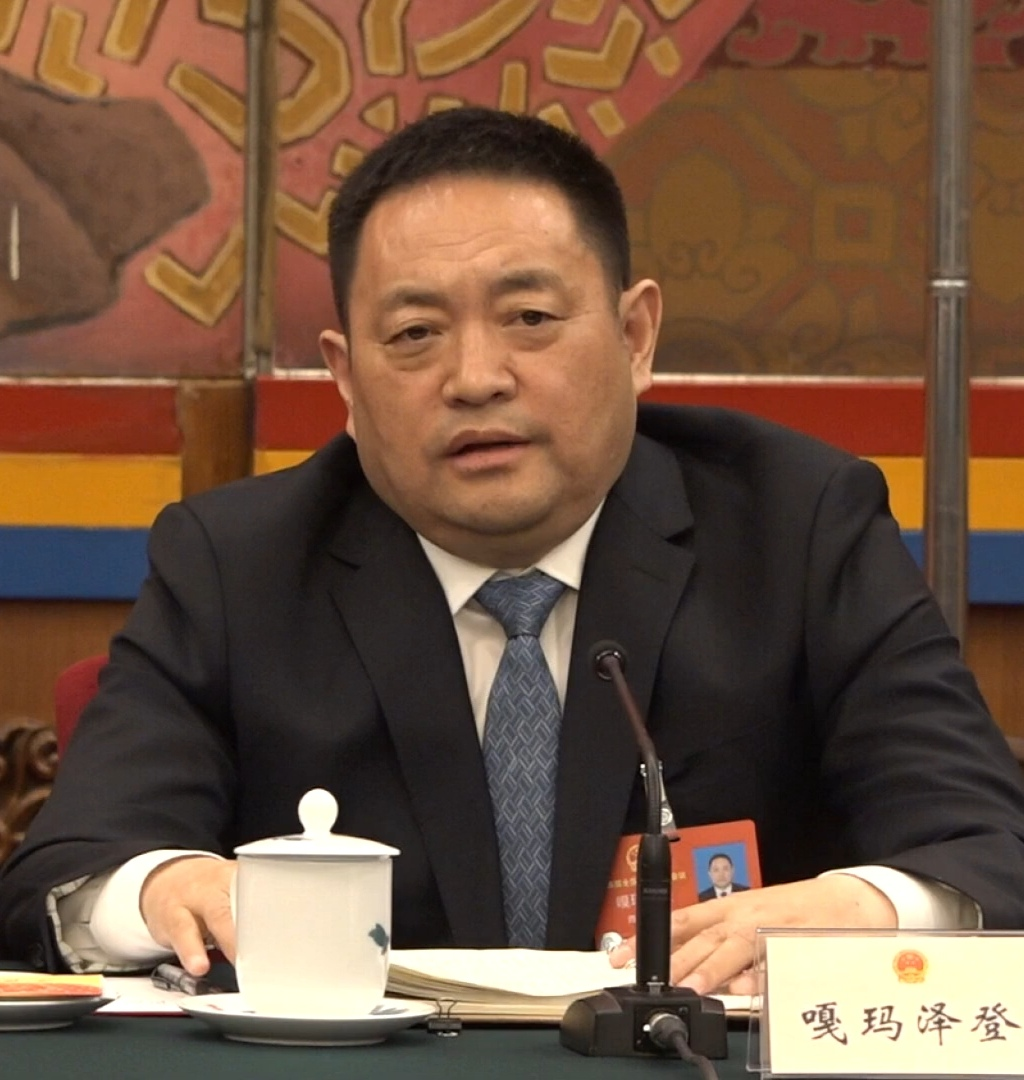
- Incumbent; Garma Cedain since 28 November 2024
- People's Government of the Tibet Autonomous Region
- Type: Head of government
- Status: Provincial and ministerial-level official
- Reports to: Tibet Autonomous Region People's Congress and its Standing Committee
- Nominator: Presidium of the Tibet Autonomous Region People's Congress
- Appointer: Tibet Autonomous Region People's Congress
- Term length: Five years, renewable
- Inaugural holder: Ngapoi Ngawang Jigme
- Formation: September 1965
- Deputy: Deputy Chairperson; Secretary-General

The Chairman of the Tibet Autonomous Region People's Government is the head of the Tibet Autonomous Region and leader of the People's Government of the Tibet Autonomous Region.

The chairperson is elected by the Tibet Autonomous Region People's Congress, and responsible to it and its Standing Committee. The chairperson is a provincial level official and is responsible for the overall decision-making of the regional government. The chairperson is assisted by an executive vice chairperson as well as several vice chairpersons. The chairperson generally serves as the deputy secretary of the Tibet Autonomous Regional Committee of the Chinese Communist Party and as a member of the CCP Central Committee. The chairperson is the second-highest ranking official in the autonomous region after the secretary of the CCP Tibet Committee. The government chairman is always a Tibetan. The current chairperson is Garma Cedain, who took office on 28 November 2024.

== List ==
=== People's Republic of China ===
No.	Officeholder	Term of office		Party	Ref.
No.	Officeholder	Took office	Left office	Party	Ref.
Chairman of the People's Committee of the Tibet Autonomous Region
1	Ngapoi Ngawang Jigme (1910–2009)	September 1965	August 1968	Chinese Communist Party	
Chairman of the Revolutionary Committee of the Tibet Autonomous Region
2	Zeng Yongya (1917–1995)	September 1968	November 1970	Chinese Communist Party	
3	Ren Rong (1917–2017)	November 1970	August 1979	Chinese Communist Party	
4	Sanggyai Yexe (1917–2008)	August 1979	April 1981	Chinese Communist Party	
Chairman of the People's Government of the Tibet Autonomous Region
5	Ngapoi Ngawang Jigme (1910–2009)	April 1981	February 1983	Chinese Communist Party	
6	Dorje Tseten (1926–2013)	1983	1985	Chinese Communist Party	
7	Doje Cering (born 1939)	1985	1990	Chinese Communist Party	
8	Gyaincain Norbu (born 1932)	1990	1998	Chinese Communist Party	
9	Legqog (born 1944)	May 1998	April 2003	Chinese Communist Party	
10	Qiangba Puncog (born 1947)	16 March 2003	15 January 2010	Chinese Communist Party	
11	Padma Choling (born 1952)	15 January 2010	29 January 2013	Chinese Communist Party	
12	Losang Jamcan (born 1957)	29 January 2013	15 January 2017	Chinese Communist Party	
13	Che Dalha (born 1958)	15 January 2017	8 October 2021	Chinese Communist Party	
14	Yan Jinhai (born 1962)	8 October 2021	28 November 2024	Chinese Communist Party	
15	Garma Cedain (born 1967)	22 January 2025 (acting from 28 November 2024)	Incumbent	Chinese Communist Party	
