= Tibet Development Fund =

The Tibet Development Fund (Chinese: 援助西藏发展基金会), the only national public foundation in the Tibet Autonomous Region of China, was initiated by the Choekyi Gyaltsen, 10th Panchen Lama and Ngapoi Ngawang Jigme, Vice Chairperson of the Standing Committee of the National People's Congress. A preparatory committee was formed in April 1987 in Beijing, with both vice-chairmen leading the effort.

== History ==
The foundation was officially established in April 1992 in Beijing. Ngapoi Ngawang Jigme, Vice Chairperson of the Chinese People's Political Consultative Conference (CPPCC), became the chairman of the Board of Directors, while Pagbalha Geleg Namgyai, also a vice-chairman of the CPPCC, and Sanggyai Yexe, former Chairman of the Tibet Autonomous Region, were appointed as vice-chairmen of the Foundation. The Foundation raises funds from across China, including from patriotic Tibetans abroad, Hong Kong, Macao, and Taiwan compatriots, overseas Chinese communities, and international organizations and individuals.
