= Jigme Namgyal =

Vice-mayor of Lhasa

Jigme Namgyal (also known as Jiming Nanjia) is the current vice-mayor of Lhasa. He is more concerned with the cultural preservation of Lhasa, than the growth-oriented mayor Doje Cezhug. However, he shares Cezhug's anti-Dalai Lama sympathies.

== 2008 riots ==
On the second anniversary of the riots, Namgyal delivered a response to a speech by the Dalai Lama, accused by the Chinese government to have fomented the 2008 Lhasa violence. He said that the Lama was "a separatist who uses religion as a cloak", and reports that contrary to the Lama's allegations, the Buddhist monks in Lhasa are doing well, focused on improving their qualities of life.

== Culture ==
He has helped to earmark 205 million yuan for the renovation of the Potala Palace and other major monasteries. All the government documents he issues are bilingual, in Han and Tibetan. Mr. Namgyal takes a relatively liberal stand on religious freedom: "In Tibet, people can believe whatever they want as long as it is legal. The government won't interfere. Instead it will help people solve problems along the way," he was quoted as saying.
