= Supervisory Committee of the Tibet Autonomous Region =

The Supervisory Committee of the Tibet Autonomous Region (Chinese: 西藏自治区监察委员会 Tibetan: བོད་རང་སྐྱོང་ལྗོངས་ལྟ་ཞིབ་ཨུ་ཡོན་ལྷན་ཁང་།), TAR Supervisory Committee (Chinese: 西藏自治区监委), or Tibet Supervisory Committee for short, is a provincial-level local State Supervisory Organs of the People's Republic of China Tibet Autonomous Region, which is co-located with the Tibet Autonomous Region Commission for Discipline Inspection.

== History ==
On February 1, 2018, the Supervisory Committee of the Tibet Autonomous Region was formally listed and established. Wu Yingjie, Secretary of the Party Committee of the Autonomous Region and head of the Autonomous Region's Pilot Working Group for Deepening the Reform of the State Supervision System, unveiled the plaque of the Autonomous Region's Supervision Committee. On July 31, 2019, the twelfth meeting of the Standing Committee of the Eleventh National People's Congress of the Tibet Autonomous Region (TAR) adopted the decision that Wang Weidong is the acting director of the TAR Supervisory Committee. On January 11, 2020, the 14th plenary session of the Third Session of the Eleventh People's Congress of the Tibet Autonomous Region (TAR) adopted the appointment of Wang Weidong as the Director of the Supervisory Committee of the TAR.
