= Norbu Dondrup =

Chinese politician and judge

- ནོར་བུ་དོན་གྲུབ

Executive Vice Chairman of Tibet Autonomous Region
- Incumbent
- Assumed office December 2016
- Chairman: Che Dalha

Communist Party Secretary of Chamdo
- In office November 2011 – April 2017
- Preceded by: Wang Ruilian
- Succeeded by: Abu

Chairman of Higher People's Court of Tibet Autonomous Region
- In office January 2007 – January 2013
- Preceded by: Nima Zhandui
- Succeeded by: Suoda

Mayor of Lhasa
- In office December 2002 – September 2006
- Preceded by: Losang Jamcan
- Succeeded by: Doje Cezhug

Personal details
- Born: December 1960 (age 65) Qonggyai County, Tibet Autonomous Region, China
- Party: Chinese Communist Party
- Education: People's Public Security University of China; Central Party School of the Chinese Communist Party

Chinese name
- Traditional Chinese: 羅布頓珠
- Simplified Chinese: 罗布顿珠
Transcriptions
Standard Mandarin
- Hanyu Pinyin: Luó Bù Dùn Zhū

Tibetan name
- Tibetan: ནོར་བུ་དོན་གྲུབ

Norbu Dondrup (Tibetan: ནོར་བུ་དོན་གྲུབ; Chinese: 罗布顿珠; born December 1960) is an ethnic Tibetan politician of China. He is the Executive Vice Chairman of Tibet Autonomous Region and a member of the Standing Committee of the Tibet Autonomous Region Committee of the Chinese Communist Party (CCP).

== Biography ==
Norbu Dondrup was born in Qonggyai County, Tibet Autonomous Region, China in December 1960. Both his parents and grandparents were serfs and slaves. In September 1975, at age 14, he entered the Central Political and Legal Cadre School (now People's Public Security University of China), where he graduated in August 1978.

After university, he joined the Shannan Public Security Bureau, where he was promoted to become its chief in September 1995. In July 1998, he was transferred to Lhasa and appointed police chief and a member of the Standing Committee of the CCP Lhasa Committee. He was Deputy Communist Party Secretary of Lhasa in July 2001, and held that office until September 2006. In December 2002, at the age of 41, he became Mayor of Lhasa, and served until September 2006. He served as Executive Vice Chairman of Higher People's Court of Tibet Autonomous Region in September 2006, and four months later promoted to the chairman position. In November 2011 he was transferred to Chamdo and appointed CCP committee secretary, a position he held until April 2017. In December 2016 he was promoted to Executive Vice Chairman of Tibet Autonomous Region.

He was a delegate to the 10th National People's Congress and a delegate to the 18th National Congress of the Chinese Communist Party. He is an alternate member of the 19th Central Committee of the Chinese Communist Party.

Government offices
Preceded by Losang Jamcan	Mayor of Lhasa; 2002–2006	Succeeded by Doje Cezhug
Legal offices
Preceded by Nima Zhandui	Chairman of Higher People's Court of Tibet Autonomous Region; 2007–2013	Succeeded by Suoda
Party political offices
Preceded by Wang Ruilian	Communist Party Secretary of Chamdo; 2011–2017	Succeeded by Abu
