= Ngapoi Ngawang Jigme =

Tibetan politician (1910–2009)

- ང་ཕོད་ངག་དབང་འཇིགས་མེད་ 阿沛·阿旺晋美
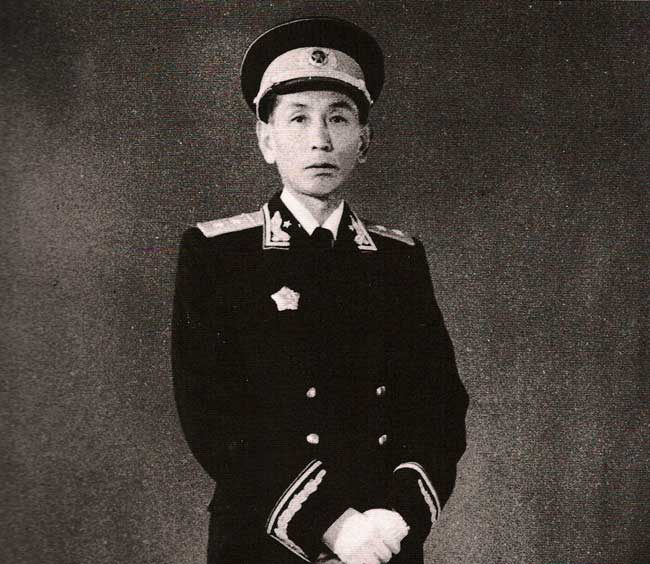

Vice Chairman of the Chinese People's Political Consultative Conference
- In office 27 March 1993 – 23 December 2009
- Chairman: Li Ruihuan→Jia Qinglin
- In office 29 April 1959 – 5 January 1965
- Chairman: Zhou Enlai

Chairman of the Standing Committee of the Tibet Autonomous Region People's Congress
- In office February 1983 – January 1993
- Preceded by: Yang Dongsheng
- Succeeded by: Raidi
- In office August 1979 – April 1981
- Preceded by: new position
- Succeeded by: Yang Dongsheng

Chairman of Tibet
- In office September 1965 – August 1968
- Preceded by: Choekyi Gyaltsen
- Succeeded by: Zeng Yongya
- In office 1981–1983
- Preceded by: Sanggyai Yexe
- Succeeded by: Doje Cedain

Vice Chairman of the Standing Committee of the National People's Congress
- In office 3 January 1965 – 27 March 1993
- Chairman: Zhu De→Ye Jianying→Peng Zhen→Wan Li

Delegate to the National People's Congress
- In office September 1954 – December 1964
- Chairman: Liu Shaoqi→Zhu De

Kalön of Tibet
- In office 1950–1959 Serving with Thupten Kunkhen (until 1951), Kashopa Chogyal Nyima (1945–1949), Lhalu Tsewang Dorje (1946–1952), Dogan Penjor Rabgye (1949–1957), Khyenrab Wangchug (1951–1956), Liushar Thubten Tharpa (since 1955), Sampho Tsewang Rigzin (since 1957), and Surkhang Wangchen Gelek
- Monarch: 14th Dalai Lama

Governor of Domai
- In office August 1950 – October 1950
- Monarch: 14th Dalai Lama
- Preceded by: Lhalu Tsewang Dorje
- Succeeded by: title abolished

Personal details
- Born: February 1, 1910 Lhasa, Tibet, Qing Empire
- Died: December 23, 2009 (aged 99) Beijing, People's Republic of China
- Spouse: Ngapoi Cedain Zhoigar
- Awards: Order of Liberation (First Class Medal)

Military service
- Allegiance: Tibet; People's Republic of China
- Branch/service: Tibetan Army; People's Liberation Army Ground Force
- Rank: Lieutenant General of the PLA
- Commands: Deputy Commander, PLA Tibet Military District; Kalön (minister), Kashag; Commander-in-chief, Tibetan Army in Chamdo
- Battles/wars: Battle of Chamdo

Ngapoi Ngawang Jigme (Tibetan: ང་ཕོད་ངག་དབང་འཇིགས་མེད་, Wylie: Nga phod Ngag dbang 'jigs med, ZWPY: Ngapo Ngawang Jigmê, Lhasa dialect: [ŋɑ̀pø̂ː ŋɑ̀wɑŋ t͡ɕíʔmi]; Chinese: 阿沛·阿旺晋美; pinyin: Āpèi Āwàng Jìnměi; February 1, 1910 – December 23, 2009) was a Tibetan senior official who assumed various military and political responsibilities both before and after 1951 in Tibet. He is often known simply as Ngapoi in English sources.

== Early life ==
Ngapoi Ngawang Jigme was born in Karma Gorge of Lhasa as the son of a leading Tibetan aristocratic family descended from former kings of Tibet, the Horkhang. His father was governor of Chamdo in Eastern Tibet and commander of the Tibetan armed forces. After studying traditional Tibetan literature, he went to Britain for further education. He was married to Ngapoi Cedain Zhoigar, Vice President of the Tibetan Women's Federation, hence his name Ngapoi. (Note: Ngapoi's daughter was the mother of the 3rd Jamgön Kongtrül, an important reincarnate lama.)

== Career ==
Upon returning in 1932 from his studies in Britain, he served in the Tibetan army. Ngapoi began his career as a local official in Chamdo in 1936. As a cabinet member of the former government of Tibet under the Dalai Lama, he advocated reform. In April 1950 he was appointed governor-general (commissioner) of Chamdo, but took office only in September, after the previous governor, Lhalu, had left for Lhasa.

- Ngapoi Ngawang Jigme

Tibetan name
- Tibetan: ང་ཕོད་ངག་དབང་འཇིགས་མེད་
Transcriptions
- Wylie: Nga phod Ngag dbang 'jigs med
- Tibetan Pinyin: Ngapo Ngawang Jigmê
- Lhasa IPA: [ŋɑ̀pø̂ː ŋɑ̀wɑŋ t͡ɕíʔmi]

Chinese name
- Traditional Chinese: 阿沛·阿旺晉美
- Simplified Chinese: 阿沛·阿旺晋美
Transcriptions
Standard Mandarin
- Hanyu Pinyin: Āpèi Āwàng Jìnměi

=== Commander-in-chief of the Tibetan Army at Chamdo ===
While serving as governor-general of Chamdo, he also became commander-in-chief of the Tibetan Army.

While his predecessor, Lhalu, had made elaborate military plans and fortifications and asked the Kashag for more soldiers and weapons to stop the People's Liberation Army from entering Tibet, Ngapoi had the fortifications removed, refused to hire Khampa warriors and to install two portable wireless sets as he thought it was better to negotiate.

In October 1950, his forces confronted the People's Liberation Army. The battle was quickly over. As he had warned before his departure for Chamdo, "the Tibetan forces were no match for the PLA who [...] had liberated the whole of China by defeating several million Kuomintang soldiers". Ngapoi surrendered Chamdo to the Chinese. The PLA surprised him by treating him well and giving him long lectures on the New China's policies toward minor nationalities. Within a year, he was the deputy commander-in-chief for the PLA forces in Tibet. He became a leader not only of Tibet but also the Chinese Communist Party in Tibet.

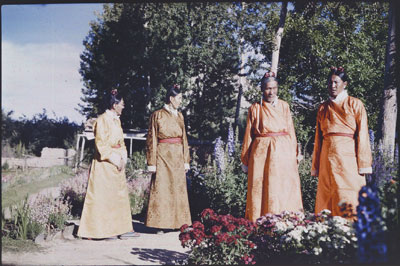
Tsipon Ngapoi is pictured 2nd from left at Dekyi Lingka in Lhasa, Tibet

=== Head of the Tibetan Delegation to the Beijing Peace Negotiations ===
As a delegate of the government of Tibet sent to negotiate with the Chinese Government, he headed the Tibetan delegation to the Beijing peace negotiations in 1951, where he signed the Seventeen Point Agreement with the Chinese Communist government in 1951, accepting Chinese sovereignty in exchange for guarantees of autonomy and religious freedom.

The validity of his acceptance on behalf of the Tibetan government has been questioned. The Tibetan exiled community claims that his signature of the Agreement was obtained under duress, and that, as only the governor of Chamdo, signature of the agreement exceeded his powers of representation and is therefore invalid.

In his biography My Land and My People, the Dalai Lama claims that in 1952, the acting Tibetan Prime Minister Lukhangwa told Chinese representative Zhang Jingwu that the Tibetan "people did not accept the agreement".

However, according to Sambo Rimshi, one of the Tibetan negotiators, the Tibetan delegation, including Ngapoi Ngawang Jigme, went to Beijing with the Dalai Lama's authorization and instructions. As Sambo Rimchi recalled, Dalai Lama's instruction to the negotiators clearly states:

Here are ten points. I have faith that you will not do anything bad, so you should go and achieve whatever you can.

According to Sambo, the young Dalai Lama also told the negotiators to use their best judgment according to the situation and circumstances and report back to the Kashag in Yadong. Sambo recalled that the negotiators brought a secret codebook so that they could establish a wireless link with Yadong and discuss issues as they arose. According to historians Tom A. Grunfeld, Melvyn C. Goldstein and Tsering Shakya, the young Dalai Lama did ratify the Seventeen Point agreement with Tsongdu Assembly's recommendation few months after the signing.

In 1959, the Dalai Lama on his arrival in India after he fled Tibet repudiated the "17-point Agreement" as having been "thrust upon Tibetan Government and people by the threat of arms".

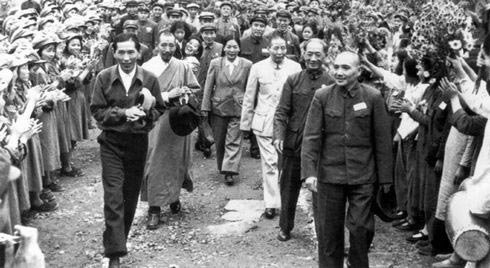
April 1951, Ngapoi (front left) in Chongqing with Deng Xiaoping (front right)

=== An advocate of reform ===
Ngapoi Ngawang Jigmé was one of a small number of progressive elite Tibetans that were eager to modernize Tibet and saw in the return of the Chinese an opportunity to do so. They were in a sense a continuation of the movement for reform that emerged in the 1920s with Tsarong Dzasa as its main proponent but was stopped short by the 13th Dalai Lama under the pressure of conservative clerics and aristocrats.

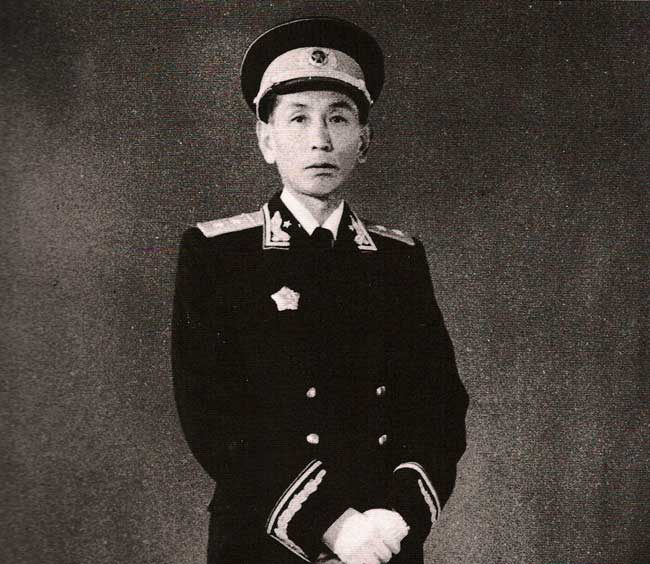
Lieutenant General Ngapoi photographed in his People's Liberation Army uniform in 1955

=== Implementing the Seventeen Point Agreement (1951–1952) ===
Ngapoi Ngawang Jigme was instrumental in solving the food problems of the People's Liberation Army in 1951–1952 by creating a Kashag subcommittee tasked with inventorying grain stores with a view to selling some to the PLA in accordance with point 16 of the Seventeen Point Agreement ("The local government of Tibet will assist the People's Liberation Army in the purchase of food, fodder, and other daily necessities").

=== A Kashag minister trusted by both the Chinese and the Dalai Lama (1953–1954) ===
Ngapoi was appointed by the Tibetan government to head the newly formed Reform Assembly. He was the Kashag minister (Kalön) most trusted not only by the Chinese but also by the Dalai Lama. The latter, who was in favour of reforms and modernization, frequently discussed political issues with Ngapoi in private. As a result, in 1953–1954, the Reform Assembly crafted new laws reforming interest rates, old loans, and the administration of counties.

=== Administrative, military, and legislative responsibilities ===
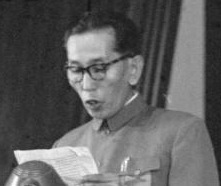
Ngapoi Ngawang Jigme at the First Session of the PRC's 1st National People's Congress

After 1951, Ngapoi's career continued within the ranks of Chinese Communist administration of Tibet. He served as the leader of the Liberation Committee of Chamdo Prefecture until 1959. He was also a member of the Central People's Government's State Ethnic Affairs Commission and the Chinese People's Political Consultative Conference National Committee between 1951 and 1954.

He was Deputy Commander of the Tibet Military District between 1952 and 1977, and a member of the National Defence Council from 1954 through the Cultural Revolution. He was appointed as lieutenant general and awarded the "Order of Liberation" first class in 1955.

==== Secretary General of the Preparatory Committee for the Tibet Autonomous Region ====
When in April 1956 a Preparatory Committee for the Establishment of the Autonomous Region of Tibet was set up in accordance with the central government's decision, Ngapoi Ngawang Jigme was appointed its secretary general. He was appointed vice-president of the Committee in 1959, the 10th Panchen Lama being its president.

==== Chairman of the People's Committee of the Tibet Autonomous Region ====
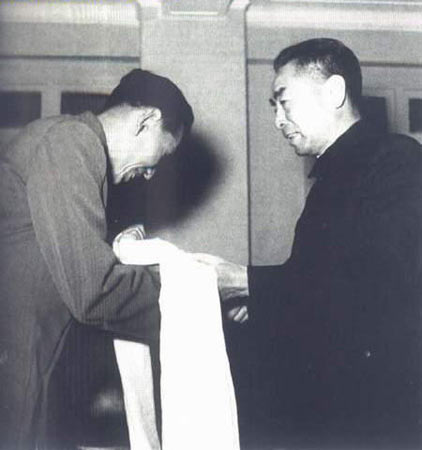
Ngapoi and Zhou Enlai in the 1950s

After his appointment as acting chairman of the Preparatory Committee of the Tibet Autonomous Region in 1964, Ngapoi Ngawang Jigme became the chairman of the People's Committee of the newly established Tibet Autonomous Region (TAR) in 1965.

==== Vice Chairman of the Standing Committee of the National People's Congress ====
He represented Tibet in seven National People's Congresses as a Vice Chairman of the Standing Committee from the 1st National People's Congress in 1954 to the 7th in 1988. He was head of the NPC delegations to Colombia, Guyana, West Indies, Sri Lanka and Nepal in the early 1980s.

In 1999, he became a member of the Preparatory Committee for the Special Administrative Region of Macau.

From 1979 to 1993, he was Chairman of the National People's Congress Ethnic Affairs Committee.

==== Other roles ====
He was an honorary president of the Buddhist Association of China beginning in 1980. He was also an honorary president of the Tibetan Wildlife Protection Association, which was founded in 1991. In April 1992, he became chairman of the newly established Aid Tibet Development Foundation. He was also president of the China Association for the Preservation and Development of Tibetan Culture, which was established on June 21, 2004.

== Death ==
Ngapoi died at 16:50 on December 23, 2009, from an unspecified illness in Beijing at the age of 99 (or 100 according to East Asia's custom of counting a person's age by starting from one at the time of his or her birth). His funeral was held at the Funeral Parlor of the Babaoshan Revolutionary Cemetery on the morning of December 28.

He was described as "a great patriot, renowned social activist, good son of Tibetan people, outstanding leader of China's ethnic work and close friend of the CPC", by the Central Committee of the Chinese Communist Party.

Almost all the top leaders of the Chinese Communist Party turned up to pay him respects at his funeral, including CCP general secretary Hu Jintao, ex-general secretary Jiang Zemin, Wu Bangguo, Wen Jiabao, Jia Qinglin, Li Changchun, Xi Jinping, He Guoqiang, Zhou Yongkang, etc.

The Tibetan government in exile headed by Prof. Samdhong Rinpoche called him an "honest and patriotic" person who made great efforts to preserve and promote the Tibetan language. "He was someone who upheld the spirit of the Tibetan people."

As journalist Kalsang Rinchen observes, both Beijing and Dharamsala appear saddened by the demise of the man who signed the 17-point agreement. "[The] Chinese state run news agency Xinhua hailed him for ushering in 'major milestones in Tibet, such as the democratic reforms and the founding of the Autonomous Regional Government,' while the Tibetan government in exile remembered him for calling on the Central Government in 1991 'to implement articles of the 17-point Agreement in general and specifically those articles which state that Tibet's political status will not be changed'."

== Depiction ==
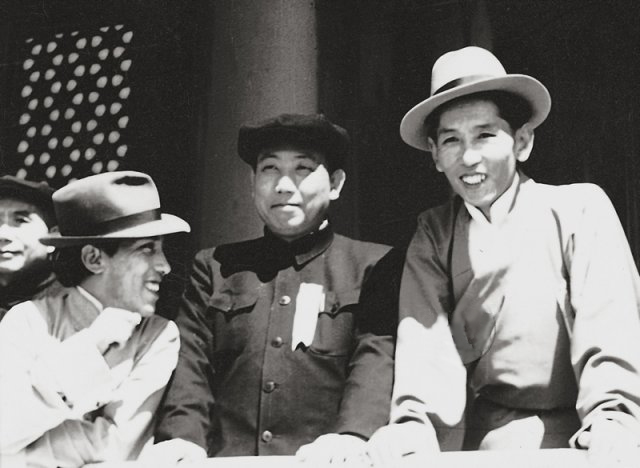
Phuntsok Tashi Takla, Zhandong Jinjimei and Ngapoi Ngawang Jigme

In the 1997 film Seven Years in Tibet, based on the memoir of the Austrian explorer and mountaineer Heinrich Harrer, Ngapoi Ngawang Jigme is played by the actor BD Wong. In the movie he is depicted as being responsible for destroying a Tibetan ammunition depot, thus sealing the defeat of the Lhasa loyalist army at Chamdo.

== Published works ==
- Ngapo Ngawang Jigmei et al., Tibet (with a foreword by Harrison Salisbury), Edmonton: Hurtig Publishers, or New York: McGraw-Hill Book Company, 1981, 296 p. (a coffee-table book)
- On the 1959 Armed Rebellion, in China Report, 1988, vol. 24, pp. 377–382.
- A great Turn in the Development of Tibetan History, published in the first issue of the China Tibetology quarterly, Beijing, 1991 / Grand tournant historique au Tibet, in La Tibétologie en Chine, n° 1, 1991.
- On Tibetan Issues, Beijing, New Star Publishers, 1991.
- Narrator in Masters of the Roof of the Wind, a documentary on feudalism in old Tibet
- Ngapoi recalls the founding of the TAR, an interview published by Chinaview, on August 30, 2005.

== Notes ==
Government offices
Preceded by Choekyi Gyaltsen	Chairman of Tibet Autonomous Region; 1964–1968	Succeeded by Zeng Yongya
Preceded by Tian Bao	Chairman of Tibet Autonomous Region; 1981–1983	Succeeded by Doje Cedain (多杰才旦)
Assembly seats
Preceded by	President of Tibet Autonomous Region People's Congress; 1979–1981	Succeeded by Yang Dongsheng
Preceded by Yang Dongsheng	President of Tibet Autonomous Region People's Congress; 1983–1993	Succeeded by Raidi
