= Dainkognubma =

Coordinates: 32°26′N 97°58′E

Dainkognubma is a village in the Tibet Autonomous Region of China with a latitude (DMS) of 32°26'N and a longitude of 97°58'E. It lies at an altitude of 4,039 metres (13,254 feet).

The village is located 26.1 miles (42.0 km) east of Banggaidoi and 6.5 miles (10.5 km) south of Sainkog. It lies 33.6 miles (54.1 km) north of Norma.

== Other nearby villages ==
- Dêrdoin, 32 miles (51 km) south
- Goinsargoin, 30.4 miles (48.9 km) south

== See also ==
- List of towns and villages in Tibet
