= Garma Cedain =

Chinese politician of Tibetan ethnicity

- སྐར་མ་ཚེ་བརྟན
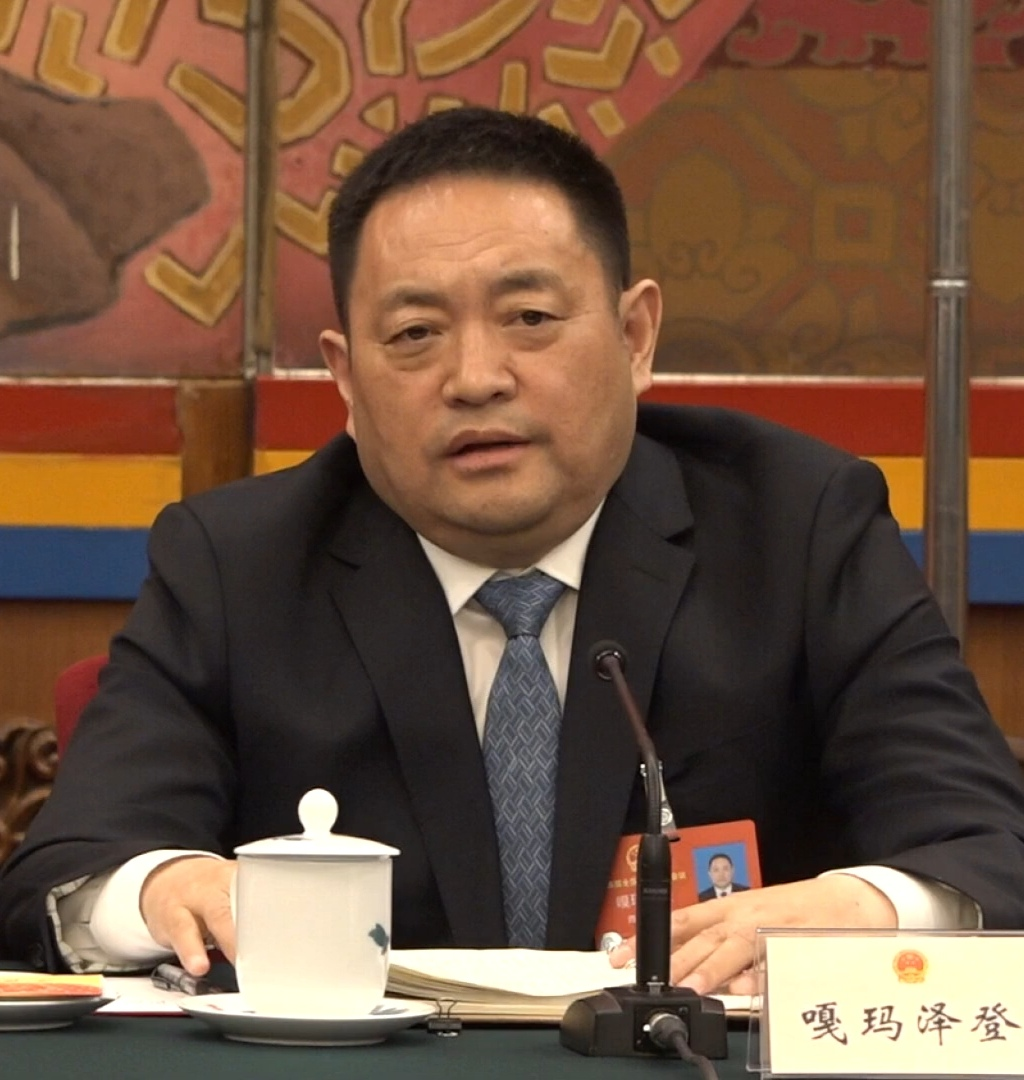
- Garma Cedain at the 2025 National People's Congress

Chairman of Tibet
- Incumbent
- Assumed office 22 January 2025 (acting from 28 November 2024)
- Preceded by: Yan Jinhai

Vice Chairman of the Tibet Autonomous Regional Committee of the Chinese People's Political Consultative Conference
- Incumbent
- Assumed office January 2022
- Chairman: Pagbalha Geleg Namgyai

Personal details
- Born: December 1967 (age 58) Jomda County, Tibet Autonomous Region, China
- Party: Chinese Communist Party
- Education: Minzu University of China; Central Party School of the Chinese Communist Party; Sichuan University

Chinese name
- Simplified Chinese: 嘎玛泽登
- Traditional Chinese: 嘎瑪澤登
Transcriptions
Standard Mandarin
- Hanyu Pinyin: Gāmǎ zédēn

Garma Cedain (Tibetan: སྐར་མ་ཚེ་བརྟན; Chinese: 嘎玛泽登; born December 1967), also spelled Karma Tseten, is a Chinese politician of Tibetan ethnicity who is a current chairman of Tibet.

He is an alternate of the 20th Central Committee of the Chinese Communist Party.

== Biography ==
Garma Cedain was born in Jomda County, Tibet Autonomous Region, in December 1967. In 1986, he entered the Minzu University of China, where he majored in ethnic theories and policies.

After graduating in July 1990, he was despatched as an official to the CCP Naqu Prefectural Committee. He joined the Chinese Communist Party (CCP) in May 1992. He was deputy party secretary of Nyima County in July 1995, in addition to serving as magistrate since October 2017. After a short term as deputy party secretary and magistrate of Naqu County (now Seni District) from April 2001 to October 2002, he was appointed secretary-general of the Naqu Prefectural People's Government. He became vice governor of Naqu Prefecture July 2015. He was appointed executive vice governor of Naqu Prefecture in January 2008 and was admitted to member of the Standing Committee of the CCP Naqu Prefectural Committee, the prefecture's top authority. He was made executive deputy secretary of Naqu Prefecture in December 2011, concurrently serving as secretary of the Political and Legal Affairs Commission and secretary of the Public Security Department.

He was deputy secretary-general of Tibet Autonomous Regional People's Government in October 2012 and subsequently executive deputy director and deputy party branch secretary of the Tibet Autonomous Regional Tourism Development Commission in June 2015. In May 2017, he became deputy party branch secretary of the Tibet Autonomous Regional Civil Affairs, rising to party branch secretary the next year.

In October 2020, he took office as director of the Department of Science, Technology and Education of the Ministry of Culture and Tourism, but having held the position for only a year.

In October 2021, he was transferred back to Tibet Autonomous Region and was admitted to member of the Standing Committee of the CCP Tibet Autonomous Regional Committee, the region's top authority. In December 2021, he was chosen as head of the United Front Work Department of the CCP Tibet Autonomous Regional Committee, concurrently serving as vice chairman of the Tibet Autonomous Regional Committee of the Chinese People's Political Consultative Conference since January 2022.

On 28 October 2024, Garma Cedain was appointed party branch secretary of Tibet Autonomous Region, succeeding Yan Jinhai.

Party political offices
Preceded by Tangod	Head of the United Front Work Department of the Tibet Autonomous Regional Committee of the Chinese Communist Party; 2021–2024	Succeeded by Sonam Nyima
Government offices
Preceded by Yan Jinhai	Chairman of Tibet; 2024–present	Incumbent
