= Tangpu =

Tangpu may refer to the following locations in China:

- Tongpu Township (同普乡), Jomda County, Tibet
- Tangpu, Jiangxi (棠浦镇), town in Yifeng County
- Tangpu, Zhejiang (汤浦镇), town in Shangyu
