= Yangling Dorje =

Chinese politician of Tibetan ethnicity (1931–2026)

- ཡངས་གླིང་རྡོ་རྗེ

Vice Chairman of the Sichuan Provincial Committee of the Chinese People's Political Consultative Conference
- In office May 1986 – January 1998
- Chairman: Feng Yuanwei; Liao Bokang; Nie Ronggui

Chairman of the Tibet Autonomous Regional Committee of the Chinese People's Political Consultative Conference
- In office April 1984 – May 1986
- Preceded by: Yin Fatang
- Succeeded by: Raidi

Personal details
- Born: April 1931 Batang County, Chuanbian Special Administrative District, China
- Died: 6 April 2026 (aged 95) Chengdu, Sichuan, China
- Party: Chinese Communist Party
- Education: Ba'an Normal School

Chinese name
- Simplified Chinese: 杨岭多吉
- Traditional Chinese: 楊嶺多吉
Transcriptions
Standard Mandarin
- Hanyu Pinyin: Yánglǐng Duōjí

Yangling Dorje (Tibetan: ཡངས་གླིང་རྡོ་རྗེ, Wylie: yangs gling rdo rje; Chinese: 杨岭多吉; April 1931 – 6 April 2026) was a Chinese politician of Tibetan ethnicity who served as chairman of the Tibet Autonomous Regional Committee of the Chinese People's Political Consultative Conference from 1983 to 1986 and vice chairman of the Sichuan Provincial Committee of the Chinese People's Political Consultative Conference from 1986 to 1998.

Yangling was a delegate to the 7th National People's Congress and an alternate of the 12th Central Committee of the Chinese Communist Party.

== Life and career ==
Yangling Dorje was born in Batang County, Chuanbian Special Administrative District, in April 1931.

He entered the workforce in September 1949 and joined the Chinese Communist Party in October of that same year. In 1957, he became an alternate member of the Central Committee of the Communist Youth League of China. He was first party secretary of Ngawa Tibetan and Qiang Autonomous Prefecture in 1975, and held that office until 1979. In December 1979, he was promoted to become deputy governor of Sichuan, a position he held until March 1981.

Yangling was appointed party secretary of Tibet Autonomous Region in December 1980, concurrently serving as vice chairman of Tibet Autonomous Region and chairman of the Tibet Autonomous Regional Committee of the Chinese People's Political Consultative Conference.

He became vice chairman of the Sichuan Provincial Committee of the Chinese People's Political Consultative Conference in May 1986, and served until January 1998.

Yangling died on 6 April 2026, at the age of 95.

Assembly seats
Preceded by Yin Fatang	Chairman of the Tibet Autonomous Regional Committee of the Chinese People's Political Consultative Conference; 1983–1986	Succeeded by Raidi
