= Yin Fatang =

Chinese politician and military officer (1922–2025)

- 阴法唐

Party Secretary of Tibet
- In office March 1980 – 1 June 1985
- Preceded by: Ren Rong
- Succeeded by: Wu Jinghua

Personal details
- Born: July 1922 Feicheng, Shandong, China
- Died: June 20, 2025 (aged 102) Beijing, China
- Party: Chinese Communist Party
- Awards: Order of Independence and Freedom (Second class); Order of Liberation (Second class)

Military service
- Allegiance: People's Republic of China
- Branch/service: People's Liberation Army Ground Force
- Years of service: 1938–1998
- Rank: Lieutenant General
- Battles/wars: Second Sino-Japanese War; Chinese Civil War; Annexation of Tibet by the People's Republic of China; 1959 Tibetan uprising 1962 Sino-Indian War

Yin Fatang (Chinese: 阴法唐; July 1922 – 20 June 2025) was a Chinese politician and military officer.

A native of Zhanglizhuang, Taoyuan Township, Feicheng, Shandong Province, he served as the First Secretary of the Tibet Autonomous Regional Committee of the Chinese Communist Party and as Deputy Political Commissar of the Second Artillery of the People's Liberation Army, holding the rank of Lieutenant General.

== Life and career ==
In 1937, Yin completed his studies at Tai'an No. 3 Junior High School and subsequently graduated from Shandong Senior Vocational School in Jinan. In May 1938, during the Second Sino-Japanese War, he enlisted in the People's Anti-Enemy Self-Defense Regiment of the Western District of Shandong, established and directed by the CCP East Shandong Provincial Committee, and became a member of the CCP in June 1938. In July 1938, Yin joined the Feicheng County Security Guard under the auspices of the CCP, which was restructured into the Seventeenth Detachment, commanded by Fan Zhuxian (Chinese: 范筑先), in October, and subsequently transformed into the Sixth Detachment of the Shandong Column of the Eighth Route Army in November, operating in Tai'an, Feicheng, and surrounding counties. He held the positions of company political teacher and battalion branch secretary. In 1940, he held the position of organization officer for the 343rd Brigade of the 115th Division, which was subsequently renamed the second sub-district of the Ji-Lu-Yu Border Region (Chinese: 冀鲁豫军区). In 1941, he ascended to the role of political commissar for the Pu County Brigade and became a member of the CCP Pu County Committee. In 1945, he held the positions of deputy director of the political office and director of the Independent Regiment.

In the course of the Second Nationalist-Communist War, he held the positions of director of the political office of the 58th Regiment of the 1st Column, political commissar of the 59th Regiment (subsequently reclassified as the 143rd Regiment of the 52nd Division of the 18th Corps of the 5th Corps), regimental commander, and political commissar of the Jin-Hei-Yu Military Region (later designated as the 2nd Field Army). He commanded his forces at the Battle of Longhai, the Battle of Southwest Shandong, the Leap into the Dabie Mountains, and orchestrated the Battle of Gaoshanpu. During the Huaihai Campaign, he commanded his forces in the fight of Xiaomazhuang. Following his leadership in the Battle of the Yangtze River Crossing, he was tasked with chasing and annihilating the Nationalist forces under Song Xilian during the Battle of Southwest (Chinese: 西南战役).

In 1950, he held the position of deputy political commissar of the 52nd Division of the 18th Army of the Second Field Army and directed his division in the mission to enter and develop Tibet. He and Li Ming (Chinese: 李明), Chief of Staff of the Division, led the Right Route Army, initiated the Battle of Chamdo in early October 1950, defeated the primary contingent of the Tibetan Army, and secured victory in the Battle of Chamdo, establishing the groundwork for the political and peaceful independence of Tibet. Subsequently, he held positions as a member of the Chamdo Liberation Committee, political commissar of the Gyantse Military Sub-district in Tibet, secretary of the CCP's Tibet Gyantse Sub-committee (which eventually evolved into a local committee), and a member of the Tibet Work Committee. In 1955, he attained the rank of colonel and received the Order of Independence and Freedom (2nd Class) and the Order of Liberation (2nd Class).

He participated in and led the repression of the Tibetan uprising in 1959, and was designated as the front-line commander for the counter-offensive campaign against India by the Indian government in 1962. In 1962, following India's incursion into Tibet, Yin was appointed the political commissar of the Frontline Command for the Counterattack Operation against India. Following the victory in the Sino-Indian War, he was one of five officers received by Chairman Mao Zedong and was elevated to the rank of colonel. In 1963, he assumed the position of director of the Political Department of the Tibet Military Region.

He was persecuted during the Cultural Revolution for opposing Lin Biao's actions. In 1971, he was reassigned from Tibet and became deputy director of the political department of the Fuzhou Military Region, subsequently being promoted to director. In 1975, he was reinstated as the director of the political department of the Jinan Military Region, and by the end of 1978, he ascended to the position of deputy political commissar of the Jinan Military Region.

In 1980, he entered Tibet for a second time and was designated by the Central Committee of the Chinese Communist Party as the first secretary of the Party Committee for the Tibet Autonomous Region. Concurrently, he was appointed by the CCP Central Military Commission as deputy political commissar of the Chengdu Military Region and first political commissar of the Tibet Military Region. During this time, he was chosen First Secretary of the Party Committee of the Tibet Military Region and Chairman of the Third Tibetan Committee of the Chinese People's Political Consultative Conference. Throughout his tenure, he instituted numerous programs to redirect the emphasis of work towards economic development, resulting in a significant transformation in Tibet. He remained doubting of some of the liberalization policies of Xi Zhongxun in Tibet, as well as skeptical of the Choekyi Gyaltsen, 10th Panchen Lama. Regarding the 14th Dalai Lama, Yin said "his greatest mistake is treason" and that he can return to China only "as long as he has patriotic feeling and is willing to admit his mistakes".

On 1 June, he was removed as Party Secretary of Tibet. In July 1985, he was sent from Tibet to serve as the deputy political commissar of the PLA Second Artillery. He attained the rank of lieutenant general in 1988 and received the Medal of Honor for Independent Merit. He viewed this move as a demotion, writing in his memoirs that some had "cried out against the injustice".

Yin served as a delegate to the Fifth, Sixth, Seventh, and Eighth National People's Congresses, was a member of the Standing Committee of the Seventh and Eighth National People's Congresses, and participated in the Committee of Internal and Judicial Affairs, among other roles. Furthermore, he was elected as a delegate to the 12th and 13th Central Committee of the Chinese Communist Party.

Yin died in Beijing on 20 June 2025, at the age of 102.

== See also ==
- Battle of Chamdo
- 149th Motorized Infantry Division (People's Republic of China)
- 43 Aid Projects to Tibet

Party political offices
Preceded by Ren Rong	Communist Party Secretary of Xizang; 1980–1985	Succeeded by Wu Jinghua
