= Ngapoi Cedain Zhoigar =

Ngapoi Cedain Zhoigar (Tibetan: ང་ཕོད་ཚེ་བརྟན་སྒྲོལ་དཀར་, Wylie: nga phod tshe brtan sgrol dkar, ZWPY: Ngapoi Cedain Zhoigar, Chinese: 阿沛·才旦卓嘎, pinyin: Āpèi Cáidàn Zhuógá; September 1915 – 24 May 2012) was a member of the Tibetan aristocratic Ngapoi clan. Since the founding of the PRC, she served as the Vice President of the Tibetan Women's Federation. She was married to Ngapoi Ngawang Jigme. The couple had 12 children.
