= Karma Gorge =

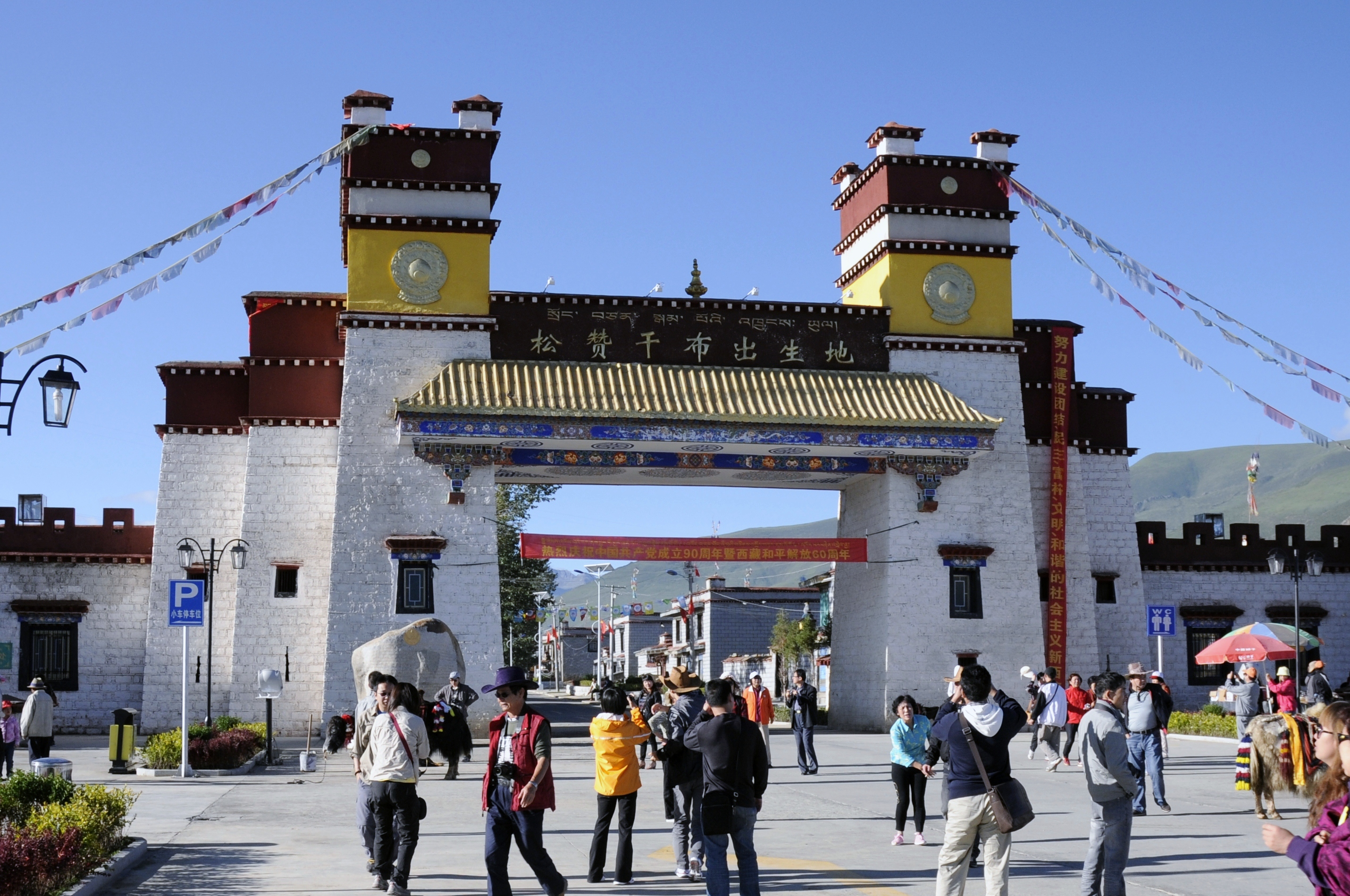
Songtsen Gampo's birthplace

Karma Gully (甲玛沟), or Karma Gorge, is located 15 kilometers west of Mozhugongka County, Lhasa, Tibet Autonomous Region.

== Geography ==
Karma Gorge can be reached along National Highway 318. The average altitude of Karma Gorge is around 4,000 meters above sea level. There are many attractions in Karma Gorge, such as the palace ruins of "Jangpa Minjurin", the birthplace of Songtsen Gampo. The site of the Karma Palace of the Tubo Kingdom exists in the gully.

It is the birthplace of the former Vice Chairman of the CPPCC Ngapoi Ngawang Jigme. Karma Chikang is one of the ancient paths leading to Samye Monastery, which is just one mountain away from it, making it an interesting hiking tour.
