= Tibet Autonomous Region Commission for Discipline Inspection =

The Tibet Autonomous Region Commission for Discipline Inspection (Chinese: 中国共产党西藏自治区纪律检查委员会 Tibetan: ཀྲུང་གོ་གུང་ཁྲན་ཏང་བོད་རང་སྐྱོང་ལྗོངས་སྒྲིག་ཁྲིམས་ཞིབ་བཤེར་ཨུ་ཡོན་ལྷན་ཁང་།), or CCP TAR Discipline Inspection Committee (Chinese: 中共西藏自治区纪委) for short, is a provincial-level disciplinary organ of the Chinese Communist Party under the Central Commission for Discipline Inspection, co-located with the Supervisory Committee of the Tibet Autonomous Region.

== History ==
In 1952, the Discipline Inspection Committee of the CCP Tibet Work Committee was established, and in 1956, it was renamed the Supervision Committee of the Tibet Work Committee. During the Cultural Revolution, the work of disciplinary inspection was interrupted, and in 1979 it was resumed and renamed as the Disciplinary Inspection Committee of the Tibet Autonomous Region Commission.
