= Doje Cezhug =

Doje Cezhug (Tibetan: རྡོ་རྗེ་ཚེས་དྲུག; Chinese: 多吉次珠; born December 1962) is an ethnic Tibetan politician in the People's Republic of China. He was the mayor of Lhasa between 2007 and 2013 and currently serves as the Vice Chairman of the Tibet Autonomous Region. He is an outspoken critic of the Dalai Lama for his alleged role in instigating the 2008 Lhasa violence and pursues a growth-based economic policy in Lhasa anchored in tourism.

== 2008 violence ==
Cezhug rose to prominence as a critic of the 2008 Lhasa violence, and its alleged instigators, the advisors of the Dalai Lama. He published an article in China Daily on April 1 of that year, titled "Do you call this peaceful?" In it, he rejects characterizations of the riots as "peaceful demonstrations", and mocks the "hypocrisy" of the Dalai Lama claiming to represent peace and nonviolence. 18 civilians have died and 250 million yuan were lost in the violence. Soon after, though, Cezhug was safely able to attend the national PCC conference, where he announced that Lhasa was calm and that he did not have to impose martial law. The mayor accepted some criticism of his policies, saying "The March 14 riot exposed some problems and they have now all been solved". In the two years since the riot, the "floating population" has been more strictly controlled, and living standards have increased, says the mayor.

== Economic policy ==
Cezhug has said that "sabotage from the Dalai Lama group remains the biggest obstacle in the way of Tibet's development". He believes that Lhasa's economy is driven by tourism, and riots instigated by the group can deter tourists. Cezhug aims to revitalize the city with more aggressive tax cuts and reinforcement of public security. The mayor defends his campaign of modernization, saying "Nowadays, Tibetan people have been living a modern life while enjoying the development of traditional Tibetan culture."

Political offices
Preceded by Norbu Dongrub (罗布顿珠)	Mayor of Lhasa; 2007 – 2013	Succeeded by Zhang Yanqing (张延清)
