= Legqog =

Chinese politician

- ལེགས་མཆོག 列确

Chairman of the Standing Committee of the Tibet Autonomous Region People's Congress
- In office May 2003 – January 2010
- Preceded by: Raidi
- Succeeded by: Qiangba Puncog

Chairman of Tibet
- In office May 1998 – April 2003
- Preceded by: Gyaincain Norbu
- Succeeded by: Qiangba Puncog

Personal details
- Born: October 1944 (age 81) Gyantse, Tibet
- Party: Chinese Communist Party

Legqog

Chinese name
- Traditional Chinese: 列確
- Simplified Chinese: 列确
Transcriptions
Standard Mandarin
- Hanyu Pinyin: Lièquè

Tibetan name
- Tibetan: ལེགས་མཆོག
Transcriptions
- Wylie: legs mchog
- Tibetan Pinyin: Legqog

Legqog (Tibetan: ལེགས་མཆོག, Chinese: 列确, born October 1944), and a native of Gyantse, Tibet, was a Tibetan political figure in the People's Republic of China.

== Biography ==
Legqog was born in Gyantse County, Tibet in October 1944. He joined the Chinese Communist Party in 1972. From June 1973 to January 1975, he served as secretary of the Youth League Committee of Gyantse County, Tibet, member of the County Committee, and member of the Standing Committee of the Communist Youth League of Shigatse; in January 1980, he became Deputy Director of the Organization Department of the CCP Tibet Autonomous Region Committee. In August 1980, he became deputy director of the Organization Department of the Party Committee of the Tibet Autonomous Region; in December 1991, he became a member of the Standing Committee of the Fourth CCP Committee of the Tibet Autonomous Region and secretary of the CCP Lhasa Municipal Committee; in November 1994, he became deputy secretary of the Party Committee of the Tibet Autonomous Region and secretary of the CCP Lhasa Municipal Committee.

In April 1995, he was appointed vice-chairman of the TAR People's Government at the thirteenth meeting of the Sixth Standing Committee of the TAR People's Congress. In August 1995, he was elected deputy secretary of the Fifth CCP Tibet Autonomous Region Committee. In May 1998, he was elected chairman of the TAR Government at the first meeting of the Seventh Session of the TAR People's Congress. In May 2003, he was elected chairman of the Eighth Standing Committee of the TAR People's Congress. From January 2008 to January 2010, he served as Chairman of the Standing Committee of the Ninth National People's Congress of the Tibet Autonomous Region.

In March 2008, he became Vice-Chairman of the Ethnic Affairs Committee of the National People's Congress.

Political offices
Preceded by Gyaincain Norbu	Chairman of Tibet; 1998–2004	Succeeded by Qiangba Puncog
Preceded by Raidi	President of Tibet Autonomous Region People's Congress; 2003–2010	Succeeded by Qiangba Puncog
