= Raidi =

Tibetan politician (1938–2025)

- རག་སྡི་ 热地

Vice Chairman of the Standing Committee of the National People's Congress
- In office 15 March 2003 – 15 March 2008
- Chairman: Wu Bangguo

Chairman of the Tibet Autonomous Region People's Congress
- In office January 1993 – May 2003
- Preceded by: Ngapoi Ngawang Jigme
- Succeeded by: Legqog

Chairman of the Tibet Autonomous Regional Committee of the Chinese People's Political Consultative Conference
- In office May 1985 – January 1993
- Preceded by: Yangling Dorje
- Succeeded by: Pagbalha Geleg Namgyai

Personal details
- Born: August 1938 Biru, Tibet
- Died: 6 June 2025 (aged 86) Beijing, China
- Party: Chinese Communist Party
- Education: Central Party School

Chinese name
- Simplified Chinese: 热地
- Traditional Chinese: 熱地
Transcriptions
Standard Mandarin
- Hanyu Pinyin: Rèdì

Tibetan name
- Tibetan: རག་སྡི་
Transcriptions
- Wylie: rag sdi
- Tibetan Pinyin: Raidi

Raidi (Chinese: 热地; Tibetan: རག་སྡི་; also written Ragdi; August 1938 – 6 June 2025) was a Tibetan politician of the People's Republic of China. He served as a vice chairman of the Standing Committee of the National People's Congress from 2003 to 2008, and was the highest-ranking Tibetan in the People's Republic of China.

== Life and career ==
Raidi was a native of Biru, Tibet. Born in August 1938, he was a graduate of the Central Party School of the Chinese Communist Party, and joined the Chinese Communist Party (CCP) in October 1961. He was formerly a Buddhist monk.

Between 1966 and 1968, Raidi was employed by the Public Prosecution and Law Enforcement Commission of the Nagqu Prefecture in the Tibet Autonomous Region. From 1968 to 1972, he held the position of officer and deputy chairman of the People's Security Group under the Nagqu Regional Revolutionary Committee of the Tibet Autonomous Region. He held the position of Secretary of the Nagqu Prefecture CCP Committee from 1972 until 1975.

He occupied numerous roles, including Deputy Secretary of the Tibet Autonomous Regional Committee of the Chinese Communist Party, Disciplinary Commissioner of the Tibet Autonomous Region, Deputy Director of the Tibet Autonomous Region Revolutionary Committee, Deputy Director of the Standing Committee of the Tibet Autonomous Region People's Congress, Chairman of the Tibet Autonomous Regional Committee of the Chinese People's Political Consultative Conference, and President of the Tibet Autonomous Region Party School.

From 1993 to 1994, he held the positions of Deputy Secretary of the Tibet Autonomous Region Party Committee, Director of the Standing Committee of the Tibet Autonomous Region People's Congress, and Party Secretary. From 1994 until 2003, he held the position of Standing Deputy Secretary of the Tibet Autonomous Region Party Committee and served as the Director of the Standing Committee of the Party Group Secretary of the Tibet Autonomous Region. He held the position of Vice Chairperson of the Standing Committee of the National People's Congress from March 2003 until March 2008.

On 16 September 2019, he received the national honorary designation of "Outstanding Contributor to Ethnic Unity".

Raidi interacted with foreign journalists multiple times during his political career, discussing issues such as tourism in Tibet, the status of the Dalai Lama, the Karmapa Lama, and the disappearance of the 11th Panchen Lama. He was a fierce critic of "splitism", or Tibetan nationalism, and often criticized claims that Tibetans were oppressed by the Chinese government.

Raidi died in Beijing on 6 June 2025, at the age of 86.

Assembly seats
Preceded by Yangling Dorje	Chairman of the Tibet Autonomous Regional Committee of the Chinese People's Political Consultative Conference; 1985–1993	Succeeded by Pagbalha Geleg Namgyai
Preceded by Ngapoi Ngawang Jigme	Chairman of Tibet Autonomous Region People's Congress Standing Committee; 1993–2003	Succeeded by Legqog
