= Bolo Township, Jomda County =

Bolo Township 波罗乡 • སྤོ
- Township
- Location within Tibet
- Coordinates: 31°11′37″N 98°35′52″E
- Country: China
- Autonomous region: Tibet
- Prefecture-level city: Chamdo
- County: Jomda County

Area
  - Total: 1,043.77 km^{2} (403.00 sq mi)

Population (2018)
  - Total: 8,135
  - Density: 7.794/km^{2} (20.19/sq mi)

Bolo Township (སྤོ་, simplified Chinese: 波罗乡; traditional Chinese: 波羅鄉; pinyin: Bōluó Xiāng) is a township in Jomda County, Chamdo, Tibet Autonomous Region, China. Bolo Township spans an area of 1,043.77 square kilometres (403.00 mi^{2}), and has a population of 8,135 as of 2018.

== Administrative divisions ==
Bolo Township is divided into eight administrative villages.

- Guse Village (Chinese: 古色村)
- Chongsang Village (Chinese: 冲桑村)
- Waichong Village (Chinese: 外冲村)
- Adang Village (Chinese: 阿当村)
- Reduo Village (Chinese: 热多村)
- Epeng Village (Chinese: 俄彭村)
- Ningba Village (Chinese: 宁巴村)
- Bogong Village (Chinese: 波公村)

== Culture ==
Tibetan woodblock printing reportedly has its origins in a village in Bolo Township. The village has 60 woodblock artists who practice woodblock printing for more than eight months per year. The village's artists state that the art has been practiced in their village for over 300 years.
