= Yan Jinhai =

Chinese politician

- ཡན་ཅིན་ཧའེ 严金海
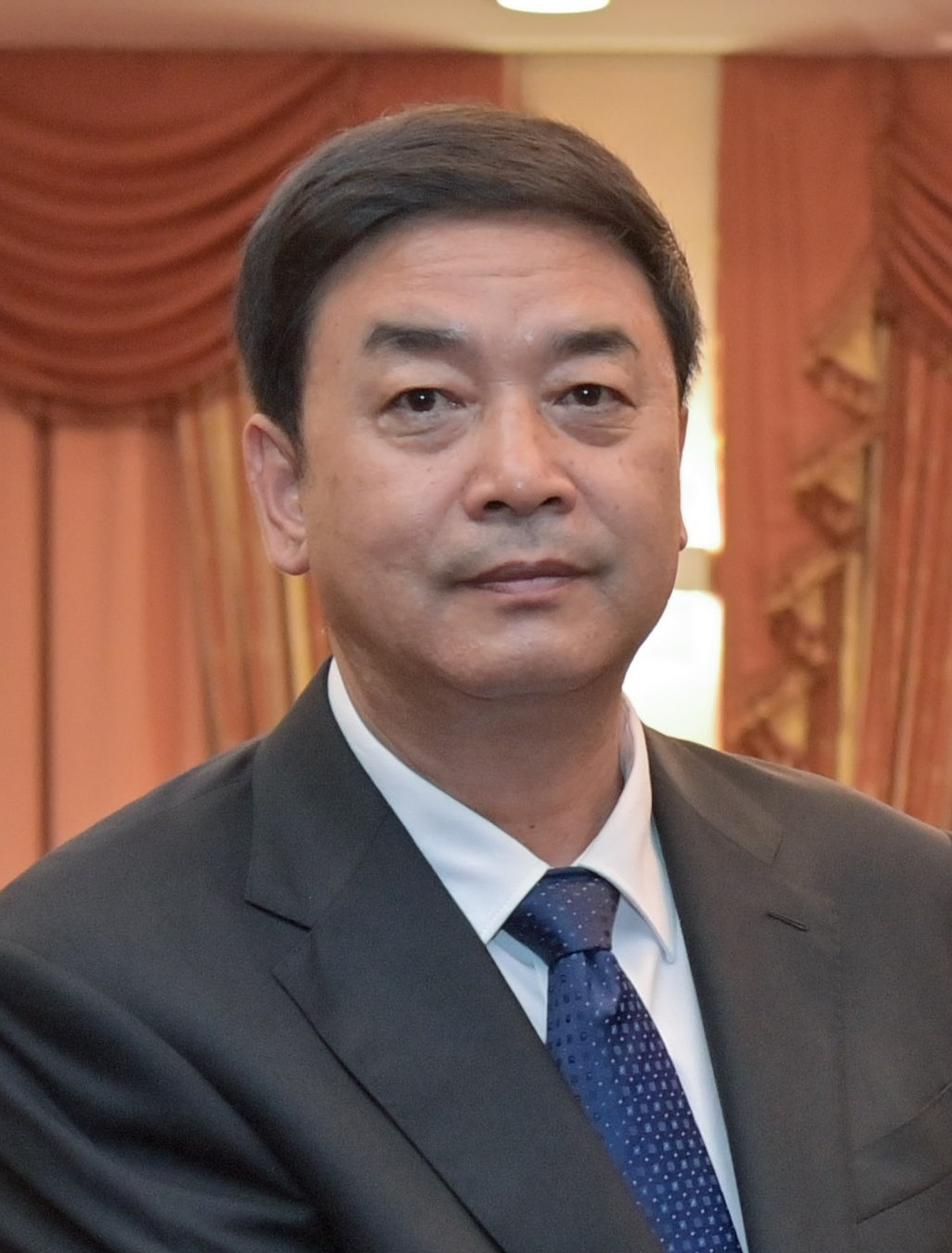
- Yan in 2023

Chairman of the Standing Committee of the Tibet Autonomous Region People's Congress
- Incumbent
- Assumed office 22 January 2025
- Preceded by: Losang Jamcan

Chairman of Tibet
- In office 8 October 2021 – 28 November 2024
- Party Secretary: Wang Junzheng
- Preceded by: Che Dalha
- Succeeded by: Garma Cedain

Party Secretary of Lhasa
- In office 18 January 2021 – 7 January 2022
- Preceded by: Padma Wangdu
- Succeeded by: Phurbu Dondrup

Personal details
- Born: March 1962 (age 64) Minhe Hui and Tu Autonomous County, Qinghai, China
- Party: Chinese Communist Party
- Education: Qinghai University for Nationalities

Chinese name
- Simplified Chinese: 严金海
- Traditional Chinese: 嚴金海
Transcriptions
Standard Mandarin
- Hanyu Pinyin: Yán Jīnhǎi

Tibetan name
- Tibetan: ཡན་ཅིན་ཧའེ
Transcriptions
- Wylie: yan cin ha'e
- Tibetan Pinyin: Yänjinhae

Yan Jinhai (Chinese: 严金海; Tibetan: ཡན་ཅིན་ཧའེ; born March 1962) is a Chinese politician of Tibetan ethnicity who was the deputy secretary of the Chinese Communist Party Tibet Committee and chairman of the Tibet Autonomous Region, in office from October 2021 to November 2024. Previously he served as party secretary of Lhasa, the capital of Tibet Autonomous Region.

He was a delegate to the 11th National People's Congress. He is a representative of the 19th National Congress of the Chinese Communist Party and an alternate of the 19th Central Committee of the Chinese Communist Party.

== Early life and education ==
Yan was born in Minhe Hui and Tu Autonomous County, Qinghai, in March 1962. In 1978, he enrolled at Qinghai University for Nationalities, majoring in Chinese. After graduating in 1982, he taught at Huangnan Normal School for Nationalities.

== Career in Qinghai ==
He joined the Chinese Communist Party (CCP) in December 1983. He began his political career in November 1984, when he became an official in the Education Bureau of Huangnan Tibetan Autonomous Prefecture. In February 1990, he became deputy director of the Office of the CCP Huangnan Tibetan Autonomous Prefecture Committee, rising to director the next year. He served as deputy secretary-general of the CCP Huangnan Tibetan Autonomous Prefecture Committee in July 1993, and three years later promoted to the secretary-general position. At the same time, he was admitted to member of the standing committee of the CCP Huangnan Tibetan Autonomous Prefecture Committee, the prefecture's top authority.

He became deputy party secretary of Yushu Tibetan Autonomous Prefecture in June 1998 before being assigned to the similar position in Haibei Tibetan Autonomous Prefecture in January 2005. In 2005, he was named acting governor of Haibei Tibetan Autonomous Prefecture, and was installed in March 2005. In February 2008, he was promoted to party secretary, the top political position in the prefecture. It would be his first job as "first-in-charge" of a prefecture.

He was appointed vice governor of Qinghai in January 2013 and in May 2017 was admitted to member of the standing committee of the CCP Qinghai Provincial Committee, the province's top authority.

== Career in Tibet ==
In July 2020, he was transferred to southwest China's Tibet Autonomous Region and appointed deputy party secretary, concurrently serving as party secretary of Lhasa since 18 January 2021. On 8 October 2021, he was appointed chairman of Tibet Autonomous Region, succeeding Che Dalha.

Government offices
Preceded by Nyima Droma	Governor of Haibei Tibetan Autonomous Prefecture; 2005–2008	Succeeded by Padma Wangdu
Preceded by Che Dalha	Chairman of Tibet; 2021–2024	Succeeded by Garma Cedain
Party political offices
Preceded by Tangod	Party Secretary of Haibei Tibetan Autonomous Prefecture; 2008–2013	Succeeded by Nyima Droma
Preceded by Padma Wangdu	Party Secretary of Lhasa; 2021–2022	Succeeded by Phurbu Dondrup
