= Qiangba Puncog =

Chinese politician

- བྱམས་པ་ཕུན་ཚོགས 向巴平措
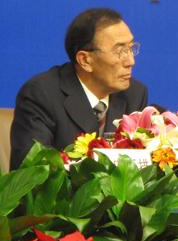
- Qiangba Puncog at the 2010 National People's Congress

Vice Chairman of the Standing Committee of the National People's Congress
- In office 14 March 2013 – 17 March 2018
- Chairman: Zhang Dejiang

Chairman of the Standing Committee of the Tibet Autonomous Region People's Congress
- In office 15 January 2010 – 29 January 2013
- Preceded by: Legqog
- Succeeded by: Padma Choling

Chairman of Tibet
- In office 16 March 2003 – 15 January 2010
- Party Secretary: Guo Jinlong; Yang Chuantang; Zhang Qingli
- Preceded by: Legqog
- Succeeded by: Padma Choling

Personal details
- Born: May 1947 (age 79) Chamdo, Tibet
- Party: Chinese Communist Party
- Education: Chongqing University

Qiangba Puncog, also spelled Champa Phuntsok (Tibetan: བྱམས་པ་ཕུན་ཚོགས་, Wylie: byams pa phun tshogs; Chinese: 向巴平措; pinyin: Xiàngbā Píngcuò; born in May 1947) was the chairman of the government of Tibet Autonomous Region of China from 2003 until January 2010. He is of Tibetan ethnicity. He was most visible in public during the 2008 Tibetan unrest, receiving diplomats and journalists. Qiangba Puncog resigned as chairman on January 12, 2010, and subsequently began serving as chairman of the Standing Committee of the People's Congress of the Tibet Autonomous Region.

== Biography ==
Qiangba Puncog was born in Chamdo, Tibet in May 1947. He graduated from Chongqing University, and he joined in the Chinese Communist Party in 1974.

Assembly seats
Preceded by Legqog	Chairman of the Standing Committee of the Tibet Autonomous Region People's Congress; 2010–2013	Succeeded by Padma Choling
Government offices
Preceded by Legqog	Chairman of Tibet; 2003–2010	Succeeded by Padma Choling
