= Wu Jinghua =

Chinese politician (1931–2007)

- 伍精华

Party Secretary of Tibet
- In office May 1985 – December 1988
- Deputy: Dorje Tseten; Doje Cering (chairman)
- Preceded by: Yin Fatang
- Succeeded by: Hu Jintao

Personal details
- Born: February 17, 1931 Mianning County, Sichuan, China
- Died: 19 October 2007 (aged 76) Beijing, China
- Party: Chinese Communist Party

Chinese name
- Simplified Chinese: 伍精华
- Traditional Chinese: 伍精華
Transcriptions
Standard Mandarin
- Hanyu Pinyin: Wǔ Jīnghuá

Wu Jinghua (Chinese: 伍精华; 17 February 1931 – 19 October 2007) was a Chinese politician of Yi ethnicity who served as Party Secretary of Tibet between 1985 and 1988.

He was a delegate to the 8th, 12th, 13th, and 14th National Congress of the Chinese Communist Party. He was a member of the th and 13th Central Committee of the Chinese Communist Party. He was a delegate to the 7th National People's Congress. He was a member of the Standing Committee of the 8th National People's Congress and 9th National People's Congress.

== Biography ==
=== Sichuan ===
Wu was born in Mianning County, Sichuan, on 17 February 1931. Wu joined the Chinese Communist Party (CCP) in November 1949, and enlisted in the People's Liberation Army (PLA) in 1950. He served as an officer in the publicity department of the CCP Mianning County Committee, a trainee staff officer in the 551st Regiment of the 184th Division of the 62nd Army of the People's Liberation Army (PLA), a staff officer in the Command Headquarters of the 184th Division and the Xichang Military Sub-District, a member of the Puxiong County Work Committee of the CCP, deputy director of the Puxiong County Office, a member of the Puge County Committee of the CCP, deputy county chief, deputy secretary of the County Party Committee, county chief, and chairperson of the County Laborers and People's Association of the CCP, secretary of the Zhaoguet County Party Committee of the CCP, and political committee member of the County Armed Forces.

Starting in 1953, he successively served as a member of the CCP Puxiong County Working Committee, deputy magistrate, magistrate and deputy party secretary of Puge County, member of the CCP Liangshan Yi Autonomous Prefecture Committee, first secretary of the CCP Zhaojue County Committee and political commissar of the People's Armed Forces Department, and secretary and vice governor of the Liangshan Yi Autonomous Prefecture. In 1966, the Cultural Revolution broke out, he was removed from office and effectively sidelined. In 1973, he was a member of the Standing Committee of the CCP Sichuan Provincial Committee and Deputy Chairman of the Standing Committee of the Sichuan Provincial People's Congress (Chinese: 四川省人民代表大会常务委员会).

After the 12th National Congress of the Chinese Communist Party in 1982, he became Executive Deputy Director and Deputy Secretary of the Party Group of the National People's Congress. In February 1983, he served as one of the members of the five-member leading group on the Law on Regional Ethnic Autonomy and was directly involved in organizing the law-drafting. The Law was adopted on May 31, 1984, at the second session of the 6th National People's Congress, and came into force on October 1, 1984.

=== Tibet ===
From May 1985 to December 1988, he served as secretary of the CCP Tibet Autonomous Region Committee, and political commissar of the Tibet Military Region (TMR) as well as first secretary of the Party Committee of the TMR.

=== Beijing ===
From December 1988 to April 1993, he served as deputy director and deputy secretary of the party group of the National People's Congress. From March 1998, at the first session of the 9th National People's Congress, he was elected a member of the Standing Committee of the National People's Congress.

Wu died in Beijing on 19 October 2007, at the age of 76.

Party political offices
Preceded by Yin Fatang	Party Secretary of Tibet; 1985–1988	Succeeded by Hu Jintao
