= Banggaidoi =

- Location within Tibet Autonomous Region
- Coordinates: 32°12′N 97°32′E
- Country: China
- Region: Tibet Autonomous Region
- Prefecture: Qamdo Prefecture
- County: Jomda County

Population
  - Major Nationalities: Tibetan
  - Regional dialect: Tibetan language
- Time zone: +8

Banggaidoi (Chinese: 邦格堆; pinyin: Bānggéduī) is a township in Jomda County, Tibet Autonomous Region of China.
