= Gyaincain Norbu (politician) =

Tibetan politician

- རྒྱལ་མཚན་ནོར་བུ་ 江村罗布

Chairman of Tibet
- In office 1990–1998
- Preceded by: Doje Cering
- Succeeded by: Legqog

Personal details
- Born: June 1932 (age 94) Batang County, Xikang, Republic of China
- Party: Chinese Communist Party
- Education: China University of Political Science and Law

Chinese name
- Simplified Chinese: 江村罗布
- Traditional Chinese: 江村羅布
Transcriptions
Standard Mandarin
- Hanyu Pinyin: Jiāngcūn Luóbù

Tibetan name
- Tibetan: རྒྱལ་མཚན་ནོར་བུ་
Transcriptions
- Wylie: rgyal mtshan nor bu
- Tibetan Pinyin: Gyaincain Norbu

Gyaincain Norbu (Tibetan: རྒྱལ་མཚན་ནོར་བུ་; born June 1932) is a Tibetan politician in the People's Republic of China. He was the chairman of the Tibet Autonomous Region from 1990 to 1998. He was succeeded by Legqog.

== Biography ==
In 1939, he studied at Batang Elementary School, and in 1945 at the Batang Normal School. In June 1950, he joined the People's Liberation Army as a member of the task force of the 18th Army Advance Detachment to Tibet. In 1956, he joined the CCP and became the head of Batang County, deputy secretary of the Zhadong Special Committee of the CPC, secretary of the Shigatse Prefectural Committee, and president of the Higher People's Court of the Tibet Autonomous Region.

From 1978 to 1983, he served as General Procurator of the People's Procuratorate of the Tibet Autonomous Region; from 1983 to 1985, he studied at the China University of Political Science and Law and served as a member of the Standing Committee of the Political and Law Committee of the TAR Party Committee. In 1985, he served as Deputy Secretary of the Tibet Autonomous Regional Committee of the Chinese Communist Party. In 1990, he served as Chairman of the People's Government of Tibet Autonomous Region. On November 29, 1995, he, together with State Councilor and Deputy Secretary of the Central Political and Law Commission Luo Gan, and Ye Xiaowen, the Director of the State Administration for Religious Affairs, jointly presided over the Golden Urn ceremony for the reincarnation of the 10th Panchen Lama at the Jokhang Monastery in Lhasa.

In March 1998, he was elected as a member of the Standing Committee of the National People's Congress (NPC) and Deputy Director of the Nationalities Commission of the National People's Congress at the first meeting of the 9th National People's Congress.

Government offices
Preceded by Doje Cering	Chairman of Tibet; 1990–1998	Succeeded by Legqog
