= Jomda County =

Jomda County 江达县 • འཇོ་མདའ་རྫོང་།
- County
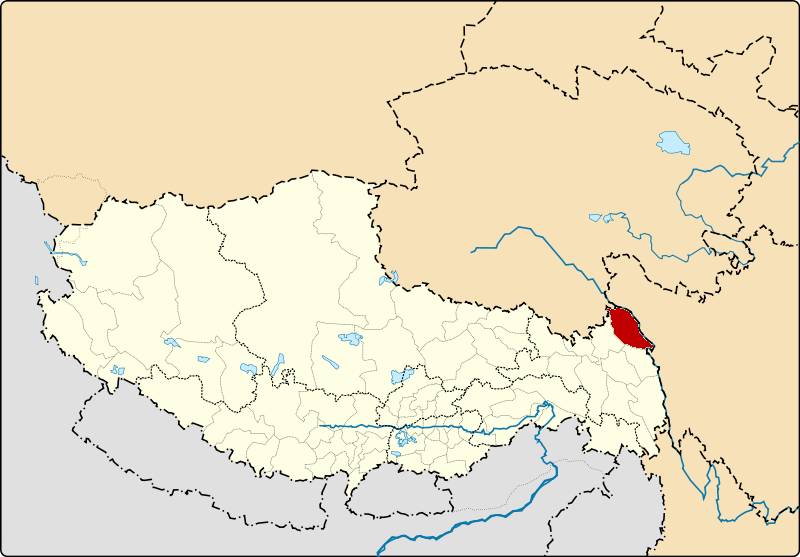
- Location of Jomda County within Tibet

- Location of the seat in the Tibet AR Jomda (China)
- Coordinates: 31.502°N 98.217°E
- Country: China
- Autonomous region: Tibet
- Prefecture-level city: Chamdo
- County seat: Jomda

Area
  - Total: 13,159.34 km^{2} (5,080.85 sq mi)

Population (2020)
  - Total: 92,800
  - Density: 7.05/km^{2} (18.3/sq mi)
- Time zone: UTC+8 (China Standard)
- Website: jiangda.changdu.gov.cn

Jomda County

Chinese name
- Simplified Chinese: 江达县
- Traditional Chinese: 江達縣
Transcriptions
Standard Mandarin
- Hanyu Pinyin: Jiāngdá Xiàn

Tibetan name
- Tibetan: འཇོ་མདའ་རྫོང་།
Transcriptions
- Wylie: ʼjo mdaʼ rdzong
- Tibetan Pinyin: Jomda Zong

Jomda County (Tibetan: འཇོ་མདའ་རྫོང་; Chinese: 江达县) is a county in Chamdo of the Tibet Autonomous Region, China.

== Administrative divisions ==
Jomda is divided in 2 towns and 11 townships.

Name	Chinese	Hanyu Pinyin	Tibetan	Wylie
Town
Jomda Town	江达镇	Jiāngdá zhèn	འཇོ་མདའ་གྲོང་རྡལ།	ʼjo mdaʼ grong rdal
Gamtog Town	岗托镇	Gǎngtuō zhèn	སྐམ་ཐོག་གྲོང་རྡལ།	skam thog grong rdal
Townships
Kargang Township	卡贡乡	Kǎgòng xiāng	མཁར་སྒང་ཤང་།	mkhar sgang shang
Üpäl Township	岩比乡	Yánbǐ xiāng	ཨུད་དཔལ་ཤང་།	ud dpal shang
Qongkor Township	邓柯乡	Dèngkē xiāng	ཆོས་འཁོར་ཤང་།	chos 'khor shang
Sibda Township	生达乡	Shēngdá xiāng	སྲིབ་མདའ་ཤང་།	srib mda' shang
Nyaxi Township	娘西乡	Niángxī xiāng	ཉ་གཤིས་ཤང་།	nya gshis shang
Zigar Township	字呷乡	Zìgā xiāng	རྫི་སྒར་ཤང་།	rdzi sgar shang
Qu'nyido Township	青泥洞乡	Qīngnídòng xiāng	ཆུ་གཉེས་མདོ་ཤང་།	chu gnyes mdo shang
Woinbodoi Township	汪布顶乡	Wāngbùdǐng xiāng	དབོན་པོ་སྟོད་ཤང་།	dbon po stod shang
Dêrdoin Township	德登乡	Dédēng xiāng	གཏེར་སྟོན་ཤང་།	gter ston shang
Tongpu Township	同普乡	Tóngpǔ xiāng	གདོང་ཕུ་ཤང་།	gdong phu shang
Bolo Township	波罗乡	Tóngpǔ xiāng	སྤོ་ལོ་ཤང་།	spo lo shang

== Transport ==
- China National Highway 317

== See also ==
- Banggaidoi
