= Tongpu Township =

Tongpu Township 同普乡
- Township
- Location in Tibet
- Coordinates: 31°35′08″N 98°22′27″E
- Country: China
- Region: Tibet
- Prefecture: Qamdo
- County: Jomda
- Time zone: UTC+8 (China Standard)

Tongpu Township (simplified Chinese: 同普乡; traditional Chinese: 同普鄉; pinyin: Tóngpǔ Xiāng), also referred to as Tangpu, is a township in the northeast of the Tibet Autonomous Region, People's Republic of China. It is located in Jomda County and is situated 22 kilometres (14 mi) northeast of the county seat along China National Highway 317.

== See also ==
- List of towns and villages in Tibet
