= Padma Choling =

Chinese politician (born 1952)

- པདྨ་འཕྲིན་ལས་ 白玛赤林
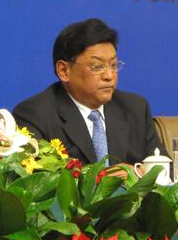
- Padma Choling at the 2010 National People's Congress

Vice Chairman of the Standing Committee of the National People's Congress
- In office 17 March 2018 – 10 March 2023
- Chairman: Li Zhanshu

Chairman of the Standing Committee of the Tibet Autonomous Region People's Congress
- In office 29 January 2013 – 15 January 2017
- Preceded by: Qiangba Puncog
- Succeeded by: Losang Jamcan

Chairman of Tibet
- In office 15 January 2010 – 29 January 2013
- Party Secretary: Zhang Qingli; Chen Quanguo
- Preceded by: Qiangba Puncog
- Succeeded by: Losang Jamcan

Vice Chairman of Tibet
- In office 2003 – 15 January 2010
- Preceded by: Gyamco
- Succeeded by: Losang Jamcan

Personal details
- Born: October 1952 (age 74) Qamdo, Tibet, China
- Party: Chinese Communist Party
- Education: Central Party School
- Occupation: Politician

Chinese name
- Simplified Chinese: 白玛赤林
- Traditional Chinese: 白瑪赤林
Transcriptions
Standard Mandarin
- Hanyu Pinyin: Báimǎ Chìlín

Tibetan name
- Tibetan: པདྨ་འཕྲིན་ལས་
Transcriptions
- Wylie: padma 'phrin-las
- Lhasa IPA: pɛ́mɑ̀ ʈʰĩ́lɪ᷈ː

Padma Choling (Tibetan: པདྨ་འཕྲིན་ལས་, Lhasa dialect: [pɛ́mɑ̀ ʈʰĩ́lɪ᷈ː]; alternatively Pema Thinley, Pelma Chiley, Baima Chilin; Chinese: 白玛赤林; born October 1952) is a Chinese retired politician of Tibetan ethnicity. He was the eighth chairman of the Tibet Autonomous Region (TAR), but in January 2013, was replaced by his deputy Losang Jamcan. Later he served as the Tibet Autonomous Region People's Congress. As Chairman of TAR, Choling was the "most senior ethnic Tibetan in the regional government", though he was subordinate to the TAR Communist Party Chief Zhang Qingli, and later his successor Chen Quanguo.

== Biography ==
Padma Choling was born in 1952 in a farming family in Dêngqên County, Chamdo Prefecture. He joined the People's Liberation Army in Qinghai Province at 17, and served in the army for seventeen years. In the army he played basketball and mastered the Chinese language. He joined the Chinese Communist Party in October 1970. He was an official in the Tibetan regional government since December 1969, working in Xigaze and then Lhasa, rising to the vice-chairmanship of the TAR in 2003. After his anodyne handling of an earthquake in Damxung County outside Lhasa, he was elected the chairman of the Tibet Autonomous Region in 2010.

On 7 December 2020, pursuant to Executive Order 13936 signed by President Donald Trump Choling, being a vice chairperson of the NPC was sanctioned by the US Department of the Treasury. Every other Vice Chairperson of the National People's Congress were sanctioned as well, for "undermining Hong Kong's autonomy and restricting the freedom of expression or assembly."

== Chairmanship ==
Personally, he has been described as "stern, but... amiable" in contrast to his "soft-spoken" predecessor Qiangba Puncog. In addition to stability and ethnic harmony, he has set a goal of 12 percent GDP growth and a ¥4,000 per capita GDP for farmers and herders in the Tibet Autonomous Region. To bring this about, he has signed an agreement with the Ministry of Commerce of the Central Government to allow it to promote trade with South Asia, including Nepal. Padma is of the opinion that there is no "issue of Tibet" that the Dalai Lama says, and questions the Lama's ability to judge the situation in Tibet since he has not been in Tibet since 1959.

On the issue of religion, Padma has said that he and the Karmapa, Ogyen Trinley Dorje are "mates from the same hometown". At the 2010 National People's Congress, he announced that the choosing of the 15th Dalai Lama would abide by the "requirements of Tibetan Buddhist tradition", including approval by the government, instead of being the choice of the 14th Dalai Lama. Already, he has dismissed the Dalai Lama's choice for the 11th Panchen Lama as "invalid".

Moreover, Pema Thinley said at a Press Conference that Gedun Choki Nyima - the child recognized by the Dalai Lama as the reincarnation of the 10th Panchen Lama - is an ordinary person, and that he and his parents wanted to stay away from public attention for their own safety.

On 17 March 2018, Padma was elected as the Vice Chairperson of the Standing Committee of the National People's Congress.

Padma is a member of the 18th Central Committee of the Chinese Communist Party.

In July 2022, he was appointed as the president of the China Society for Human Rights Studies.

Assembly seats
Preceded by Qiangba Puncog	President of Tibet Autonomous Region People's Congress Standing Committee; January 2013 – January 2017	Succeeded by Losang Jamcan
Government offices
Preceded by Qiangba Puncog	Chairman of Tibet; January 2010 – January 2013	Succeeded by Losang Jamcan
Preceded by Gyamco	Executive Vice Chairman of Tibet; 2006–2010	Succeeded by Losang Jamcan
