= Sanggyai Yexe =

Gyalrong Chinese revolutionary and government official (1917–2008)

- སངས་རྒྱས་ཡེ་ཤེས 天宝
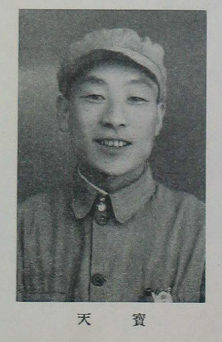

Chairman of Tibet
- In office August 1979 – April 1981
- Preceded by: Ren Rong (of the Tibetan Revolutionary Committee)
- Succeeded by: Ngapoi Ngawang Jigme

Personal details
- Born: 9 February 1917 Barkam, Kham
- Died: 21 February 2008 (aged 91) Chengdu, Sichuan, China
- Party: Chinese Communist Party

Tian Bao

Chinese name
- Traditional Chinese: 天寶
- Simplified Chinese: 天宝
Transcriptions
Standard Mandarin
- Hanyu Pinyin: Tiān Bǎo

Sanggyai Yexe
- Traditional Chinese: 桑吉悅希
- Simplified Chinese: 桑吉悦希
Transcriptions
Standard Mandarin
- Hanyu Pinyin: Sāngjí Yuèxī

Tibetan name
- Tibetan: སངས་རྒྱས་ཡེ་ཤེས
Transcriptions
- Wylie: sangs rgyas ye shes
- Tibetan Pinyin: Sanggyai Yexe

Sanggyai Yexe (Tibetan: སངས་རྒྱས་ཡེ་ཤེས; Chinese: 桑吉悦希) or Tian Bao (Chinese: 天宝; pinyin: Tiān Bǎo; 9 February 1917 – 21 February 2008) was a Chinese government official of Gyalrong descent. Tian was one of the first ethnic Tibetans to embrace communism and join Mao Zedong's army. Mao's army, and the People's Republic of China, later entered Tibet in 1951.

== Biography ==
Tian Bao was born as Sangye Yeshi in Kham, a traditionally eastern region of Tibet which is now part of the Chinese province of Sichuan.

Tian first encountered Mao Zedong's army in 1935 as it pushed through western China when he was eighteen years old. Mao was trying to escape Kuomintang government forces at the time. Tian joined Mao's army and became one of the few ethnic Tibetans who participated in the Long March, a retreat by Chinese Communist forces into northern China in 1935.

Tian later held senior positions in the government and Chinese Communist Party (CCP) of Tibet and Sichuan following the Communist victory in the Chinese Civil War and the 1951 occupation of Tibet. Tian was appointed the deputy secretary of the Tibet Autonomous Regional Committee of the Chinese Communist Party after its establishment in 1965. This was considered to be a high-profile post for an ethnic Tibetan at the time.

Tian Bao died on 21 February 2008, at the age of 92 in the city of Chengdu, Sichuan, PR China. Officials said he died of an unspecified illness, but gave no further details.

He was an alternate member of 8th Central Committee of the Chinese Communist Party, and a full member of 9th to 11th Central Committees; A member of 12th and 13th Central Advisory Commission; a deputy to 1st, 2nd, 3rd and 5th National People's Congress; a standing committee member of 1st CPPCC.
