= Yang Dongsheng =

Tibetan politician (1918–1982)

Yang Dongsheng (杨东生; né Sherab Dondrup ཤེས་རབ་དོན་གྲུབ།) (1918–1982) was a Tibetan politician. He was President of Tibet Autonomous Region People's Congress in 1981–1983. He was succeeded by Ngapoi Ngawang Jigme and was noted for his democratic reforms in Tibet.
