= Losang Jamcan =

Chinese politician of Tibetan ethnicity

- བློ་བཟང་རྒྱལ་མཚན 洛桑江村
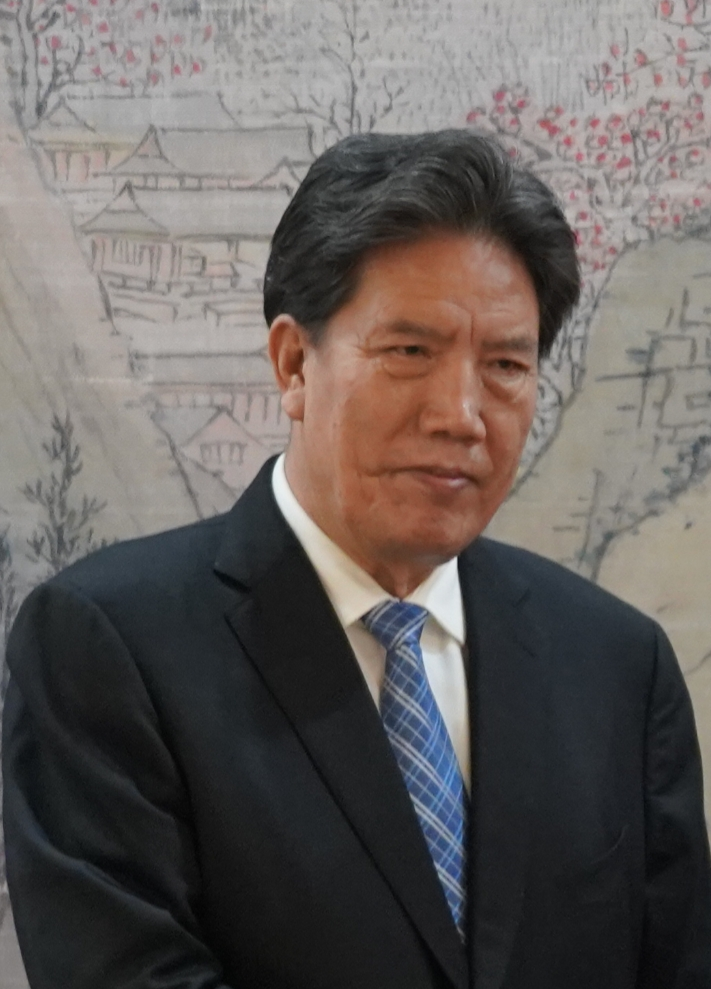
- Losang Jamcan in April 2025

Vice Chairman of the Standing Committee of the National People's Congress
- Incumbent
- Assumed office 10 March 2023
- Chairman: Zhao Leji

Chairman of the Standing Committee of the Tibet Autonomous Region People's Congress
- In office 15 January 2017 – 22 January 2025
- Preceded by: Padma Choling
- Succeeded by: Yan Jinhai

Chairman of Tibet
- In office 29 January 2013 – 15 January 2017
- Preceded by: Padma Choling
- Succeeded by: Che Dalha

Mayor of Lhasa
- In office September 1995 – January 2003
- Preceded by: Losang Dhondup
- Succeeded by: Norbu Dondrub

Personal details
- Born: July 1957 (age 69) Zhag'yab County, Tibet
- Party: Chinese Communist Party
- Education: Tibet University for Nationalities; Central Party School of the Chinese Communist Party

Losang Jamcan

Chinese name
- Chinese: 洛桑江村
Transcriptions
Standard Mandarin
- Hanyu Pinyin: Luòsāng Jiāngcūn

Tibetan name
- Tibetan: བློ་བཟང་རྒྱལ་མཚན
Transcriptions
- Wylie: blo-bzang rgyal-mtshan
- Lhasa IPA: lósɑ̀ŋ cɛ̀ːt͡sɛ̃́

Losang Jamcan, also spelled Losang Gyaltsen (Tibetan: བློ་བཟང་རྒྱལ་མཚན, Lhasa dialect: [lósɑ̀ŋ cɛ̀ːt͡sɛ̃́]; Chinese: 洛桑江村; born July 1957), is a Chinese politician of Tibetan ethnicity who is currently a vice chairman of the Standing Committee of the National People's Congress and the chairman of the Standing Committee of the People's Congress of the Tibet Autonomous Region.

Losang Jamcan previously served as the mayor of Lhasa, and later as the chairman of Tibet.

== Early life ==
Losang Jamcan was born in Zhag'yab County, Chamdo Prefecture in eastern Tibet. From December 1971 to February 1976 he attended Tibet University for Nationalities in Xianyang, Shaanxi province, studying Literature. After graduating he worked at the university for 10 years as an instructor and an official of the school Communist Youth League.

== Career ==
In December 1986 Losang Jamcan returned to his native Tibet, where he was the Secretary of the Communist Youth League of the autonomous region. From 1992 to 1995 he served as the Deputy Communist Party Chief and Commissioner of Nagqu Prefecture in northern Tibet. In June 1995 he was transferred to the Tibetan capital Lhasa to be its Deputy Party Chief. He was appointed acting mayor in September 1995, and became Mayor of Lhasa in May 1996. From 2001 to 2004 he was enrolled in the part-time postgraduate program of the Central Party School of the Chinese Communist Party, studying Marxist philosophy.

In January 2003 Losang Jamcan was promoted to Vice Chairman of Tibet Autonomous Region, and Executive Vice Chairman in May 2010. On 29 January 2013 he was elected Chairman of Tibet by the Tibet Autonomous Regional People's Congress, succeeding Padma Choling, who became chairman of the standing committee of the congress. As the regional chairman he is subordinate to Chen Quanguo, the Communist Party Chief and top official of Tibet. On 15 January 2017, he was elected as the President of Tibet Autonomous Region People's Congress Standing Committee.

On March 10, 2023, during the 14th National People's Congress, he was appointed Vice Chairman of the Standing Committee of the National People's Congress.

Losang Jamcan has been a member of the 18th and 19th Central Committees of the Chinese Communist Party.

Assembly seats
| Preceded by Padma Choling | Chairman of the People's Congress of the Tibet Autonomous Region; 2017– | Incumbent |
Government offices
| Preceded by Padma Choling | Chairman of Tibet; 2013–2017 | Succeeded by Che Dalha |
