= Che Dalha =

Chinese politician (born 1958)

- ཆེ་དགྲ་ལྷ 齐扎拉

Chairman of Tibet
- In office 15 January 2017 – 8 October 2021
- Preceded by: Losang Jamcan
- Succeeded by: Yan Jinhai

Personal details
- Born: August 1958 (age 68) Zhongdian County, Yunnan, China
- Party: Chinese Communist Party (1982–2025; expelled)
- Education: Yunnan Nationalities University; Central Party School

Chinese name
- Simplified Chinese: 齐扎拉
- Traditional Chinese: 齊扎拉
Transcriptions
Standard Mandarin
- Hanyu Pinyin: Qízhālā

Tibetan name
- Tibetan: ཆེ་དགྲ་ལྷ
Transcriptions
- Wylie: che dgra-lha
- THL: Ché Dralha
- Tibetan Pinyin: Qê Zhalha
- Lhasa IPA: t͡ɕʰé ʈàl̥a

Che Dalha (Tibetan: ཆེ་དགྲ་ལྷ, Lhasa dialect: [t͡ɕʰé ʈàl̥a]; born August 1958), also romanized as Che Zala and Qizhala (Chinese: 齐扎拉; pinyin: Qízhālā), is a Chinese politician of Tibetan ethnicity who served as Chairman (Governor) of the Tibet Autonomous Region between January 2017 and October 2021. Originally from Yunnan province, he served as Party Secretary of the Tibetan capital Lhasa between 2012 and 2017. Since October 2017, he is the member of the Central Committee of the Chinese Communist Party.

== Career ==
Che Dalha was born in Zhongdian County, Yunnan (later renamed Shangri-La). He left school at age 10 to herd animals in his home village. He completed primary school and high school by teaching himself. In 1979, he participated in the civil service examinations of Zhongdian County with good results, and was given a minor post in the Communist Youth League as a rural functionary. In 1983, the 25-year-old Che Dalha became the Communist Youth League Secretary of Zhongdian County. He would progressively ascend the ranks of the Communist Party hierarchy, serving as the Deputy Party Secretary, then Party Secretary of Zhongdian County.

Between 1994 and 2001, Che Dalha was instrumental in bringing the "Shangri-la" brand to life in Zhongdian County, making the area a major tourist destination. In 2001, the year he was promoted to Governor of the Dêqên Tibetan Autonomous Prefecture, Zhongdian County was officially renamed Shangri-La by directive of the State Council. In 1996 he attended to Yunnan Nationalities University, and graduated in 1998 with a degree in economic management specializing in ethnic minority affairs; he also has a bachelor's degree from the Central Party School in political and legal affairs. In Dêqên, Che Dalha was credited with making the region the "best Tibetan region in China" as documented by Chinese official sources. He was elected a provincial party standing committee member in Yunnan province in 2010, ascending to sub-provincial ranks.

In September 2010, Che Dalha was appointed as the Head of the United Front Work Department in Tibet Autonomous Region, and he was elected as the Vice Chairman of the Tibet People's Political Consultative Conference in 2011. In 2012, he was appointed as the Party Secretary of Tibetan capital Lhasa; the move was welcomed by some Lhasa residents because Che Dalha had replaced a Han Chinese, Qin Yizhi, in the post. In his capacity as party chief of Lhasa, he visited Chicago and met with U.S. Senator Mark Kirk. His tenure in Lhasa was largely defined by the modernization of the cityscape.

On 15 January 2017, Che Dalha was appointed Chairman of Tibet Autonomous Region, succeeding Losang Jamcan. He was the ninth ethnic Tibetan to assume the post after the conclusion of the Cultural Revolution, and the first chairman from Yunnan province. He was additionally the first chairman of the region to have not been born in the Tibet Autonomous Region in some twenty years.

On 23 October 2021, he was appointed vice chairperson of the National People's Congress Ethnic Affairs Committee.

In March 2023, Che Dalha took the position of deputy head of the Committee on Agriculture and Rural Affairs of the National Committee of the Chinese People's Political Consultative Conference.

== Investigation ==
On 23 January 2025, Che Dalha was put under investigation for alleged "serious violations of discipline and laws" by the Central Commission for Discipline Inspection (CCDI), the party's internal disciplinary body, and the National Supervisory Commission, the highest anti-corruption agency of China. On July 22, he was expelled from the CCP and dismissed from public office.

On 5 June 2026, Che Dalha was sentenced to life imprisonment in Chongqing court for taking bribery in 158 million yuan.

Government offices
Preceded by Kang Zhongming	Governor of Dêqên Tibetan Autonomous Prefecture; 2001–2007	Succeeded by Chen Jianguo
Preceded by Losang Jamcan	Chairman of Tibet; 2017–2021	Succeeded by Yan Jinhai
Party political offices
Preceded by Mao Wenguo	Party Secretary of Dêqên Tibetan Autonomous Prefecture; 2007–2010	Succeeded by Zhang Dengliang
Preceded by Losang Jamcan	Head of the United Front Department of the Tibet Autonomous Region Committee of the Chinese Communist Party; 2010–2011	Succeeded by Gönbo Zhaxi
Preceded by Qin Yizhi	Party Secretary of Lhasa; 2011–2017	Succeeded by Padma Wamdi
