= Tibet Autonomous Regional Committee of the Chinese People's Political Consultative Conference =

Tibet Autonomous Regional Committee of the Chinese People's Political Consultative Conference 中国人民政治协商会议西藏自治区委员会 ཀྲུང་གོ་མི་དམངས་ཆབ་སྲིད་གྲོས་མོལ་ཚོགས་འདུ་བོད་རང་སྐྱོང་ལྗོངས་ཨུ་ཡོན་ལྷན་ཁང
- 12th Tibet Autonomous Regional Committee of the Chinese People's Political Consultative Conference

Type
- Type: Regional committee of the Chinese People's Political Consultative Conference
- Established: December 20, 1959

Leadership
- Chairman: Pagbalha Geleg Namgyai
- Vice Chairpersons: See list: Garma Cedain; Meng Xiaolin; Drukhang Thubten Khedrup; Tsemonling Tenzin Trinley; Dzonglo Jampa Khedrup; Salung Phuntra; Dorjee Tsedrup; Ngawang; Pema Wangdu; Drolkar; Tashi Dawa; Yu Yungui; Wang Gang
- Secretary-General: Wang Gang

Website
- www.xizangzx.gov.cn

Tibet Autonomous Regional Committee of the Chinese People's Political Consultative Conference

Chinese name
- Simplified Chinese: 中国人民政治协商会议西藏自治区委员会
Transcriptions
Standard Mandarin
- Hanyu Pinyin: Zhōngguó Rénmín Zhèngzhì Xiéshāng Huìyì Xīzàng Zìzhìqū Wěiyuánhuì

Alternative Chinese name
- Simplified Chinese: 政协西藏自治区委员会
Transcriptions
Standard Mandarin
- Hanyu Pinyin: Zhèngxié Xīzàng Zìzhìqū Wěiyuánhuì

Second alternative Chinese name
- Chinese: 西藏自治区政协
Transcriptions
Standard Mandarin
- Hanyu Pinyin: Xīzàng Zìzhìqū Zhèngxié

Tibetan name
- Tibetan: ཀྲུང་གོ་མི་དམངས་ཆབ་སྲིད་གྲོས་མོལ་ཚོགས་འདུ་བོད་རང་སྐྱོང་ལྗོངས་ཨུ་ཡོན་ལྷན་ཁང

The Tibet Autonomous Region Committee of the Chinese People's Political Consultative Conference is the branch of the Chinese People's Political Consultative Conference in the Tibet Autonomous Region.

== History ==
On December 20, 1959, the office of the Tibet Autonomous Region Committee of the Chinese People's Political Consultative Conference was established. During the Cultural Revolution, the committee was paralyzed. In April 1978, the Office of the Chinese People's Political Consultative Conference Tibet Autonomous Region Committee was re-established.

== See also ==
- Standing Committee of the Tibet Autonomous Region People's Congress
