= 2008 Lhasa riots =

Riot during the 2008 Tibetan unrest

The 2008 Lhasa riots, also referred to as the March 14 riots or March 14 incident (Chinese: 三·一四事件) in Chinese media, was one of a number of violent protests that took place during the 2008 Tibetan unrest.

== Riots ==
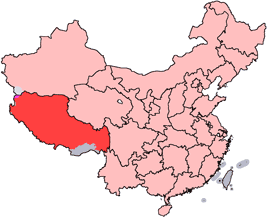
Tibet Autonomous Region

Tibetan rioters appeared to be targeting shops and vehicles owned by Han Chinese, the predominant ethnic group in China, and Hui, who are a Muslim minority. According to the BBC and The Wall Street Journal, rioters focused on setting fire to and looting businesses owned by them; The Wall Street Journal stated that first-hand accounts of their stories have been relatively rare in Western news reports, in part because it is difficult to reach people by phone in Lhasa." Tibetans face similar problems due to the strict controls on media reporting of events in Tibetan areas of China. James Miles, in an interview with CNN, made the following assessment, "What I saw was calculated targeted violence against an ethnic group, or I should say two ethnic groups, primarily ethnic Han Chinese living in Lhasa, but also members of the Muslim Hui minority in Lhasa."

A crowd tried to storm the Lhasa Great Mosque and set fire to the front gate. Shops and restaurants in the Muslim quarter were destroyed.

Also according to The Economist, "The mobs, ranging from small groups of youths (some armed with traditional Tibetan swords) to crowds of many dozens, including women and children, rampaged through the narrow alleys of the Tibetan quarter. They battered the shutters of shops, broke in and seized whatever they could, from hunks of meat to gas canisters and clothing. Some goods they carried away, while other goods were thrown into large fires lit on the street." Little children could also be seen looting a toy shop as well and mobs were attempting to ram the defenses of banks. The mobs also attacked any ethnic Chinese on the streets. James Miles reported seeing a Han Chinese teenage boy plead to a monk to help him hide because of the violence around the city.

The Guardian reported that according to a foreign eyewitness account, rioters attacked Han, Muslim Hui and other ethnic minorities. Foreigners were not attacked. With the exception of Tibetan-owned hotels, many other hotels were vandalized and smashed. The foreign eyewitness also reported seeing three rioters repeatedly stabbing an unconscious man. After the Monday deadline, Chinese police announced on loudspeakers that anyone who took part in the violence and gave themselves up would be treated with leniency.

According to the London-based Free Tibet Campaign, an eyewitness in Lhasa saw rioters set a mosque on fire late on Friday night and throw stones at people who appeared to be Hui.

Other Western tourists emerged from Tibet with graphic descriptions of the level of violence that had occurred. Some claimed that they had seen non-Tibetan Chinese, including the elderly, being beaten and stoned to death by groups of Tibetans, supported by the crowd.

== Other events ==
An eyewitness stated that police cars, fire engines and other official vehicles were set on fire after anger erupted following the police's dispersal of a peaceful demonstration near a small temple in Lhasa. According to CNN, Police used gunfire and tear gas to break up the protest. "The monks are still protesting. Police and army cars were burned. There are people crying," she said. Tensions in Lhasa increased as the city's three biggest monasteries were sealed off by thousands of soldiers and armed police amid the largest protests in nearly two decades. Chinese authorities reportedly fired warning shots and used tear gas and electric prods to disperse hundreds of protesters, in addition to detaining up to 50 monks. US embassy officials in Beijing told the Associated Press that U.S. citizens had reportedly seen gunfire and rioting in Lhasa. Tibetan exiles quoted in the Times of London report that at least five people had been killed in police firing by March 15.

According to a Tibetan who fled Tibet after the demonstrations in Lhasa, knife-wielding Chinese troops attacked Tibetan demonstrators on March 14, and several demonstrators died from gunshot and knife wounds.

== Aftermath ==
In the aftermath of the riot, residents appeared to have mixed reactions to the violence. Some Tibetans celebrated by throwing toilet paper that resembled traditional Tibetan scarves over wires across the streets. However, "others appeared aghast at the violence."

== Casualties ==
The official Chinese media source Xinhua has reported that on March 14 in Lhasa "rioters injured 623 people including 241 police and armed police and killed 18 others. They also set fire to more than 300 locations, mostly private houses, stores and schools, smashed vehicles and damaged public facilities."

The official Chinese media has now published details including names and photographs of some of those they say were killed or injured during the rioting. According to Xinhua, local police have "confirmed" the identities of 14 out of the 18 "innocent civilians" killed in the riots, including one "eight-month-old infant" and one "ethnic Tibetan woman" in a fire, set by "arson".

Radio Free Asia and the International Campaign for Tibet reported that fresh protests broke out at the Ramoche Temple, situated in the northwest of Lhasa, March 29, 2008, as a 15-member group of diplomats from the United States, Japan and Europe returned to Beijing after a two-day visit to the Tibetan capital. However, independent verification of the protest could not be obtained.
