= Zeng Yongya =

Chinese Communist general

Zeng Yongya (July 1917 - March 16, 1995, Chinese: 曾雍雅), a native of Yudu County, Jiangxi Province, served as a general in the People's Liberation Army.

== Biography ==
Zeng Yongya joined the local guerrillas in 1930 and joined the Chinese Workers' and Peasants' Red Army in 1931. In 1932, he became a member of the Communist Youth League of China before transitioning to the Chinese Communist Party in the same year. In the first Nationalist-Communist Civil War, Zeng Yongya held the positions of sub-captain of the publicity team within the political department of the 7th Division of the 3rd Red Army, instructor at the Defense Bureau of the 1st Red Army Corps, and company commander of the 5th Regiment of the 2nd Division. He participated in the Long March. During the Second Sino-Japanese War, he held several positions, including head of the enemy work unit of the Independent Regiment of the 115th Division of the Eighth Route Army, head of the enemy work section of the 1st Military Sub-District of the Jinchah-Hebei Military Region, mayor of Guangling County, commander of the 3rd Detachment of the 1st Military Sub-District of the Jinchah-Hebei Military Region, political commissioner of the 34th Regiment, and vice commander and commander of the 14th Military Sub-District of the Jidong Military Region in 1944. During the Second Nationalist-Communist Civil War, he held the positions of commander of the 14th Military Sub-District of the Jidong Military Region, commander of the 11th Brigade, and both commander and political commissar of the 12th Independent Brigade. From August 1947 to November 1948, he held the position of commander of the 25th Division within the 9th Column of the North-East Democratic Allied Army (Chinese: 东北民主联军). From November 1948 to November 1950, he held the position of commander of the 136th Division of the 46th Army within the Fourth Field Army, directing the forces in the Liaoshen campaign, Pingjin campaign, Battle of Hengbao, and the Battle of Guangxi.

Zeng Yongya assumed the role of deputy commander of the 12th Corps following the establishment of the People's Republic of China. Following the commencement of the Korean War, Zeng Yongya held the positions of Deputy Commander of the 46th Army of the People's Volunteer Army from September 1952 to June 1953, Deputy Commander of the 50th Army from June 1953 to April 1954, and First Deputy Commander and Secretary of the Party Committee of the 50th Army from April 1954 to April 1955. Upon his return to China in April 1955, he assumed the role of acting commander of the 50th Army. He received the rank of major general in 1955. He completed his studies at the Basic Department of the Higher Military College of the People's Liberation Army in May 1960. Then, he held the position of commander of the 40th Army from May 1960 until July 1963. He held the position of Vice Chief of Staff of the Shenyang Military Region from August 1963 until November 1963 and served as the deputy chief of staff of the Shenyang Military Region.

From November 1963 to September 1968, Zeng Yongya held the positions of deputy commander and deputy secretary of the Party Committee of the Tibet Military District, overseeing the region's daily operations during Zhang Guohua's illness. From January 1965 to August 1965, he was a member of the Standing Committee of the CCP Tibet Work Committee, and from September 1965 to December 1967, he served as a member of the Standing Committee of the Tibet Autonomous Regional Committee of the Chinese Communist Party. On August 28, 1968, he was designated as the commander of the Party Committee of the Tibet Military Region, the first secretary of the Party Committee, and the director of the Tibet Revolutionary Committee. The 9th National Congress of the Chinese Communist Party elected him as an alternate member of the Central Committee in April 1969, and reappointed him as an adviser to the Shenyang Military Region in August 1975.

Zeng Yongya died in Shenyang on March 16, 1995.
