= Ren Rong =

Chinese general and politician

- 任荣

Personal details
- Born: September 1917 Cangxi County, Sichuan, Republic of China
- Died: June 16, 2017 (aged 99)
- Party: Chinese Communist Party

Ren Rong (Chinese: 任荣; Wade–Giles: Jen Jung; 10 September 1917 – 16 June 2017), formerly known as Ren Wuyun (Chinese: 任武云), was a Chinese general and politician.

== Biography ==
=== Republic of China ===
Born in Sichuan in 1917, Ren Rong joined the Communist Youth League of China in 1933 and was transferred to the Chinese Communist Party in 1934. During the Second Sino-Japanese War, he successively served as the head of the publicity unit of the political office of the Third Regiment of the Police Reserve of the Eighth Route Army Retention Corps, a political instructor of the battalion, and the deputy head and head of the organization section of the First Brigade of the Police Reserve. Ren Rong was one of the first instructors of the Counter-Japanese Military and Political University. In the summer of 1945, the First Brigade of the Police Reserve, to which Ren Rong belonged, was reorganized into the Third Detachment of the Eighth Route Army Guerrillas, and traveled southward from Yan'an to Hunan-Guangdong to create the Wuling Base Area, and soon advanced to the areas of Mianchi, Luoning, and Xin'an in Henan Province.

During the Second Kuomintang-Communist Civil War, he successively served as political commissar of the 16th Independent Brigade Regiment of the Ji-Re-Liao Military Region, and then participated in the Liao-Shen Battle in 1948. Ren Rong's brigade was reorganized into the 23rd division of the 8th column of the Northeast Democratic Allied Army (Chinese: 东北民主联军), and he was still the political commissar of the 68th regiment of the reorganized division. During the Autumn Offensive of 1947 in Northeast China, the regiment took part in a number of battles. In the battle of Jiuguan Taimen, they directly attacked the enemy division headquarters and captured more than 1,000 people including the Kuomintang's 21st Division Major General Division Commander and Major General Chief of Staff. After the battle, Ren Rong was promoted to be the deputy political commissar of the 23rd Division and director of the political department.

In October 1948, during the decisive phase of the Liao-Shen Campaign, the Kuomintang Army had two divisions that managed to open a route from Shenyang to Yingkou, intending to retreat to Huludao by sea using warships. On the morning of October 24, Ren Rong led the 68th Regiment and the Division's Artillery Battalion as part of the division]s third echelon, advancing toward the Huangjiawupeng area near the ferry. Upon encountering the enemy, they successfully blocked the Kuomintang Army's withdrawal.

=== People's Republic of China ===
After the founding of the People's Republic of China, Ren Rong took part in the Korean War in 1950, served as the head of the Organization Department and deputy director of the Political Department of the Chinese People's Volunteer Army, and was appointed as a member of the Chinese side of the Korean Military Armistice Commission (KMACOM) in 1954, and was awarded the rank of major general in 1955. He then served as deputy political commissar of the Chengdu Military Region and political commissar of the Tibet Military Region and deputy political commissar of the Wuhan Military Region. From 1971 to 1980, he was the Communist Party Chief of the Tibet Autonomous Region, and Chairman of the Autonomous Region's Chinese People's Political Consultative Conference. He was a delegate to the 9th National Congress of the Chinese Communist Party, an alternate member of the 10th CCP Central Committee, a member of the 11th Central Committee, an alternate member of the 12th Central Committee, a deputy to the 4th and 5th National People's Congress, and a member of the Standing Committee of the Seventh National Committee of the Chinese People's Political Consultative Conference.

In 1980, he was appointed Deputy Political Commissar of Wuhan Military Region, and in 1988, he was awarded the First Class Red Star Medal of Honor. On June 16, 2017, Ren Rong died in Wuhan at the age of 100.
