= Pagbalha Geleg Namgyai =

Tibetan politician of the PRC

- འཕགས་པ་ལྷ་དགེ་ལེགས་རྣམ་རྒྱལ་
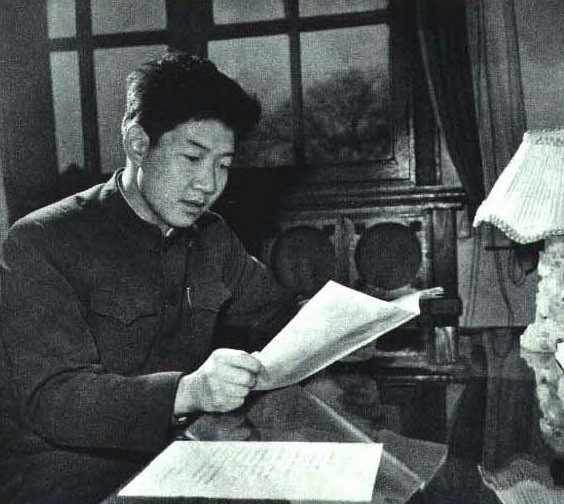
- Pagbalha Geleg Namgyai in 1965

11th Pagbalha Hutuktu
- Incumbent
- Assumed office 1942
- Preceded by: Lobzang Tubten Mipam Tsultrim Gyeltsen

Vice Chairman of the Chinese People's Political Consultative Conference
- Incumbent
- Assumed office 13 March 2003
- Chairman: Jia Qinglin; Yu Zhengsheng; Wang Yang; Wang Huning
- In office 29 April 1959 – 27 March 1993
- Chairman: Zhou Enlai; Deng Xiaoping; Deng Yingchao; Li Xiannian

Vice Chairman of the Standing Committee of the National People's Congress
- In office 27 March 1993 – 15 March 2003
- Chairman: Qiao Shi; Li Peng

Chairman of the Tibet Autonomous Regional Committee of the Chinese People's Political Consultative Conference
- Incumbent
- Assumed office January 1993
- Preceded by: Raidi

Personal details
- Born: February 1940 (age 86) Litang County, Xikang, Republic of China
- Party: Independent

Chinese name
- Simplified Chinese: 帕巴拉·格列朗杰
- Traditional Chinese: 帕巴拉·格列朗傑
Transcriptions
Standard Mandarin
- Hanyu Pinyin: Pàbālā Géliè Lǎngjié

Tibetan name
- Tibetan: འཕགས་པ་ལྷ་དགེ་ལེགས་རྣམ་རྒྱལ་
Transcriptions
- Wylie: vphags pa lha dge legs rnam rgyal
- Tibetan Pinyin: Pagbalha Gêlêg Namgyä

Pagbalha Geleg Namgyai (Tibetan: འཕགས་པ་ལྷ་དགེ་ལེགས་རྣམ་རྒྱལ་; Chinese: 帕巴拉·格列朗杰; born February 1940) is the 11th Qamdo Pagbalha Hutuktu of Tibetan Buddhism and a politician of the People's Republic of China. He is a Vice Chairman of the Chinese People's Political Consultative Conference (CPPCC), and the Honorary President of the Buddhist Association of China. He also formerly served as a Vice Chairman of the National People's Congress, Vice Chairman of the Tibet Autonomous Region, and Vice President of the Buddhist Association of China. As a Tibetan tulku (incarnate lama), he is notable for his willingness to work in the Chinese government, except during the Cultural Revolution.

== Biography ==
Pagbalha Geleg Namgyai was born in February 1940 in Litang County, in present-day Garzê Tibetan Autonomous Prefecture of Sichuan Province. In 1942, he was recognized as the 11th incarnation of Pagbalha Hutuktu. He is a member of the Qangdin Monastery in Qamdo, Tibet.

Following the Battle of Qamdo in 1950, Pagbalha Geleg Namgyai was appointed Vice Chairman of the Qamdo Liberation Committee at the age of 10. From 1952 to 1956 he studied Buddhist sutras at the Sera Monastery in Lhasa. In 1956 he became a member of the Tibet Autonomous Region Preparatory Committee, and appointed its Vice Chairman in 1960. He also served as Chairman of the Religious Affairs Committee from 1956 to 1965, and visited Beijing several times, together with the 10th Panchen Lama. In 1959, he became a Vice Chairman of the Chinese People's Political Consultative Conference (3rd CPPCC National Committee).

As a Tibetan tulku, he is notable for his willingness to work in the Chinese government since boyhood, except during the Cultural Revolution (1966–1976), when he was sent to perform manual labour.

After the end of the Cultural Revolution, he resumed his position as Vice Chairman of the CPPCC, and was most recently re-elected in 2013 to the position in the 12th CPPCC National Committee. From 1993 to 2002, he served as Vice Chairman of the CPPCC Tibet Autonomous Region (TAR) Committee, Vice Chairman of the TAR People's Congress Standing Committee, Vice Chairman of the TAR People's Government, and Vice President of the Buddhist Association of China. From 1993 to 2003 he also concurrently held the post of Vice Chairman of the National People's Congress. Since 2002 he has been the Honorary President of the Buddhist Association of China.

== Family ==
Pagbalha Geleg Namgyai had an elder brother named Kamqoin Soinam Gyamco. According to Chinese sources, he was killed by the rebels during the March 1959 Tibetan uprising, in front of Lhasa's Norbulingka.

Religious titles
| Preceded by Lobzang Tubten Mipam Tsultrim Gyeltsen | Pagbalha Hutuktu; 1942–present | Incumbent |
Assembly seats
| Preceded by Raidi | Chairman of the Tibet Autonomous Regional Committee of the Chinese People's Political Consultative Conference; 1993–present | Incumbent |
Government offices
| Preceded by K. H. Ting | President of China Committee of Religion and Peace; 2009–present | Incumbent |
