= Standing Committee of the Tibet Autonomous Region People's Congress =

The Standing Committee of the Tibet Autonomous Region People's Congress (Chinese: 西藏自治区人民代表大会常务委员会, Tibetan: བོད་རང་སྐྱོང་ལྗོངས་མི་དམངས་འཐུས་མི་ཚོགས་ཆེན་རྒྱུན་ལས་ཨུ་ཡོན་ལྷན་ཁང) is a permanent organ of the Tibet Autonomous Region People's Congress, responsible to and reporting to the Tibet Autonomous Region People's Congress. Its main functions are legislation, supervision, personnel appointment and removal, decision-making on major issues, theoretical research on people's congresses, etc.

== History ==
On September 1, 1965, the first session of the first People's Congress of the Tibet Autonomous Region was held, and the Tibet Autonomous Region was formally established. According to the Constitution and Local Organization Law at that time, there was no permanent organ of the People's Congress of the first-level administrative region. In July 1979, the Second Session of the Fifth National People's Congress adopted the "Resolution on Amending Certain Provisions of the Constitution of the People's Republic of China". On August 14, 1979, the Second Session of the Third People's Congress of the Tibet Autonomous Region elected the Standing Committee of the Autonomous Region People's Congress, which was the first provincial-level administrative region standing committee established by the People's Republic of China.

== See also ==
- Tibet Autonomous Regional Committee of the Chinese People's Political Consultative Conference
