= Four Rugby Boys =

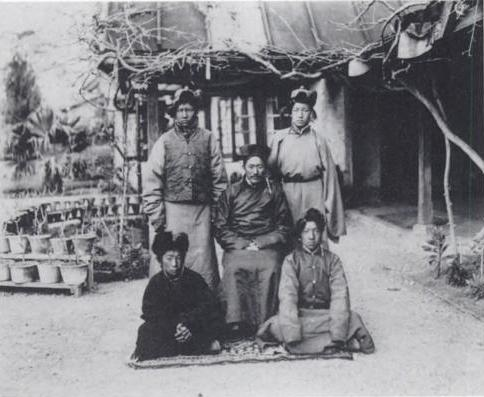
Lungshar and the four Tibetan students just before leaving for England.

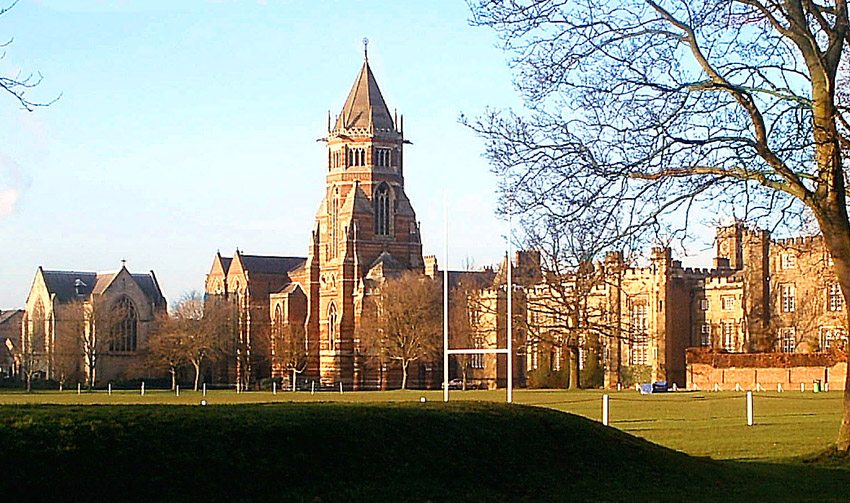
Rugby School as seen from "the close" where according to legend Rugby football was invented

The 1910s saw an attempt to turn four young Tibetans – the Four Rugby Boys – into the vanguard of "modernisers" through the medium of an English public school education.

Lungshar, a Tibetan high official, escorted four sons of Tibetan "respectable families" – W. N. Kyipup, K. K. Möndö, Sonam Gonpa Gongkar and R. D. Ringang – to England, in 1913, so they could be educated at a public school. After completing their studies at Rugby School, each of the Rugby Four received professional training in a particular field and eventually returned to Tibet.

According to Lungshar's son Lhalu Tsewang Dorje, "the experiment was not a great success." Historian Alastair Lamb concurs: “the experiment […] can hardly be described as a success", adding that the boys were side-tracked by the Tibetan establishment and "made no significant contribution in later life to the development of Tibet".

== The experiment ==
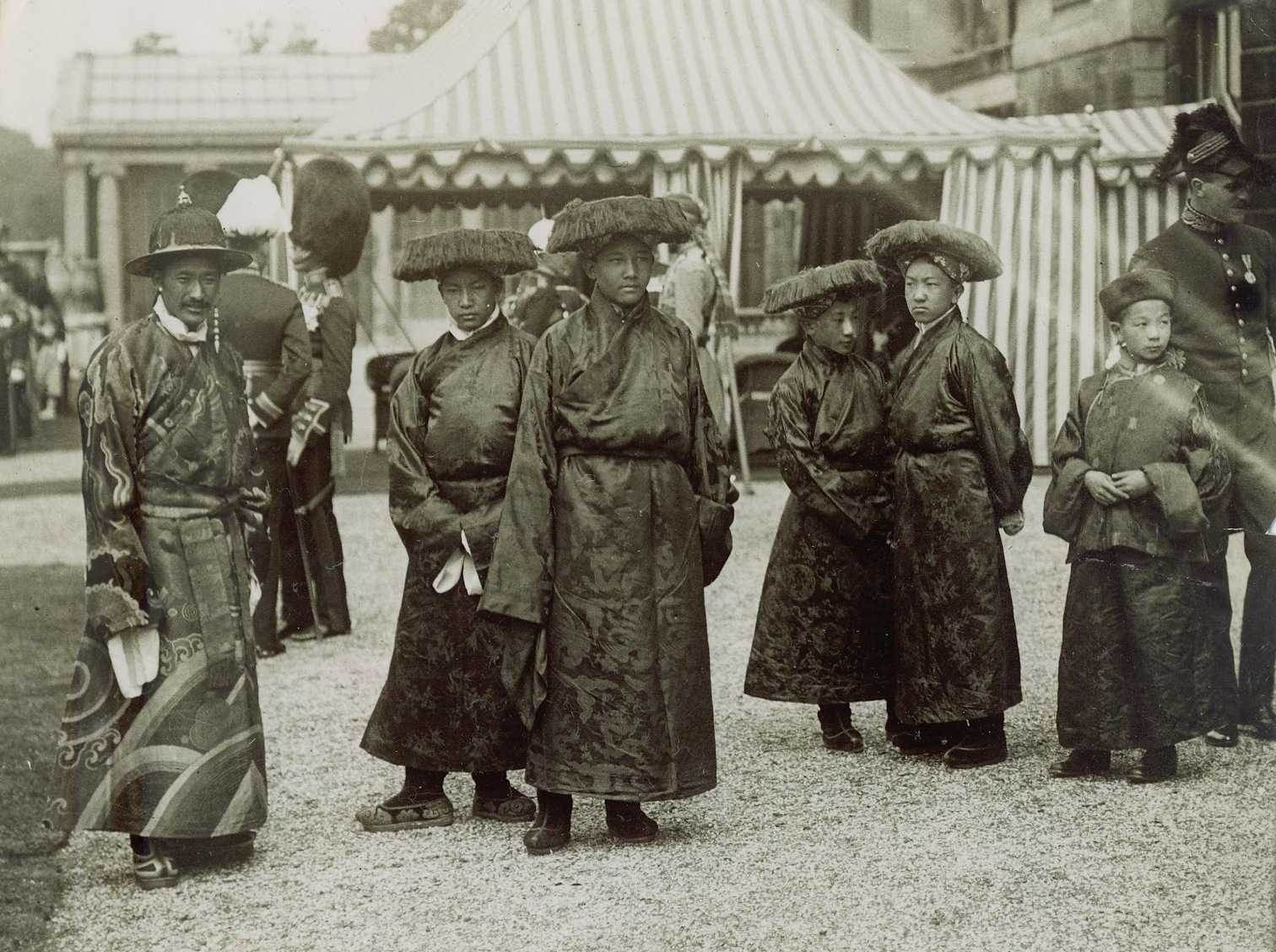
Lungshar, Möndro, Ringang, Kyipup and Gongkar at Buckingham Palace, 28 June 1913 after an audience with King George V

In August 1912, the Dalai Lama proposed that some "energetic and clever sons of respectable families" in Tibet should be given "first-class educations at Oxford College, London". The Indian government requested that Basil Gould, who was about to go on leave back to England, should guide the four young Tibetan boys (known as the "Rugby Boys") on their journey to the United Kingdom and assist them through the difficult first few weeks of their journey away from the roof of the world. In early 1913 the youths selected turned up at the British Trade Agency at Gyantse, where their companion, a Tibetan official called Lungshar, presented Gould with a request from the Dalai Lama for four first-class educations at Oxford College, London. The four boys were W. N. Kyipup (16), K. K. Möndö, a monk, (17), Gongkar (16) and R. D. Ringang (11).

The Tibetan Boys settled down at Farnham, where they began to learn English under the supervision of the Berlitz School of Languages. It was decided that Rugby would be the best place for their schooling.

=== Wangdu Norbu Kyipup ===
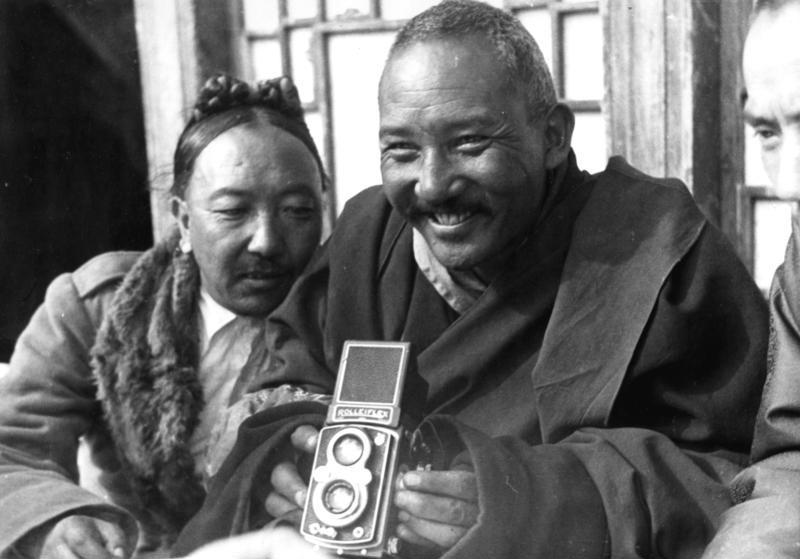
Kyipup (left) and Möndö in 1939

Kyipup studied telegraphy, surveying and cartography. On returning to Tibet, he was assigned the task of developing a telegraph network but failed and was given other assignments.

=== Khyenrab Kunzang Mondo ===
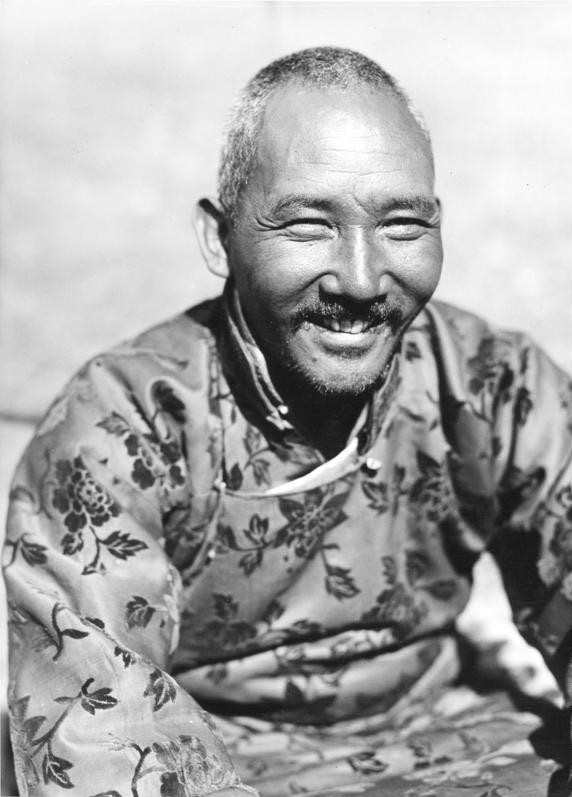
Möndö in 1939

Möndö studied mining engineering in Grimethorpe and mineralogy in Camborne. Back in Tibet, he went into mineral ore prospecting but was accused of disturbing spirits and spoiling crops and so had to give up prospecting.

=== Sonam Gonpa Gongkar ===
Gongkar went to the Royal Military Academy, Woolwich in London and then on to a short period of officer training with the Indian Army as he was expected to later reorganise the Tibetan Army. He was attached to the Northumberland Fusiliers for a short period. However, for political reasons, he was assigned to a frontier post in Kham. He died from pneumonia in 1917.

=== Rigzin Dorje Ringang ===
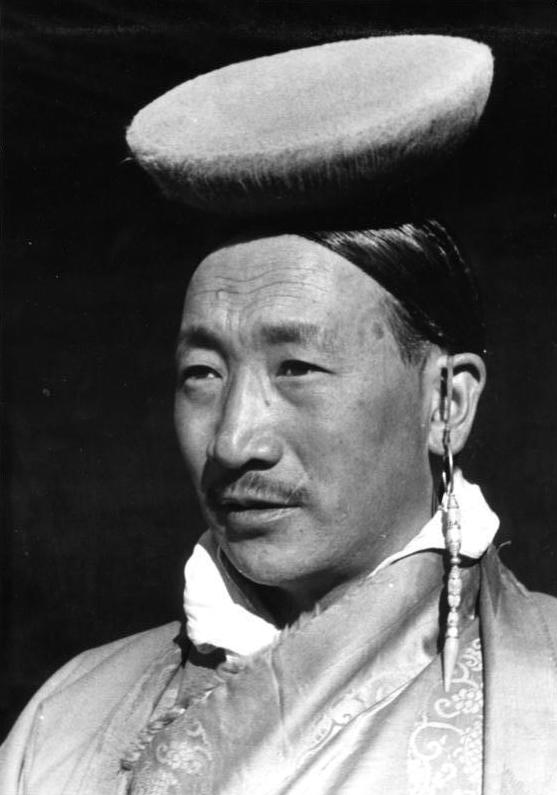
Ringang in 1939

The youngest of the lot, Ringang, stayed in England for a longer period and studied electrical engineering at the Universities of London and Birmingham. After returning home, he assembled a hydro-electric power station in Lhasa called Dodri from equipment brought over from England, and laid an electric line to the Dalai Lama's summer palace in Lhasa, a colossal undertaking. Of the Rugby Four, he was the only one to have achieved something. However, after his death, the plant stopped being maintained for lack of money and fell into disrepair. Peter Aufschnaiter wrote in his book Eight Years in Tibet,

"We arrived in Lhasa on 15 January 1946. (…) a man wearing a yellow and crimson hat- an official- approached us. He was very friendly. After asking a few questions, he said he would arrange different quarters for us. Our new friend was Lhasa's electrical engineer. After receiving permission from the town council, he gave us quarters in the storeroom of his house."

== The outcome ==
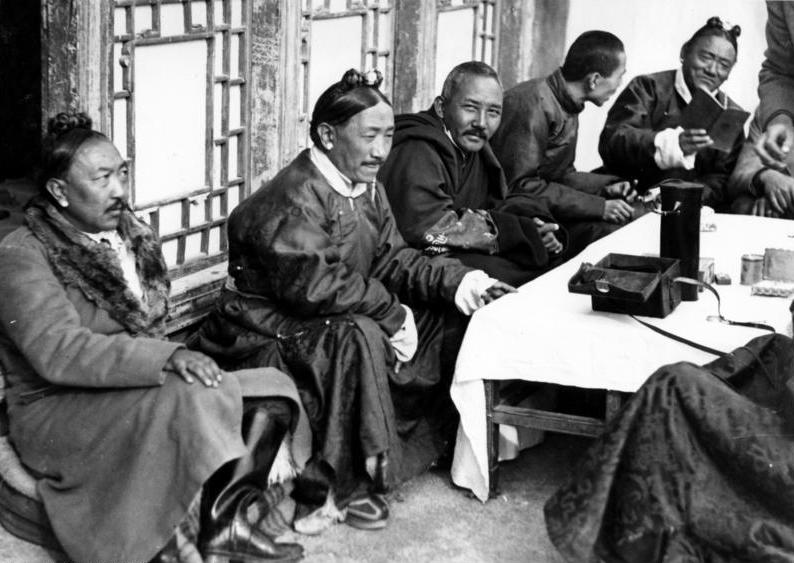
Three of the former Rugby Boys being entertained as guests by the members of the German SS expedition to Tibet in 1939 (from left to right: Kyipup, Ringang and Möndö, along with Chinese envoy Chang and Tsarong Dzasa)

As Lhalu Tsewang Dorje, Lungshar's son, remarked to British radio operator Robert W. Ford, "The experiment was not a great success" but, according to Ford, the fault did not lie entirely with the boys. Alastair Lamb claims that they were effectively side-tracked by the Tibetan establishment. The experiment was not to be repeated during the remaining period of British rule in the Indian subcontinent.

Tibetologist Alex McKay observes that the three surviving Rugby boys formed, together with their fellow countrymen that had been educated in British India or at Frank Ludlow's English school at Gyantse (1923–1926), "a growing circle of generally progressive thinkers, in whose company Europeans visitors felt comfortable" and who were recognised by the British cadre as "a major propaganda channel".

In 1946, when Austrian war prisoner Heinrich Harrer reached Lhasa, there was only one of the Rugby boys still alive, namely Kyipup, then a high official at the foreign ministry, whose meeting he recalls in his 1954 book Seven Years in Tibet. In the introduction to the book, writer Peter Fleming calls him "the only survivor of a sensible experiment that the Tibetans never got around to repeating."
