= Gyai'ra Losang Dainzin =

Tibetan politician of the PRC (born 1953)

Gyai'ra Losang Dainzin (Tibetan: རྒྱ་རས་བློ་བཟང་བསྟན་འཛིན, born c. 1953) is a Tibetan politician and governor.

In 2003, he became vice-chairman of the Tibet Autonomous Region government. He is the son of the noted politician Lhalu Tsewang Dorje.

He is also the grandson of Lungshar, who was an influential official in the Lhasa government and a favourite of the 13th Dalai Lama until his death in 1933.
