= Lungshar =

Tibetan reformist politician (1880–1938)

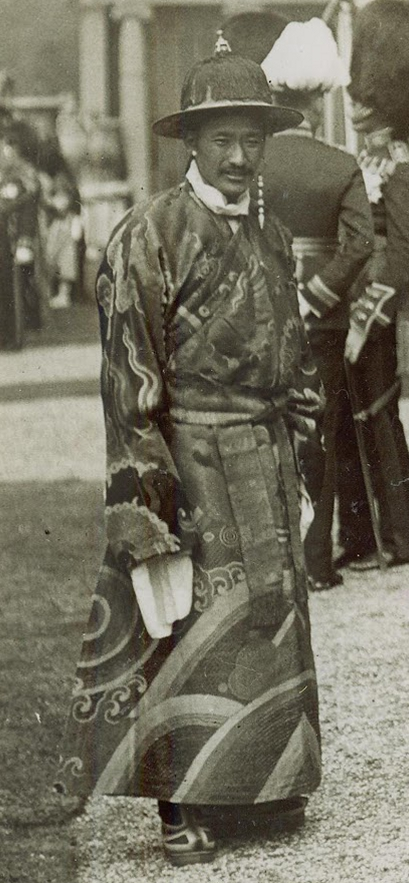
Lungshar at Buckingham Palace June 28, 1913 after the audience with King George V

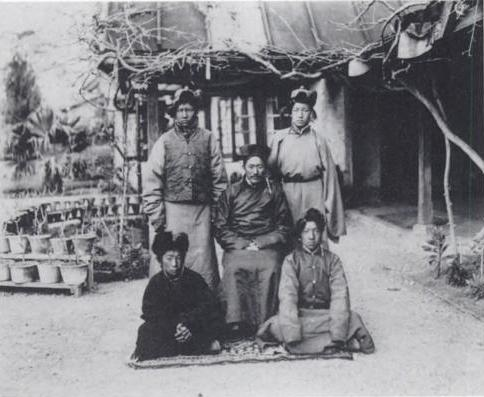
Lungshar and the four Tibetan students just before leaving for England

Tsipön Lungshar (Tibetan: རྩིས་དཔོན་ལུང༌ཤར), born Dorje Tsegyal (རྡོ་རྗེ་ཚེ་རྒྱལ; 1880–1938), was a Tibetan politician and noted reformist who was accused by conservative political opponents of attempting to become the paramount figure of the Tibetan government in the 1930s, by planning a communist coup following the death of the 13th Dalai Lama.

Lungshar was one of the 'three favourites', close aides cultivated over two decades by the 13th Dalai Lama, who assigned Tibet's modernisation program to him. The other aides were Tsarong and Kunpella, who were both from peasant stock. All three were said to be exceptionally talented and intelligent with great depth of character. The 'genius', Lungshar, was a doctor, musician, philosopher, poet and statesman.

As with Tsarong and Kunpella, as soon as their protector the 13th Dalai Lama died Lungshar became a target for the ultraconservative Lhasa elite who opposed all modernisation and reform: he was accused of plotting a coup and installing a communist system and was arrested along with, amongst others, the Dalai Lama's trusted personal attendants. Being a noble and thus seen as a greater threat than the other close aides, he was imprisoned and had his eyes gouged out to prevent any further political opposition from his side. The decision to blind the popular, reformist Lungshar came from Trimon, the reactionary chief minister who had been his chief political opponent.

== Background ==
Lungshar came from an aristocratic family with a history of service to the 5th Dalai Lama; his father was a Major (Rupön) in the Tibetan Army and he was an Accountant of the 6th rank in the Accountant-General's Office at Lhasa during the 13th Dalai Lama leadership. In 1912 the reform-minded Dalai Lama, who considered him one of his most able and trusted officials, sent him to England and several European nations to supervise four Tibetan students at Rugby School and to act as ambassador at large for Tibet. These students studied modern technology and English to facilitate the reforms the Dalai Lama felt necessary in Tibet. During his travels in Europe Lungshar learned English, encountered Western democracy, developed an appreciation of England's system of constitutional monarchy and became convinced that Tibet needed major political reform if it were to survive in the modern world.

On his return to Tibet he became the leader of a new progressive group in the Tibetan government and making great efforts to introduce reforms he became one of the most popular and respected officials in Tibet, except with the conservative nobles and the monastics who were not happy to pay taxes to fund an army, amongst other reforms which he tried to implement. It was 1914, at a time when the Dalai Lama was strengthening state institutions including the military. Lungshar was appointed tsipön, i.e. one of the four heads of the revenue office. He increased revenue for the state, at the expense of the aristocratic and monastic landlords, making enemies amongst the elite in the process.

In 1929, he became commander in chief of the military, still retaining his post of tsipön as well. He further strengthened and modernized the military, but lost his military post in 1931, after a diplomatic incident when his men pursued a miscreant into the Nepalese embassy. He remained tsipön until the Dalai Lama's death in 1933.

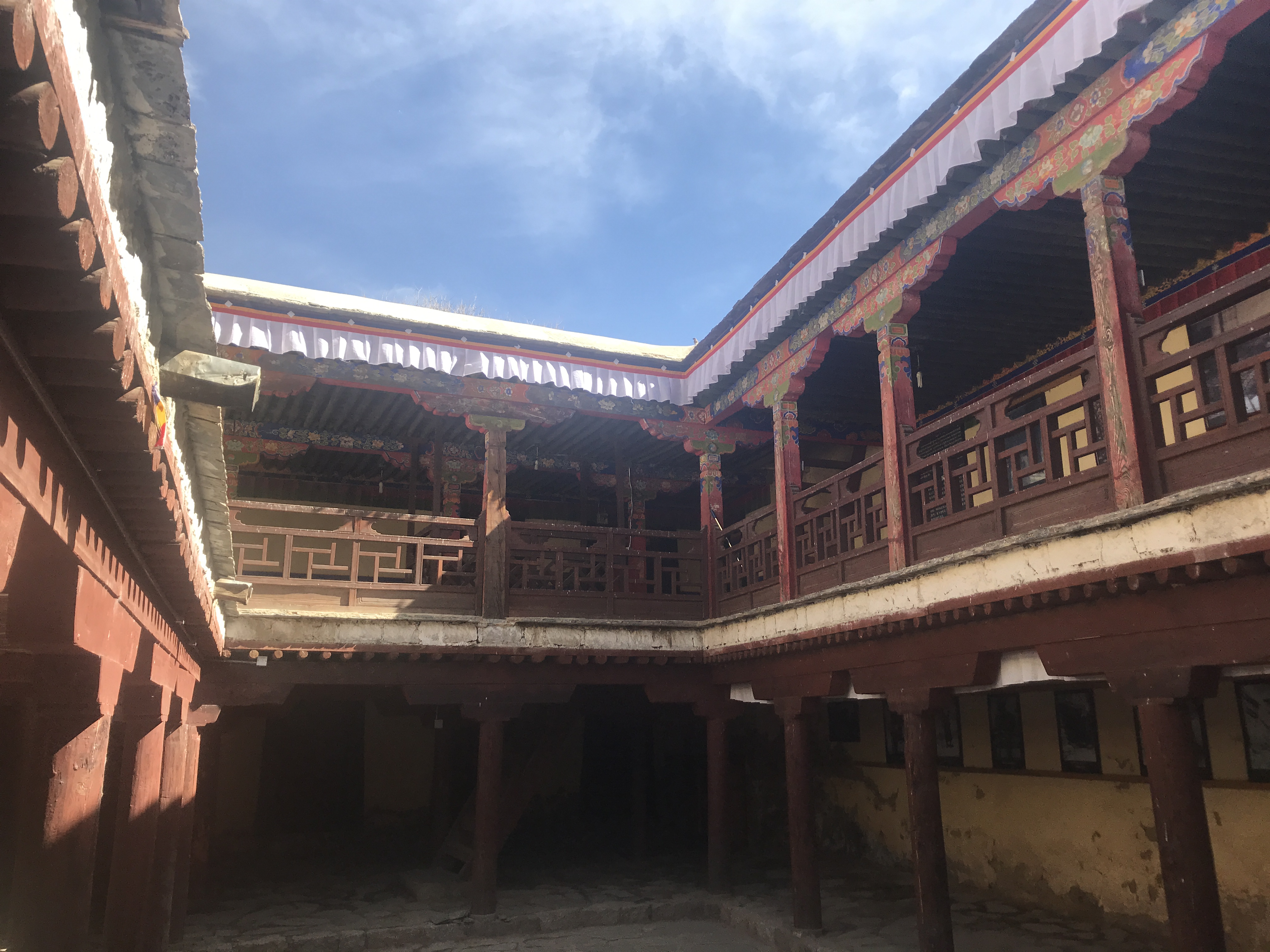
Lungshar's Residence in the Potala Palace complex.

Lungshar was one of several parties vying for control of the government following the Dalai Lama's death. He defeated rival Kumbela by launching a campaign of suspicion that Kumbela had brought about the Dalai Lama's death. Kumbela was exiled, but Lungshar failed to gain ascendency. Lungshar was eventually outmaneuvered by the more conservative minister Trimön. Lungshar was arrested and punished by the removal of his eyeballs. This was considered the most serious punishment short of death. No one alive had ever seen this punishment done, but members of the untouchable ragyaba class, who traditionally performed mutilation punishments, had been told by their parents how it was done.

The 14th Dalai Lama later assured Thomas Laird, however, that after the death of the 13th Dalai Lama Lungshar merely gathered those who wished to continue his modernisation campaign, with the main aim of having the government led by lay officials, rather than by monastics who lacked experience in administration. But the religious and lay conservatives who opposed modernisation accused him of treason. The swift arrest, imprisonment and blinding of Lungshar at Trimon's behest ended any further discussion of reform in Lhasa.

His son, Lhalu Tsewang Dorje, was also a noted politician.

According to certain sources, during the late 1920s, Lungshar promoted the idea that another of his sons was the reborn 16th Karmapa. The Dalai Lama and most of the officials in his government are members of the Gelug sect, while the Karmapa is the leader of the Karma Kagyü sect. These sources state that the Dalai Lama initially supported this claim in opposition to the supporters of the previous Karmapa, who had already recognised Rangjung Rigpe Dorje as the new Karmapa. However, as the child fell from a roof and died, the Dalai Lama later withdrew his support of Lungshar's son and agreed to the recognition of Rangjung Rigpe Dorje.

== See also ==
- Four Rugby Boys
