= Lhalu Tsewang Dorje =

Tibetan aristocrat and politician (1914–2011)

- ལྷ་ཀླུ་ཚེ་དབང་རྡོ་རྗེ་ 拉鲁·次旺多吉
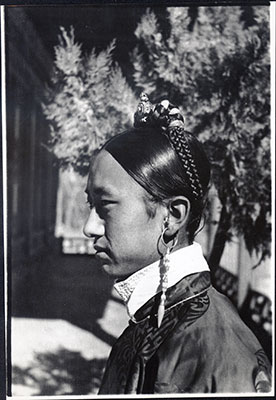
- Lhalu Tsewang Dorje on 8 January 1937 in photo taken by Frederick Spencer Chapman

Vice Chairman of the Tibet Autonomous Regional Political Consultative Conference
- In office April 1983 – January 2003
- Chairman: Yangling Dorje→Raidi→Pagbalha Geleg Namgyai

Member of the Chinese People's Political Consultative Conference (5th, 6th, 7th, 8th, 9th)
- In office August 1978 – March 2003

Finance Minister of Tibet
- In office 1946–1947
- Monarch: 14th Dalai Lama
- Preceded by: title created
- Succeeded by: Tsepon W. D. Shakabpa

Kalön of Tibet
- In office 1946–1952 Serving with Kashopa Chogyal Nyima (until 1949), Dokhar Püntsog Rabgye (since 1949), Ngabo Ngawang Jigme (since 1950), Khyenrab Wangchug (since 1951), Surkhang Wangchen Gelek, and Thupten Kunkhen
- Monarch: 14th Dalai Lama

Governor of Domai
- In office 1947 – September 1950
- Monarch: 14th Dalai Lama
- Preceded by: Yuthok Tashi Dhondup
- Succeeded by: Ngapoi Ngawang Jigme

Personal details
- Born: January 1914 Lhasa, Tibet
- Died: 15 September 2011 (aged 97) Lhasa, Tibet Autonomous Region, People's Republic of China
- Parent: Lungshar (father)

- Lhalu Tsewang Dorje

Tibetan name
- Tibetan: ལྷ་ཀླུ་ཚེ་དབང་རྡོ་རྗེ་
Transcriptions
- Wylie: lha klu tshe dbang rdo rje
- Tibetan Pinyin: Lhalu Cêwang Dojê

Chinese name
- Traditional Chinese: 拉魯·次旺多吉
- Simplified Chinese: 拉鲁·次旺多吉
Transcriptions
Standard Mandarin
- Hanyu Pinyin: Lālǔ Cìwàng Duōjí

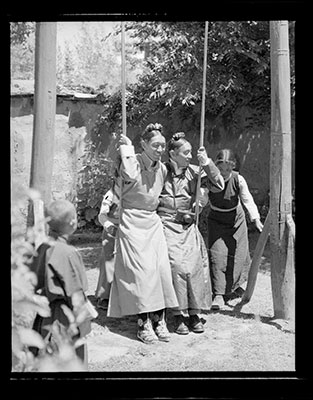
Lhalu Tsewang Dorje and Dundul Namgyal Tsarong in 1950

Lhalu Tsewang Dorje (Tibetan: ལྷ་ཀླུ་ཚེ་དབང་རྡོ་རྗེ་, Chinese: 拉鲁·次旺多吉, January 1914 – 15 September 2011) commonly known as Lhalu, Lhalu Se, or Lhalu Shape, was a Tibetan aristocrat and politician who held a variety of positions in various Tibetan governments before and after 1951.

== Biography ==
=== Early years ===
Lhalu's father was Lungsharwa Dorje Tsegyel, an influential official in the Lhasa government and a favourite of the 13th Dalai Lama's. His mother was Yangdzon Tsering, the Shatra family's youngest daughter, with whom Lungshar had been having an affair.

Lungshar was born into the noble Lhalu family whose ancestors lived in Tana of the Tsang region at the time of the 5th Dalai Lama. He is famous for taking four noble youths – "the Rugby Four" – to the United Kingdom to receive a modern education (for the first time in Tibet's history).

As a child, Lhalu attended a private school at the foot of the Potala Palace in Lhasa. He then went on to a school for children of secular officials at Jokhang monastery.

=== Earlier official positions ===
Following the Dalai Lama's death in 1934, Lungshar Dorje Tsegyel, a moderate reformist who advocated replacing lifelong tenure for the government ministers (Kalon) with a vote for a four-year term, was outmanœuvred by the more conservative minister Trimön; Lungshar was arrested and punished by blinding. All of Lungshar's descendants were then banned from government service. Lhalu had entered government service as a boy in 1927, but he was dismissed from his position after his father's arrest.

Lhalu was later adopted into the wealthy family of Lungshar's common law wife, the Lhalu family, which lacked a male heir. By making the public claim that Lungshar was not his biological father, and by applying in the name of Lhalu se and paying large bribes, he was able to become an official again in 1937, after which he became increasingly influential. The Lhalu family had attained nobility by producing two incarnations of the Dalai Lama but did not belong to the old nobility that traces back its lineage to ancient Tibetan kings.

In 1940, Lhalu married a daughter of the Labrang Nyingpa (Thonpa) family. In 1941, he was promoted to 4th rank and made a tsepön.

In 1946, he was appointed a shape, i.e. a member of cabinet, by the regent, Taktra. He played an active role in the arrest of the former regent, Reting Rinpoche, when Reting was charged with attempting to assassinate Taktra.

=== Governor of Kham ===
Shortly after the Reting incident, Lhalu was appointed governor of Kham, with his headquarters in Chamdo. He was serving in this position in 1949 when the People's Republic of China consolidated its control of China proper and began a build-up of troops in the provinces bordering Tibet. Lhalu began preparations to resist Chinese forces, but he was replaced by Ngabö Ngawang Jigme before the invasion actually occurred.

=== Robert W. Ford's testimony ===
In his book Captured in Tibet, Robert W. Ford, a former British radio operator in Kham, portrays Lhalu "as typical of the more progressive Tibetan officials. They knew they were backward, and genuinely wanted to learn and to modernize their country - so long as no harm was done to their religion." Although Lhalu had never left Tibet (unlike his father, who "was one of the very few Tibetans who ever went to Britain"), he "was keenly interested in the outside world and studied the pictures in [Ford's] illustrated magazines. He wanted to know about tractors and other agricultural machinery and about industrial processes in the West."

=== Commander-in-chief of the 1959 uprising ===
Lhalu returned to Lhasa in July 1951. After Tibet was annexed by the People's Republic of China, the Tibetan government was reorganised. He was dismissed from government service in May 1952 (on account of his maladministration of Kham during his tenure as Governor) but was allowed to retain his rank.

In 1955, he headed a delegation to Beijing and met Mao Zedong and Zhou Enlai.

In 1957, he was appointed "Governor of the grain supply".

According to American journalist and Marxist writer Anna Louise Strong, unlike some of the sincere signers of the 17-point agreement, Lhalu continued plotting for Tibet's secession from China.

In 1959, he participated in the Tibetan uprising, and would later describe himself as having been the commander-in-chief of the rebel forces.

He was captured, subjected to struggle sessions (known in Tibetan as thamzing), and imprisoned in Drapchi Prison.

At a mass meeting of ten thousand people in Lhasa circa 1959, he was implicated in the murders of former Regent Reting and tulku Geda, both supposedly sympathetic to the Chinese. He narrowly escaped being beaten up thanks to the protection of PLA soldiers.

=== Anna Louise Strong's testimony ===
In 1959, Anna Louise Strong was allowed to travel to Tibet to report on the political situation there. In a book published the following year, When Serfs Stood Up in Tibet, she described a hearing on Lhalu's treatment of his local serfs organized by the Fourth Inhabitants' Committee of the Western District of Lhasa. Lhalu, then 43 years old, was to reply to the accusations levelled at him by former serfs and slaves from one of his 24 manorial estates: mistreatment, non respect of his peasants and servants' rights, imprisonment in the manor's jail. Lhalu is forced to admit that he had been "too harsh", had "a touchy temper", had "made mistakes" or "gone to excess". The accusation meeting ends with the burning of his titles of debts (All "feudal debts" had been outlawed by the resolution passed 17 July by the Preparatory Committee for the Tibet Autonomous Region).

=== Political rehabilitation ===
After he was set free on special amnesty in 1965, Lhalu took up farming.

With Deng Xiaoping's return to office and the abandonment of the class-struggle line, he was given a job in 1977 and was eventually politically rehabilitated in 1983, becoming one of the vice-chairmen of the Tibetan Committee of the Chinese People's Political Consultative Conference.

=== Political stances ===
He has praised the Chinese government's policies in Tibet and has been strongly critical of the old Tibetan government and of the Dalai Lama. He said in an interview, "I have become disappointed with the Dalai Lama," and "[h]e does not behave like a reincarnated living Buddha but is a stooge of the Westerners."

According to English writer Patrick French, in 1999 he took his distance from the official rhetoric, indicating that he was missing his former friends and that he wished the return of the Dalai Lama: "There is a Tibetan saying: 'Old bird misses forests and old people miss hometown'. I sincerely wish the Fourteenth Dalai Lama will return, in the interests of the motherland, at an early date and join us in socialist construction."

Lhalu's recollections of his life appear in his book, Recalling the Road I Took.

=== His children ===
He has one daughter and five sons (three of which are reincarnated Lamas, so called "Tulkus"). In 2003, his son Gyai'ra Losang Dainzin (Jagra Lobsang Tenzin) became vice-chairman of the Tibet Autonomous Region government.

== His published work ==
- Recalling the Road I Took (published both in Tibetan and Chinese; does not seem to have been translated into English)
- Collected Materials of Literature and History in Tibet, a multi-volume compilation he has spent much of his time editing and publishing, Cultural and Historical Materials Office, Beijing
- Recollections of My Father Dorje Tsegye Lungshar, in Collected Materials of Literature and History in Tibet, Cultural and Historical Materials Office, Nationalities Publishing House, Beijing, 1983, 2:93-109
- The Purple Kasaya, coll. Tibetan People (2/4) (DVD), 2007

== Death ==
On 15 September 2011, Lhalu Tsewang Dorje died in Lhasa at the age of 97, as announced in Chinese by Tibet Daily, at the time of the funeral, 18 September, in Lhasa.
