= Lhasa Auditorium =

Theater in Lhasa, Tibet, China

The Lhasa Auditorium (Chinese: 拉萨大礼堂) is a theater in Lhasa, Tibet Autonomous Region, China, and the first theater in the history of Tibet, which was inaugurated on April 15, 1956. The auditorium is located in South Street, West End, Yutuo Road, Lhasa.

== History ==
On April 22, 1956, the inaugural meeting of the Preparatory Committee for the Tibet Autonomous Region was held in the newly completed Lhasa Auditorium. Dalai Lama Tenzin Gyatso and Choekyi Gyaltsen, 10th Panchen Lama delivered speeches.

In July 1956, the first elementary school in the history of Tibet, Lhasa Primary School, held its first graduation ceremony at the Lhasa Auditorium, with Ngapoi Ngawang Jigme and others attending the ceremony and delivering speeches.
