= Lhasa Middle School =

School in Lhasa, Tibet, China

Coordinates: 29.66105°N 91.11136°E

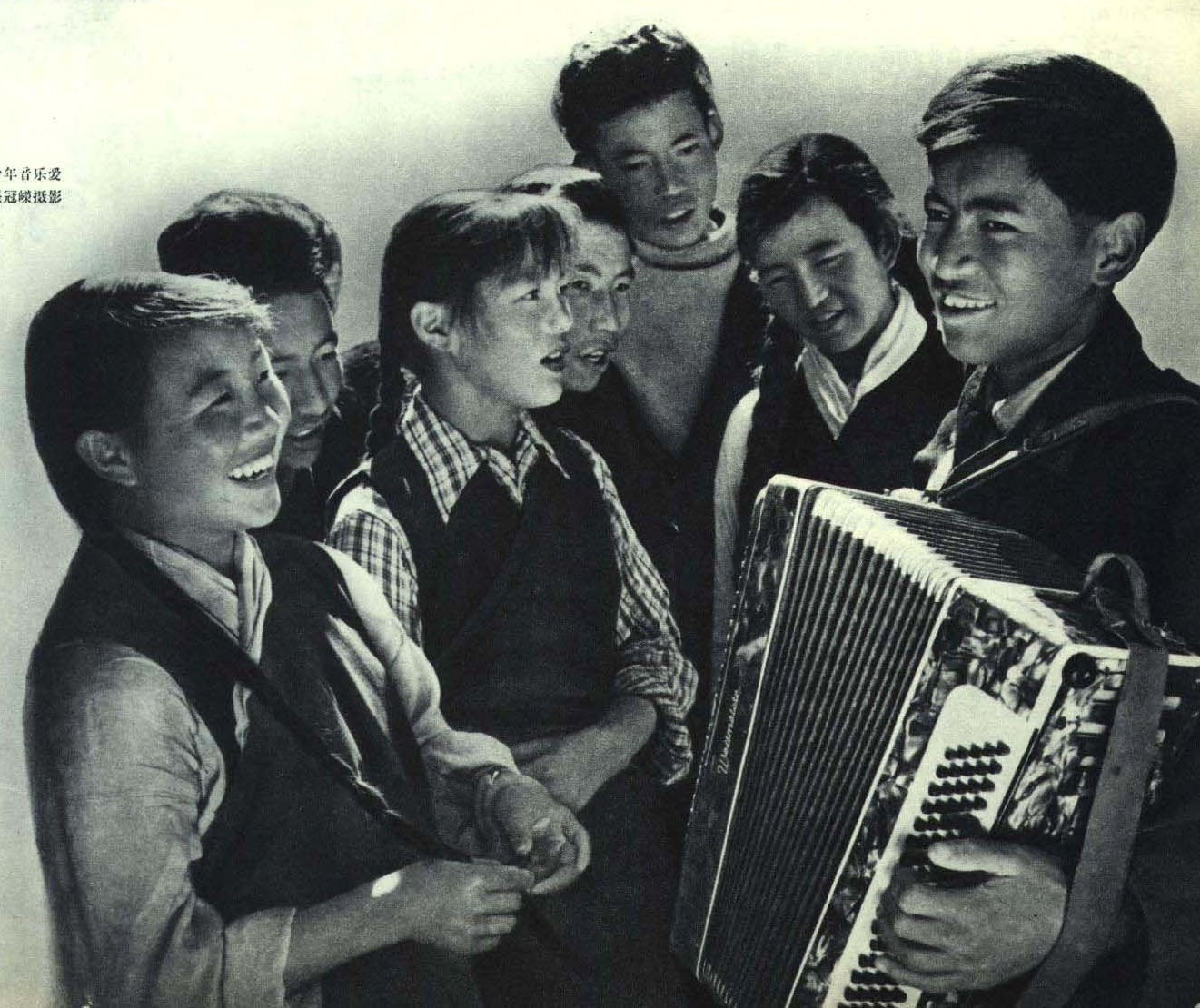
Students at Lhasa Middle School in 1956

Lhasa Middle School of the Tibet Autonomous Region (Chinese: 西藏自治区拉萨中学, Tibetan: ལྷ་ས་སློབ་འབྲིང་, Wylie: lha sa slob 'bring) is an autonomous regionally-run middle school of the Tibet Autonomous Region of China, the first middle school in the history of Tibet, and is now directly under the Department of Education of the TAR, and is a modernized, general middle school. The middle school is located on West Linkor Road in Lhasa.

== History ==
In April 1956, Vice Premier Chen Yi, during his visit to Lhasa Primary School, suggested that Lhasa Middle School should be founded as soon as possible. In July, the Preparatory Committee of the Autonomous Region made the Resolution on the Establishment of Lhasa Secondary School.

Lhasa Middle School opened on September 20, 1956, with five junior high school classes, two junior high school preparatory classes, two teacher training classes and one teacher class, with a total of 58 teaching staff and 650 students. The junior high school class established a morning meditation class in addition to the regular secondary school curriculum. They prayed and recited Buddhist scriptures every morning, had a living Buddha teach the scribe class, and allowed the Hui teachers and students to attend Friday worship services at home. In 1957, the scribe class was closed down, and the junior high school class and the teacher's short training class were reorganized. In 1977, the school was changed into the first secondary school of Lhasa City, which was designated as a key secondary school of the Tibet Autonomous Region. In 1984, it was changed into the Lhasa Secondary School of the Tibet Autonomous Region, which is directly under the Tibet Autonomous Region, and the first secondary school of Lhasa City. In 1984, the school was transformed into the Lhasa Middle School of the Tibet Autonomous Region, directly under the Department of Education of the Tibet Autonomous Region. In 1985, the school recruited 78 students from the border ethnic minorities such as the Menba, Lhoba, Nakhi and the Sherpas, and set up 2 border ethnic minority classes.
