= Lhalu Pohang =

Building in Lhasa, Tibet, China

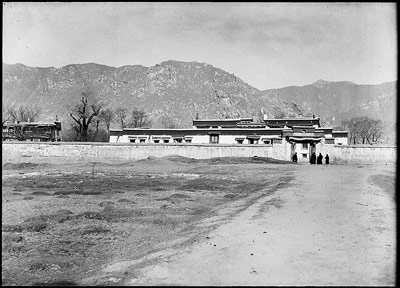
Lhalu Pohang in 1921

Lhalu Pohang (Chinese: 拉鲁颇章, Tibetan: ལྷ་ཀླུ་ཕོ་བྲང་།, Wylie: lha klu pho brang), Lhalu Mansion, or Lhalu Podrang, situated in the community of Lhalu on Gongdelin Street, Chengguan District, Lhasa, the Tibet Autonomous Region, was originally a pohang of the Lhalu family, nearby the Lhalu Wetland.

== History ==
Lhalu pohang is located in the north of Lhasa city, built in the late 18th century to the early 19th century, for the 8th Dalai and 12th Dalai Lama family residence. Existing compound sitting north to south, for three Tibetan-style building, a total area of 3800 square meters.

Lhalu pohang used to be built on a lake, with a corridor-like long bridge connecting it to the land. In 1980s to 1990s, the nearby large and small lakes were filled in for the construction of highways. In 1997, the Lhalu Community Resident Committee was established, and then moved into the office of the Lhalu Pohang. In 2013, the new office building of the Lhalu Community Resident Committee was constructed, and the Lalu Committee was relocated out of the Lalu Pohang.

== See also ==
- Lhalu family
- Lalu Wetlands National Nature Preserve
