= Fifth Geda Rinpoche =

Tibetan Buddhist lama

The Fifth Geda Rinpoche (simplified Chinese: 格达·洛桑登真·扎巴他耶; traditional Chinese: 格達·洛桑登真·扎巴他耶; Tibetan: དགེ་རྟགས་རིན་པོ་ཆེ་བློ་བཟང་བསྟན་འཛིན་གྲགས་པ་མཐའ་ཡས་, Wylie: dge rtags rin po che blo bzang bstan 'dzin grags pa mtha' yas; 1902/1903—22 August 1950), also known as Getag Tulku, was a Tibetan Buddhist lama and the fifth Geda Rinpoche of Beri Monastery in Kham. He helped the Chinese Red Army during the Long March in 1936 and later served in the government of Xikang Province. He died in Chamdo on 22 August 1950 while travelling to Lhasa for talks with the Tibetan government.

== Early life ==
Geda was born in Desidi Village, Garzê County, in either 1902 or 1903. His birth name was Genga Yideng (根嘎益登). He was chosen as the fifth reincarnation of the Geda lama lineage when he was a child. He later went to Lhasa to study Buddhism and earned the Geshe degree. After returning to Garzê, he became the head of Beri Monastery.

== The Long March ==
Beri Monastery supported the Kuomintang during a conflict with Dhargye Monastery and the Tibetan government between 1931 and 1934. When the Red Army reached Garzê in 1936, Geda agreed to help its soldiers. He met the Communist commander Zhu De and helped provide food and other supplies. He also helped wounded soldiers who remained in the area after the army left.

In April 1936, Geda and other religious leaders signed an agreement with the Red Army. The following month, he became vice-chairman of the Bopa government, which had been formed with Communist support in Garzê.

The reasons for Geda's support of the Red Army have been described differently. Chinese accounts present him as a supporter of the Communist Party. Other Tibetan accounts suggest that he was mainly concerned with protecting Tibetan interests.

== Death ==
In 1950, Geda was appointed vice-chairman of the Xikang provincial government. He left Garzê on 10 July to travel to Lhasa, hoping to persuade Tibetan officials to hold talks with the new Chinese government. He reached Chamdo but was not allowed to continue to Lhasa. He died there on 22 August 1950.

The cause of his death remains disputed. Chinese authorities accused Robert W. Ford, a British radio operator working for the Tibetan government, of poisoning him. Ford denied the accusation. Other accounts blamed Tibetan officials or suggested that Geda had died from illness.

== Memorial ==
In November 1950, the Southwest Military and Administrative Committee held a memorial service for Geda in Chongqing. More than 800 people attended, including Deng Xiaoping and Wang Weizhou. Other ceremonies were held in Xikang. A memorial stupa was built for him at Beri Monastery.

In 1951, government delegations visited Beri Monastery and met Geda's family. They brought 100 packages of Tibetan tea and a banner bearing a message written by Mao Zedong.

Beri Monastery was listed as a protected cultural site of Sichuan Province in 1980. In November 1993, the Zhu De and Fifth Geda Rinpoche Memorial Hall (朱德总司令和五世格达活佛纪念馆) was established in Garzê County. It contains a statue of Geda with Zhu De, along with photographs and objects from the Long March. The museum became a provincial patriotic education site in 2003.

In December 2003, a ceremony marking the 100th anniversary of Geda's birth was held in Chengdu. Liu Yandong also wrote an article about his life. A 20-episode television series, Geda Living Buddha (格达活佛), starring Duobujie, began airing on CCTV-1 on 2 December 2005.
