= Tsering Yangzom =

Tibetan-Bhutanese woman (1924–2024)

Tsering Yangzom Tess La
- ཚེ་རིང་དབྱང་འཛོམས།
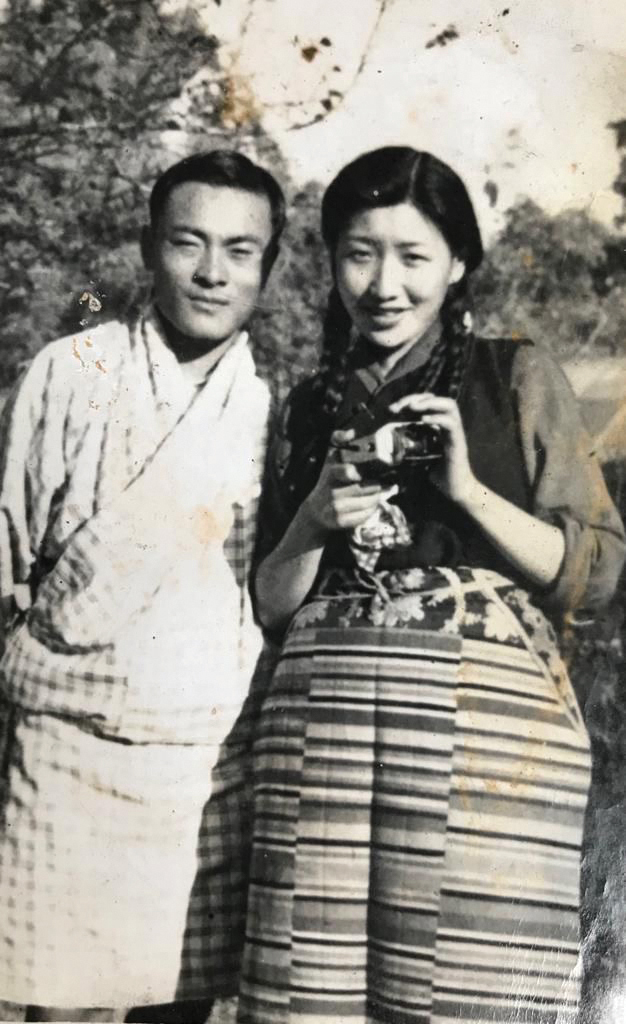
- Yangzom (right) with Jigme Dorji Wangchuck, the King of Bhutan
- Born: 1924; Tibet
- Died: 27 June 2024 (aged 99–100); Thimphu, Bhutan
- Spouse(s): Jigme Palden Dorji (1942–1964; his death); Samchok (1965–c. 1980s; his death)

Tsering Yangzom (Standard Tibetan: ཚེ་རིང་དབྱང་འཛོམས།; 1924–2024), also known as Tessla Dorji, was a Tibetan woman who was the spouse of Jigme Palden Dorji, the first Prime Minister of Bhutan.

== Early life and education ==
Yangzom was born in 1924; the Tsering family was a noble Tibetan family from Sa'gya in Ü-Tsang. Her father, Tsarong Dasang Dramdul, was a politician and general who was a close aide of the 13th Dalai Lama, Thubten Gyatso. The Dalai Lama arranged for Yangzom's father to marry Tsering Drolma, the second daughter of Tsering Wangchug Gyalpo, a member of the Kashag who had been assassinated in 1912, to enable him to inherit the Tsering family's property. Drolma had previously been married to a member of the Horkhang family, a noble family from Maizhokunggar, but had returned to Sa'gya following her husband's death. Dasang Dramdul and Drolma had six children together, with Yangzom being their eldest daughter.

Yangzom studied at Mount Hermon School, a Christian boarding school in Darjeeling. While there, she took the English name "Tess", and later became commonly known as "Tessla", with la (ལགས་) being a term of respect. Prior to the Chinese annexation of Tibet in 1951, Yangzom and her sisters regularly appeared at political gatherings and parties in Lhasa.

== Marriage to Jigme Palden Dorji ==
Yangzom first met Jigme Palden Dorji, a member of the prominent Dorji family from Bhutan, while she was studying at Mount Hermon School. Her father had requested that she return to Tibet to marry a local man. Palden Dorji wrote to his father, Sonam Topgay Dorji, the Chief Minister of Bhutan, to propose a marriage between Yangzom and Palden Dorji to the Tsering family. While intermarriage between Tibetans and Bhutanese people was not common at the time, Yangzom's father did eventually agree to the marriage, and she and Palden Dorji married in November 1942 in Kalimpong.

In 1952, Jigme Palden became the first Prime Minister of Bhutan, supporting the newly crowned king, Jigme Dorji Wangchuck. While Yangzom did not hold any official position in government, and the role of first lady being held by the king's wife, Kesang Choden, she promoted causes including education and diplomacy, and entertained foreign guests during state visits. Yangzom visited Australia in 1962 as part of an all-women delegation consisting of her, her sister-in-law Tashi Dorji, and Jigme Palden's secretary Benita Dunne, in support of Bhutan's efforts to join the Colombo Plan; Jigme Palden and his own male delegation had been unable to attend following the outbreak of the Sino-Indian War. The visit was a success, and Bhutan was invited to join the plan, marking the first international organisation that Bhutan attained membership of.

The Indian diplomat Apa Pant described Yangzom as being "beautiful and affectionate" and recalled her telling stories from Tibetan mythology to Bhutanese children during his visits to Bhutan.

== Widowhood ==
Jigme Palden was assassinated on 6 April 1964 while playing cards in Phuntsholing. Following his death, Yangzom moved to Mussoorie in India, where she worked as a Tibetan teacher at the Central School for Tibetans, and later remarried in 1965 to Samchok, a Tibetan refugee. After her second husband died during the 1980s, Yangzom returned to Bhutan, where she lived at the Dorji family's residence in Lanjophakha, Thimphu.

Yangzom died on 27 June 2024 in Lanjophakha, at the age of 100.
