= Dogan Penjor Rabgye =

Tibetan PLA general (1903–1957)

- མདོ་མཁར་ཕུན་ཚོགས་རབ་རྒྱས། 朵噶·彭措饶杰
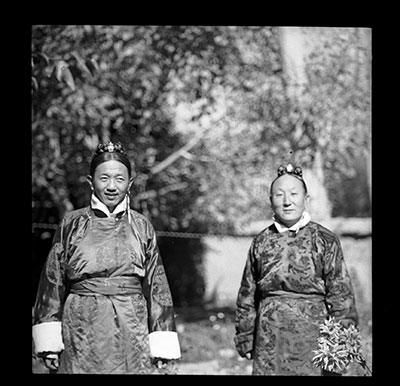
- Surkhang Wangchen Gelek (left) and Dogan Penjor Rabgye (right) in a garden, 1950.

Governor of North Tibet
- In office 1950–1955
- Monarch: 14th Dalai Lama

Kalön of Tibet
- In office 1949–1957 Serving with Thupten Kunkhen (until 1951), Lhalu Tsewang Dorje (until 1952), Ngabo Ngawang Jigme (since 1950), Khyenrab Wangchug (since 1951), Liushar Thubten Tharpa (since 1955), and Surkhang Wangchen Gelek
- Monarch: 14th Dalai Lama
- Preceded by: Kashopa Chogyal Nyima
- Succeeded by: Sampho Tsewang Rigzin

Personal details
- Born: 1903 Lhasa, Tibet, Qing empire
- Died: 13 March 1957 (aged 53–54) Shigatse, People's Republic of China
- Awards: Order of Liberation (First Class Medal)

Military service
- Allegiance: Tibet; People's Republic of China
- Branch/service: (Tibet) Tibetan Army; People's Liberation Army Ground Force
- Rank: General (Tibet); Lieutenant General (China)
- Commands: Commander-in-chief, Tibetan Army; Deputy Commander, PLA Tibet Military District
- Battles/wars: Annexation of Tibet

- Dogan Penjor Rabgye

Tibetan name
- Tibetan: མདོ་མཁར་ཕུན་ཚོགས་རབ་རྒྱས།
Transcriptions
- Wylie: mdo mkhar phun tshogs rab rgyas

Chinese name
- Traditional Chinese: 朵噶·彭措饒傑
- Simplified Chinese: 朵噶·彭措饶杰
Transcriptions
Standard Mandarin
- Hanyu Pinyin: Duogá Péngcuò ráojié

Dogan Penjor Rabgye (Tibetan: མདོ་མཁར་ཕུན་ཚོགས་རབ་རྒྱས།, Chinese: 朵噶·彭措饶杰, 1903 – 13 March 1957), alternate names Raokashag Penjor Rabgye (Chinese: 饶噶厦·彭措饶杰; pinyin: Ráogáxià Péngcuò ráojié) and Phuntsok Rabgye Ragashar, was an ethnic Tibetan general in the People's Liberation Army and a high-ranking official of the People's Republic of China originating from Lhasa, Tibet.

Born in 1903 within a Tibetan noble family, at the age of 6 he attended a Tibetan school for nobles, and in 1923 began working within the kashag. During this time he was appointed various positions, including general manager of the Lhasa Police, government secretary, head commissioner of Cona County in Lhokha Prefecture, regimental commander within the Tibetan army, and commander-in-chief of the Tibetan army. In August 1949 he was promoted as a kalön to general commander of the Tibetan army. At the beginning of 1950, whilst he was the head of northern Tibet he commanded the 16th Tibetan army garrisoned in Nagchu.

After the annexation of Tibet by the People's Republic of China, in 1952 he became the second-in-command of the People's Liberation Army within the Tibet area. In the summer of 1953, he was appointed by the 14th Dalai Lama and 10th Panchen Lama as the regimental commander of the national day ceremony, and was sent to Beijing to participate in the 4th year anniversary celebrations of the founding of the People's Republic of China. Soon after, he led a delegation which travelled to Beijing, Tianjin, Shanghai, Shenyang, Nanjing, Hangzhou and Xining for half a year. After returning to Beijing, he issued a Tibetan-language broadcast on China National Radio. In January 1954, as a delegate of the government of the People's Republic of China, he attended bilateral negotiations between China and India. In 1955 he was awarded the rank of lieutenant general. In 1956, he was elected as a committee member of the Preparationary Committee of the Tibet Autonomous Region, and later accompanied the Dalai Lama in his visit to India for the 2,500 year birthday anniversary of the Siddhartha Gautama. As the Dalai Lama returned to China in February 1957 via Sikkim, Dogan Penjor Rabgye died of illness on 13 March 1957 while passing by Shigatse.

== See also ==
- Ngapoi Ngawang Jigme
