= Beri Monastery =

Tibetan Buddhist monastery in Sichuan, China

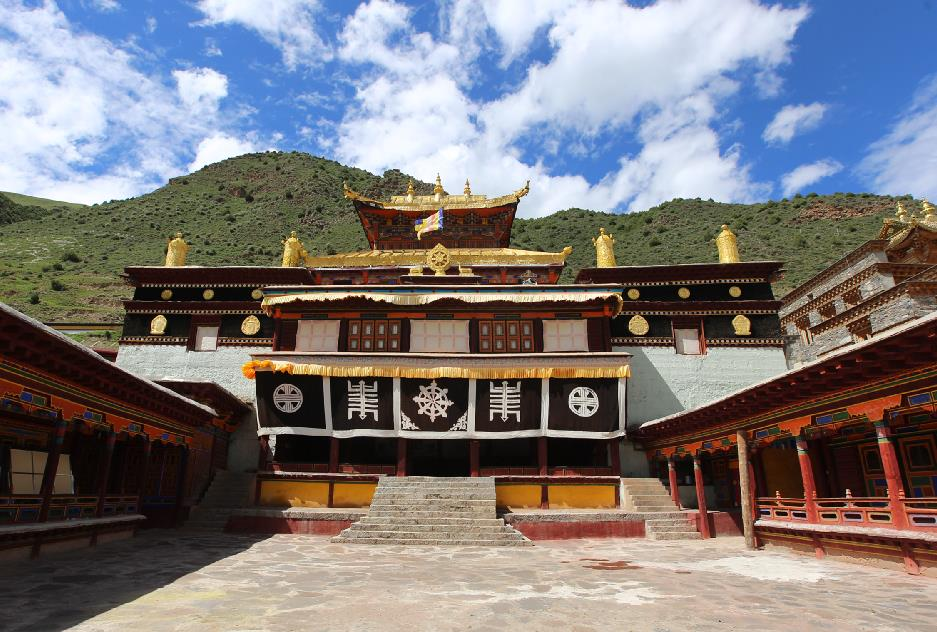
Beri Monastery

Beri Monastery (Tibetan: བེ་རི་དཔལ་ལྡན་འགྲོ་ཕན་གླིང་; Chinese: 白利寺; pinyin: Báilì Sì), also called Baili Temple, is a Gelug Buddhist monastery in Garzê County, Sichuan, China. It stands west of Garzê town in the Tibetan region of Kham. The monastery was founded in the 17th century and is the seat of the Geda Rinpoche (Getak Tulku) lineage.

== History ==
Beri Monastery was built on the site of an older hermitage called Gela Daden. In the 17th century, Ngawang Puntsok, a disciple of the 5th Dalai Lama, established thirteen monasteries in the Garzê region to spread the Gelug school of Tibetan Buddhism. Beri was one of these monasteries.

According to a local history, Beri was once a Bon monastery. Ngawang Yeshe converted it to the Gelug school in 1649. Ngawang Puntsok rebuilt the monastery in 1662 and gave it the name Baili Jixiang Zhongli Yuan (白利吉祥众利院).

The 6th Panchen Lama, Lobsang Palden Yeshe, later consecrated a chapel at Beri. The Qianlong Emperor also presented a wooden plaque bearing his calligraphy. Ngawang Yeshe became the first Geda Lama, whose successors continued to lead the monastery.

The Fifth Geda Rinpoche helped the Chinese Red Army when it passed through Garzê during the Long March in 1936. He remained the head of Beri Monastery and serverd various government posts until his death in 1950.

Beri Monastery was listed as a protected cultural site of Sichuan Province in 1980. The Sixth Geda Rinpoche carried out repairs in 1982. In 2006, the monastery was listed as a Major Historical and Cultural Site Protected at the National Level.

== Restoration ==
In 2000, the Tibet Heritage Fund inspected Beri Monastery and found cracks in its walls and wooden frame. Water had entered through the roof, damaging parts of the building and its wall paintings. Some of the paintings had begun to peel away from the walls.

Restoration began in late 2001 with the help of local authorities and the monastery. The upper two floors were partly rebuilt, while the original ground-floor wooden structure, rammed earth walls and wall paintings were kept. Most of the work was finished by late 2003.

The Tibet Heritage Fund trained 90 local villagers in traditional building methods for the project. Craftsmen who had worked on the restoration of old buildings in Lhasa supervised their work. The project received funding from MISEREOR, Cultural Heritage without Borders and the Trace Foundation.
