= Sampho Tsewang Rigzin =

Tibetan politician and soldier (1904–1973)

- བསམ་ཕོ་ཚེ་དབང་རིག་འཛིན་ 桑颇·才旺仁增
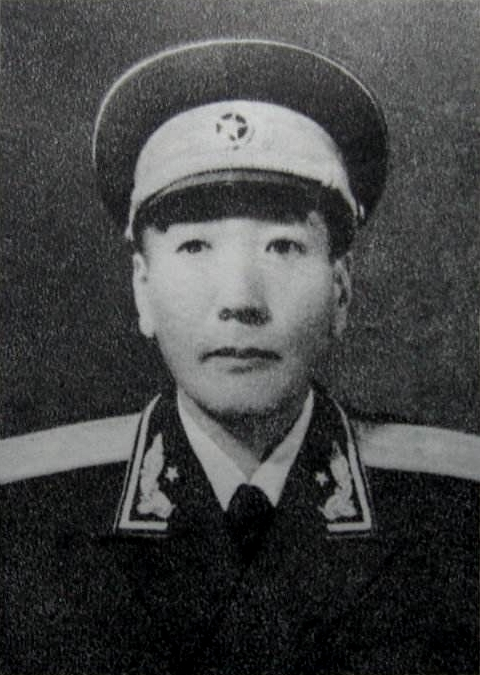
- Sampho Tsewang Rigzin in PLA uniform, c. 1955

Vice-Chairman of the Tibet Autonomous Region
- In office 1959–1973
- Chairman: Zeng Yongya; Ren Rong

Member of the 4th Chinese People's Political Consultative Conference
- In office 1965–1973
- Chairman: Zhou Enlai

Kalön of the Kashag
- In office 1957–1959 Serving with Ngabo Ngawang Jigme and Liushar Thubten Tharpa
- Monarch: 14th Dalai Lama
- Preceded by: Dogan Penjor Rabgye
- Succeeded by: Position abolished

Personal details
- Born: 1905 Lhasa, Tibet, Great Qing
- Died: 1973 (aged 67–68)
- Party: Chinese Communist Party
- Relations: Palden Thondup Namgyal (son-in-law)
- Children: Samyo Kushoe Sangideki (daughter)

Military service
- Allegiance: People's Republic of China
- Branch/service: People's Liberation Army
- Rank: Major General (Jiang)
- Commands: Deputy Commander, Tibet Military District

Sampho Tsewang Rigzin (Note: Tibetan: བསམ་ཕོ་ཚེ་དབང་རིག་འཛིན་, Wylie: bsam pho tshe dbang rig 'dzin; Chinese: 桑颇·才旺仁增; pinyin: Sāngpō Cáiwàng Rénzēng) (1904–1973) was a Tibetan politician and soldier. After the annexation of Tibet by the People's Republic of China in 1951, he joined the Chinese Communist Party and the People's Liberation Army, attaining the rank of major general (shaojiang) in the latter. He served as a Kalön of the Tibetan Kashag from 1957 to 1959. He was later purged by Chinese officials during the Cultural Revolution and publicly humiliated in a struggle session.

== Biography ==
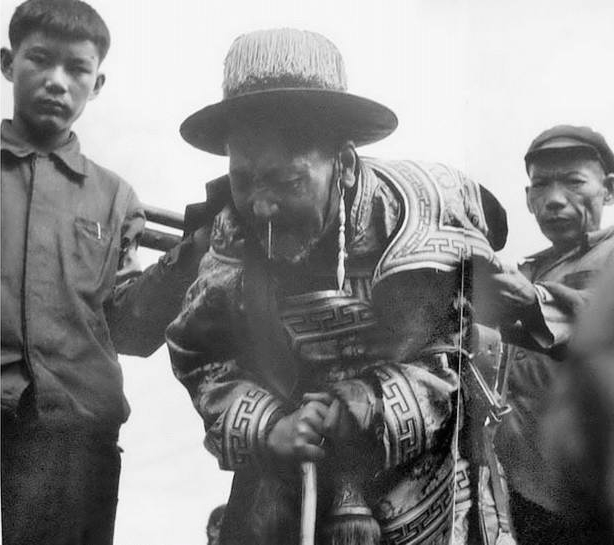
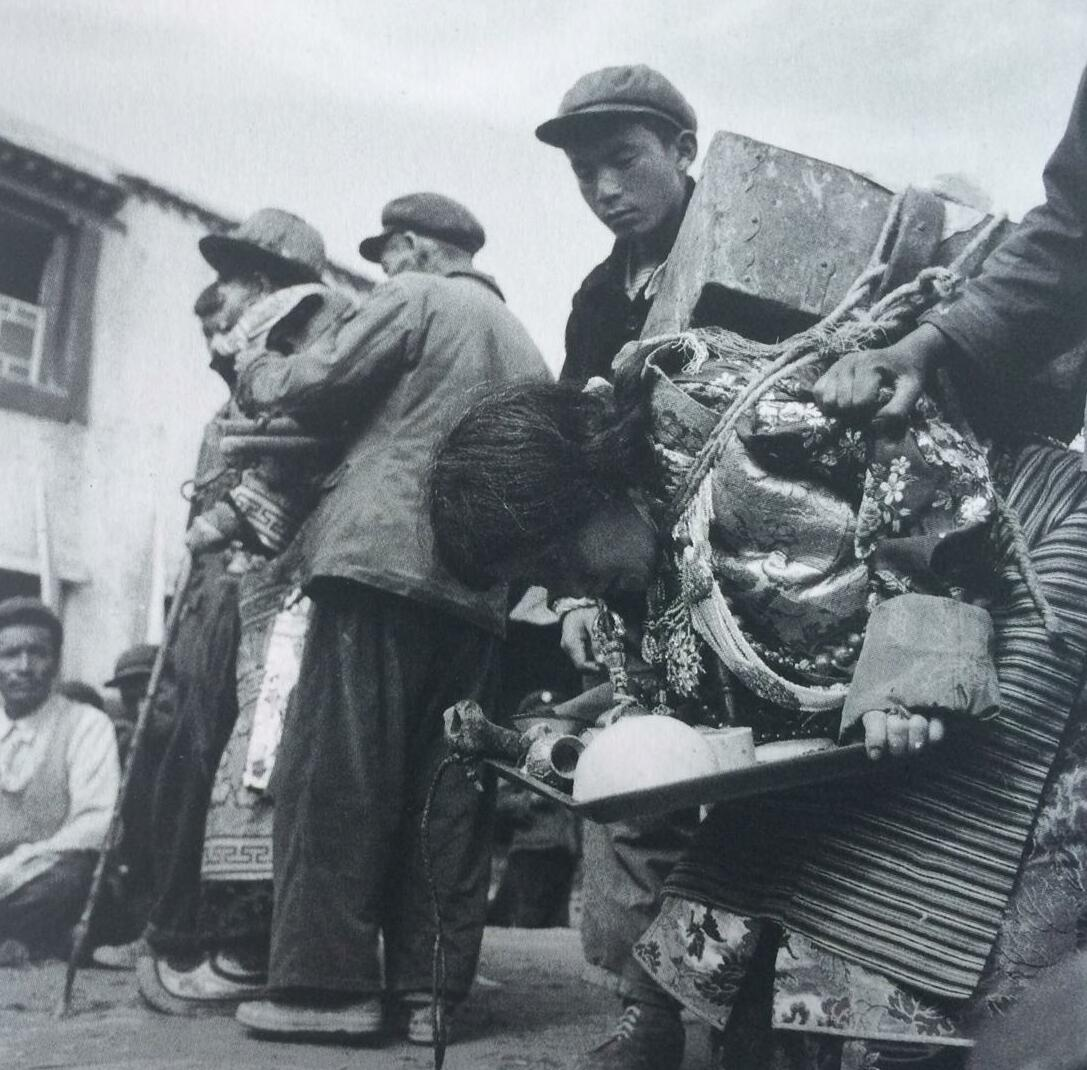
Sampho Tsewang Rigzin and his wife during a struggle session amid the Cultural Revolution, August 1966.

Sampho Tsewang Rigzin was born in 1905 to the Sampho noble family of the Tibetan aristocracy and inherited the title of Taiji. A native of Lhasa, he received homeschooling and local private school education before being sent to India to study artillery technology. He began his political career at the age of 14, assuming his first post within the Tibetan government in 1919.

Following the 1951 annexation of Tibet by the People's Republic of China, he joined the Chinese Communist Party and the People's Liberation Army. In 1952 he became a member of the board of directors for Lhasa Primary School, his first position as a member of the Communist Party. In 1956 he served in the standing committee of the Tibet Autonomous Region and in the following year he was appointed as a Kalön of the Kashag, the highest office in the province. He was promoted to shaojiang, the Chinese equivalent of major general, in 1958 and appointed deputy commander of the Tibetan Military Region. When the Kashag was abolished in 1959, he became Vice-Chairman of the Tibet Autonomous Region government.

During the 1959 Tibetan uprising, he was attacked by Tibetan dissidents while driving near Norbulingka, resulting in serious bodily injuries. He later served as a member of the National Defense Commission and was elected to the 4th Chinese People's Political Consultative Conference in 1965.

During the Cultural Revolution, he was accused of "organizing an armed rebellion, maintaining illicit relations with foreign countries, and being against the [Communist] Party and against the proletarian dictatorship." He was subsequently dressed in clothing traditionally worn by Tibetan aristocrats and photographed while being publicly denounced and humiliated in a struggle session in August 1966. His wife was also denounced alongside him, and forced to carry a tray containing various religious instruments while wearing heavy gold and silver pearls.

He died in 1973; his wife died shortly after. In 1979, he was posthumously rehabilitated by the Central Committee of the Chinese Communist Party.
