= Lhalu family =

Tibetan noble family

The Lhalu family is a Tibetan noble family who are known in Tibet for producing the 8th Dalai Lama.

== See also ==
- Patrick French, Tibet, Tibet, une histoire personnelle d'un pays perdu, translated from English by William Oliver Desmond, Albin Michel, 2005
- Lhalu Pohang
