= Dob-dob =

Type of Tibetan monk fraternity

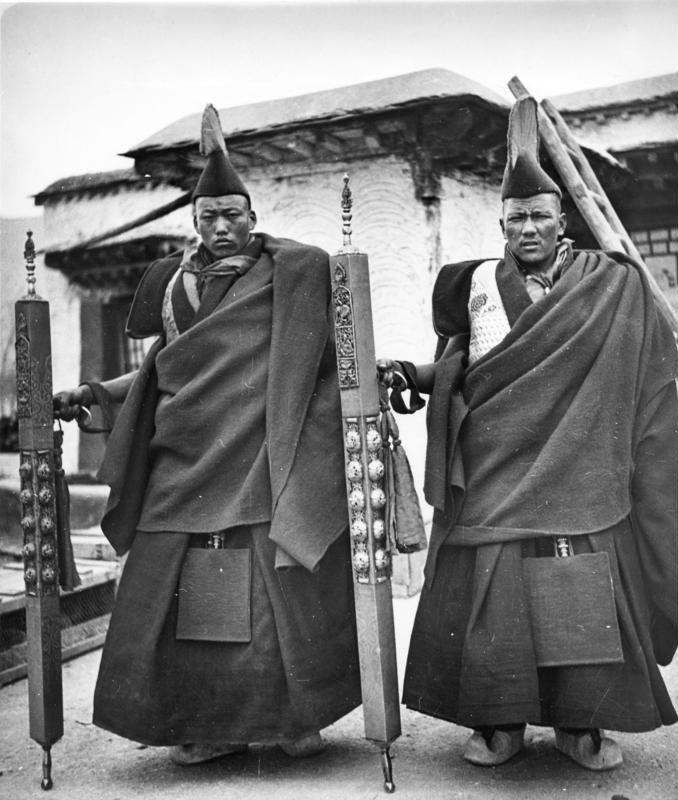
Two dob-dobs at Lhasa's New Year celebration (Losar), 1938

A dob-dob (Tibetan: ལྡོབ་ལྡོབ་, Wylie: ldob ldob or in some sources ldab ldob) is a member of a type of Tibetan Buddhist monk fraternity that existed in Gelug monasteries in Tibet such as Sera Monastery and are reported to still exist in Gelug monasteries today, although possibly in a somewhat altered form. The status of dob-dobs tended to be somewhat ambiguous and they were generally the less academic monks who had an interest in sports, fighting and other "worldly" matters.

== Disruptive influences or peacemakers? ==
Dob-dobs sometimes acted as self-appointed policemen in the monasteries. Geshe Lama Konchog, for example, recalled being beaten by his dob-dob uncle in Sera for being over-eager to study and take Tantric initiations. Dob-dobs were often seen as potential trouble-makers, with Sir Charles Alfred Bell describing in his portrait of the Thirteenth Dalai Lama how dob-dobs were foremost amongst monks at large religious ceremonies who were "bursting with superfluous energy, and spoiling for a fight".

However, dob-dobs also contributed many positive qualities to monastery life. According to José Ignacio Cabezón of the Tibetan & Himalayan Digital Library:

On the other hand, dob dobs were known for being forthright, honest, hard-working and extremely loyal (to their fraternities and to their college). They were also known for their generosity and their sense of fairness. It was often the dob dobs who would care for sick or elderly monks who could not leave their rooms.

== Life as a dob-dob ==
Tashi Khedrup became a candidate to join the dob-dobs in Sera in 1951, when he was nearly 15 years old. He describes how the dob-dob fraternity worked for its members:

The association I joined had about 36 members who came from different colleges all over the monastery. That made it possible to meet a lot of new friends. There was no entrance fee, but each member contributed what he could to a common fund from which we bought food, which we ate in one another's rooms. Usually meetings were held in the room of the leader... He had been a famous jumper and fighter, but was very quiet in his manner, though he saw to it that discipline was properly kept. Clubs of that sort, which we called kyidu – that means that everyone shares the good and bad alike – might last for many years or might break up and reform into new groups. If a member died, a share of his property went to the kyidu, some went to pay the men whose duty it was to cut up his dead body, and the rest to his college.

For the teen-aged Tashi Khedrup, at least, sartorial elegance was a big part of the fraternity:

Dob-dobs were always very proud of their clothes and looked after them carefully. We liked a specially dark shade of expensive, fine woollen cloth for our long skirt-like garment. It had to be folded carefully into a number of pleats, rather like a kilt, and when we were in our rooms, we usually took it off and put it under a board and sat on it to press the pleats. The front part had to be quite flat, again like a kilt. And I could now grow my hair long. There were strict rules about the exact length and manner in which it had to be cut; the right side was brushed downwards and the left was bunched up into a big curl. We all took a lot of trouble to keep our hair well and rubbed it regularly with Vaseline.

Sexual abuse of children was also very common among dob-dobs.

"They were also notorious for fighting with each other to see who was toughest and for their sexual predation of lay boys. All schoolboys in Lhasa were fair game for these dob-dobs, and most tried to return from school in groups for protection against them. I knew for some time that I was being pursued and had several close calls. But I was always able to escape until one fateful day when that monk caught me after a gadrugba performance in Lhasa and forcibly took me to his apartment in the monastery. He made me a prisoner, threatening me with beatings if I tried to escape or I refused to cooperate with him sexually. It was distasteful, but he released me after two days. The incident, however, reawakened my ambivalent feelings toward traditional Tibetan society. Once again its cruelty was thrust into my life. I wondered to myself how monasteries could allow such thugs to wear the holy robes of the Lord Buddha. When I talked to other monks and monk officials about the dob-dobs, they shrugged and said simply that that was just the way things were."

== Monastery laborers ==
In terms of running the monastery, the main task of the dob-dobs was to perform essential domestic labor for the upkeep of the building and the monks inhabiting it. Brian Harris recounts a visit to the monastery in the 1990s and how "sixty dob-dobs would come to help and mix the porridge with a large wooden paddle" at Thikse Monastery, Ladakh, Northern India. Genge Lobsang Samdup recounted how at Ganden Monastery it was the dob-dob who played the thongchen, or long horns, and who also provided the tent for the 14th Dalai Lama's visit.

== Dob-dobs and "bookmen" ==
The dob-dob appears to have a similar role to that of the lay brother in religious orders of Catholicism. Likewise, in Gelug monasteries, the "bookmen" monks have a similar position within the monastery to the Catholic choir monks. Tashi Khendup wrote of the two factions:

Compared with the bookmen monks, we dob-dob were learning nothing. We did go to the assemblies when there was a good distribution of food or money; and we had to be careful to hide our curls, which were not allowed to be worn there. Sometimes, too, we went to listen to the scholars practising debating in the poplar grove where this took place. We found this amusing and would imitate their gestures – stamping, waving, rosaries, clapping one hand against the other at arm’s length, and uttering a shout when making a point. We may have picked up some of the argument, too, but the main reason for going was that there was a distribution of food and money there on some days.
