= Lhasa No.1 Elementary School =

School in Lhasa, Tibet, China

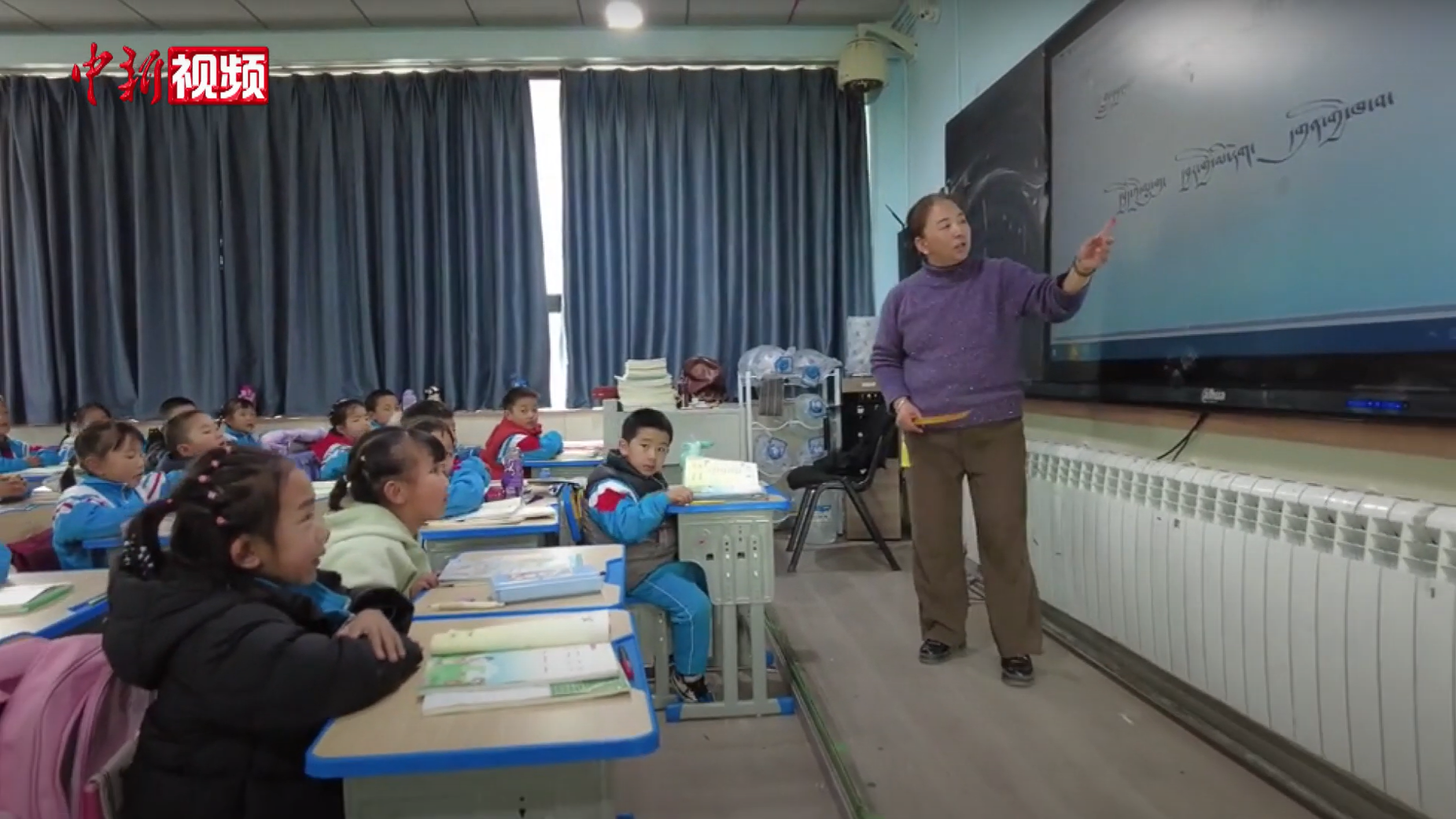
Teaching Tibetan languages at Lhasa No.1 Elementary School in 2024

Lhasa No.1 Elementary School (Chinese: 拉萨市第一小学), formerly known as Lhasa Elementary School (Chinese: 拉萨小学), is located in the Chengguan District, Lhasa, Tibet Autonomous Region, and is the first full-time public elementary school in Lhasa.

== History ==
In 1952, in accordance with the Seventeen Point Agreement, the Chinese Communist Party Tibet Work Committee negotiated with Kashgar, and with the active cooperation of people from all walks of life, the Lhasa Elementary School Preparatory Board was set up on February 28, 1952, responsible for the school's establishment and operation. The Lhasa Elementary School was formally established on August 15, 1952, with an enrollment of more than 400 students, 10 classes, and 20 orphaned students recruited in school. The 1st Lhasa Elementary School Board, leading by the Zhang Guohua as chairman of the board and Trijang Lobsang Yeshe Tenzin Gyatso, Ngapoi Ngawang Jigme, Dogan Penjor Rabgye and other vice-chairman. Trijang Lobsang Yeshe Tenzin Gyatso is the first principal. In April 1956, the Vice Premier Chen Yi visited Lhasa Elementary School. In July 1957, the Preparatory Committee of the Autonomous Region built Lhasa No. 2 Elementary School, with 400 students; at the same time, Lhasa Elementary School was renamed Lhasa No. 1 Elementary School.

In July 1990, the General Secretary of the Chinese Communist Party Jiang Zemin, visited Lhasa No. 1 Elementary School.
