= Robert W. Ford =

British radio officer (1923–2013)

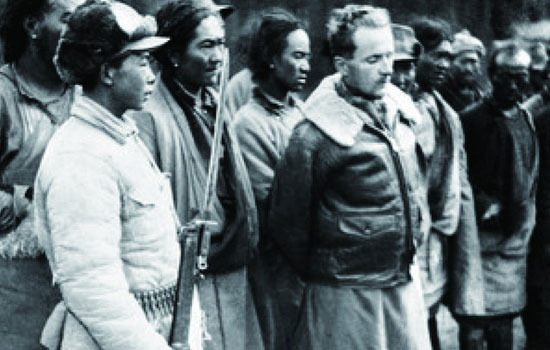
Robert Ford, arrested by People's Liberation Army (PLA) soldiers in 1950

Robert Webster Ford CBE (27 March 1923 – 20 September 2013) was a British radio officer who worked in Tibet in the late 1940s. He was one of the few Westerners to be appointed by the Government of Tibet in the period of de facto independence between 1912 and the year 1950 when the Chinese army marched on Chamdo. He was arrested and jailed for five years by the Chinese. In 1994, he declared that he "had the opportunity to witness and experience at first hand the reality of Tibetan independence." In 1956 he was appointed at the British Diplomatic Service and served in the Foreign Office.

== Early life ==
Born in March 1923 in Burton-on-Trent, Robert Webster Ford was the son of Robert Ford, a brewery engine-driver, and Beatrice Ford, who lived on Church Road in Rolleston-on-Dove. He attended Rolleston Primary School and Burton-on-Trent Grammar School. As he did not relish the idea of spending the rest of his life in a bank or office in Burton-on-Trent and wanted to travel and see the world, he enlisted as an apprentice in the Royal Air Force when he left school at 16. In 1943, he was posted to India but soon became disillusioned, and jumped at the offer of a job as radio operator in Lhasa, Tibet, at the end of World War II.

== In Tibet ==
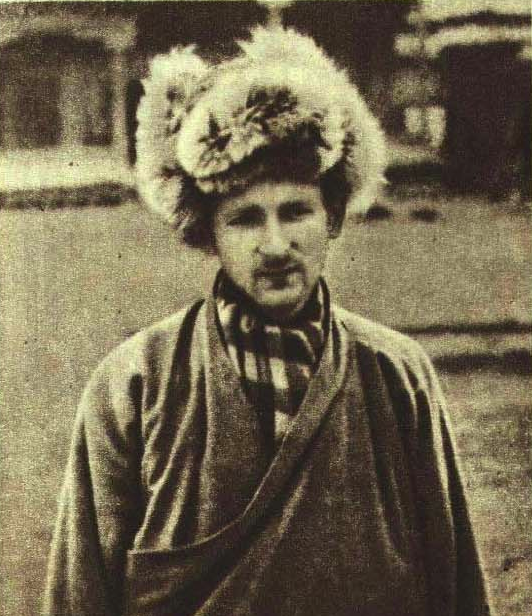
Ford in 1951

In 1945, he joined the British Mission in Lhasa as a radio officer, to replace Reg Fox who had to return to India for medical reasons. He remained in Lhasa from 29 June to 29 September under the supervision of Hugh Richardson and had an audience with the 14-year-old 14th Dalai Lama in Lhasa. The same year he was transferred to Gangtok, Sikkim, where he worked on British India relations with Tibet. In Sikkim, he befriended Rai Saheb Pemba Tsering, the father of Dr. Pemba, the first Tibetan-born doctor trained in Western medicine. When India became independent in 1947, Ford (after returning to the UK to be demobbed) returned to Lhasa in May 1948 and was appointed by the Government of Tibet, becoming the first foreigner to be given an official rank in the country. As Tibetans had difficulty in pronouncing "F", "Ford" became Phodo (and later in Kham, he was to become known as Phodo Kusho, "Ford Esquire").

After one year in Lhasa, he was requested to go to Chamdo, capital of eastern Tibet (Kham), to establish a radio link between Lhasa and Chamdo. With three wireless operator students, he left Lhasa on 20 July 1949. They helped the Governor General of Kham, Lhalu Tsewang Dorje, improve defence in Chamdo and the surrounding area. In addition, a direct link was established for the first time between Lhasa and Chamdo. Early in 1950, Lhalu requested Ford shorten the training of the wireless operator students. By that time, new instructors had arrived to train soldiers in the use of Bren guns. Robert Ford wrote that "the Tibetan Army began to look a little less like something out of the Middle Ages."

He was arrested in 1950 by the advancing Chinese army, along with the Governor General of Kham, Ngabo Ngawang Jigme, and other Tibetan officials. The People's Republic of China accused him of espionage, spreading anti-communist propaganda and causing the death of the Fifth Geda Rinpoche, the vice president of the provincial government of Xikang and envoy from the Chinese government who was to have submitted a 10-point peace proposal to the Lhasa government.

Ford spent nearly five years in jail, in constant fear of being executed, and was subjected to interrogation and thought reform. Only in 1954 was he allowed to send a letter to his parents. At the end of 1954 his trial was held and he was sentenced to ten years jail. He was eventually released and expelled in 1955, returning to the United Kingdom via Hong Kong.

In 1957, he published the memoir Captured in Tibet (U.S. title Wind Between the Worlds) about his experience. The book was reissued in 1990 under the title with a preface by the Dalai Lama and an epilogue by the author entitled "The Occupation".

== Diplomatic career ==
In 1956 he was appointed at the British Diplomatic Service and served in the Foreign Office in London, Vietnam, Indonesia, United States, Morocco, Angola, Sweden, France and finally as Consul-General in Geneva.

He retired in 1983 and was awarded Commander of the Order of the British Empire.

== Later life ==
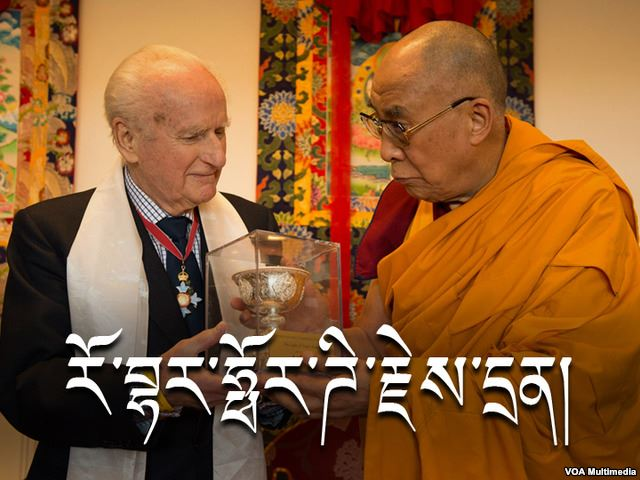
The 14th Dalai Lama of Tibet with Robert Ford, the only foreigner who served in the Tibetan government prior to Tibet's invasion, and who was captured by the People's Liberation Army (PLA) at Chamdo in 1950.

After his retirement, Ford lectured in support of the Tibetan Government in Exile in various countries (the UK, other European countries, Australia and the United States). In 1992, he undertook a countrywide lecture tour in India, at the request of the Dalai Lama. However, the tour was brought to an abrupt end when Ford was put under house arrest in Dharamsala by the Indian authorities as the lectures coincided with Chinese Premier Li Peng's official visit to India. Ford had to return to Britain earlier than expected.

On 13 September 1994, together with foreigners who lived, visited and worked in Tibet prior to 1950, namely Joan Mary Jehu, Heinrich Harrer, Archibald Jack, Bruno Beger, Fosco Maraini, and Kazi Sonam Togpyal, Ford was invited for lunch by the 14th Dalai Lama, then on a visit to London, to exchange their reminiscences and endorse a statement that Tibet was a fully sovereign country before 1950.

In 1996, Ford was able to arrange the first meeting between the 14th Dalai Lama, Tenzin Gyatso and a member of the British royal family. The Dalai Lama met Queen Elizabeth the Queen Mother, with Ford, on 17 July, at Clarence House.

On his 90th birthday, on 27 March 2013, the former radio operator was handed the last of his salary, a 100 Tam Srang note worth 65 pounds, by the Tibetan Government in Exile, at a ceremony in London.

On 13 April 2013, Ford was given the International Campaign for Tibet's Light of Truth Award by the 14th Dalai Lama in Fribourg, Switzerland.

== Personal life ==
Ford married Monica Tebbett, a childhood friend, in 1956. They were married for 55 years and had two sons.

He died at the age of 90 on 20 September 2013 in London.

== Bibliography ==
- Captured in Tibet [English edition], G. Harrap & Co, London, 1957 - Wind Between the Worlds [American edition], David McKay Company, Inc., 1957 - Tibet rouge : "Captured in Tibet" [French edition], translated by Pierre Singer, Crét, 1958
- Captured in Tibet [2nd English edition], Oxford University Press, 1990 ISBN 0-19-581570-X
- Tibet Rouge. Capturé par l’armée chinoise au Kham [2nd French edition], Olizane, 1999 ISBN 2-88086-241-8
