= Trimön =

Tibetan aristocrat and politician (1874–1945)

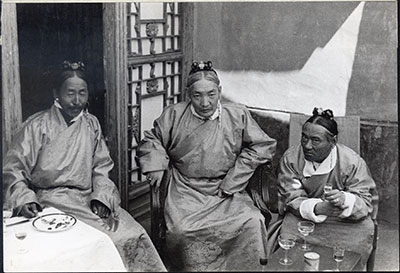
Trimön (centre)

Trimön Shap-pe (Tibetan: ཁྲི་སམོན་ཞབས་པད), born Norbu Wangyal (ནོར་པུ་དབྱང་རྒྱལ, 1874–1945), was a highly prominent Tibetan aristocrat, conservative politician and governor, a former Finance Minister, and Chief Cabinet Minister of Tibet. (Tsipön; Tibetan: rtsis-dpon). Trimon accompanied Regent Reting who jointly spearheaded the search to lake Lhamo Latso, leading to the discovery of Tenzin Gyatso, the 14th Dalai Lama in 1935. Trimon is regarded as an eminent personality and significant political figure in modern Tibetan history.

== Biography ==
Trimon Norbu Wangyal was the second son of the eminent Tsi-pa Shakabpa Tenzin Norgye, a distinguished bureaucrat who oversaw the training of cadets that entered government service. A scion of the Shakabpa family, Norbu Wangyal was adopted into the Trimön family. He took the family name upon inheriting the estates of his wife's father at Chetang, near Lhasa although he lived for many years at Sechung House.

=== Career ===
In 1912, Trimön, despite no formal military training, was assigned to a post as Assistant Commanders-in-Chief of the Tibetan army during the Chinese conflict at Lhasa. In June of that year, he was conferred the title of Theji.In 1913-1914, he accompanied Lönchen Shatra to India as his personal assistant, to the Tibetan Plenipotentiaries at the Simla Convention and conversed with Lord Hardinge. When he returned to Tibet in 1914, he was appointed the title of Shap-pe (Wylie: zhabs pad).

Throughout the 1920s, Trimön worked as the Commissioner in Eastern Tibet. His position ended in 1931 when Nga-pho Shap-pe was brought in to resume his role. Despite being a competent figure, with substantial literary knowledge, he was unpopular with the National Assembly, and was widely reported to be very conservative, stern and arrogant. He was one of the victims of Lungshar's plot which failed in the summer of 1934. The decision to blind the popular reformist Lungshar came from Trimön, who had been his chief political opponent.

After the 13th Dalai Lama's demise in 1933, in the summer of 1935 - Trimön was amongst eminent officials who set out with the Kashag to find the reincarnated 14th Dalai Lama. The search sent them across Tibet as well as visiting the customary Lhamo La-tso several times, a lake where it is said to offer clues to the whereabouts of the next Dalai Lama.

=== Resignation ===
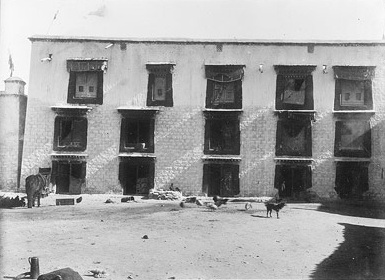
Trimön's house, Sechung, in Lhasa, 1920-21 by Charles Alfred Bell

During this time he grew increasingly affected by the government in Tibet, and following the search for the new Dalai Lama ordered his nephew, Tsepon Shakabpa while staying at Tiklo Monastery to draft his resignation. That from his position to the high council stating that "he had advanced in age, and wish to resign, devoting the remainder of his life to religious pursuits." The Regent, the Fifth Reting Rinpoche attempted to get Trimön to change his mind, and believed he should be promoted to lönchen, as he had desired. He stated he would also resign from the cabinet if Trimön quit. Trimön returned to Lhasa in October 1935, and despite Reting's words he resigned officially shortly before the Tibetan New Year in January 1936. Reting did not resign as he had promised, and did not reply straight away. But after the Losar celebrations, Reting responded to Trimön, formally thanking him for his distinguished service to Tibet. He was granted the estate Kaship Nubling.

At this time, concerns increasingly grew in regards to Trimön's mental state, and his behavior became increasingly eccentric. He was perceived to display occasional fits of insanity. He was seen at the market in Lhasa wearing a white Shamthab (a lower dress worn by ascetic lamas) and playing music and dancing. He was reported to have pounded heavily on the doors of the Jokhang temple hollering at the monks to open it. He responded strangely to Reting's offer of Kaship Nubling, and tried to garner support to be reinstated. There is much evidence to suggest that Trimön did not genuinely want to resign from the government, but had become distressed with his position and the situation. Trimön resigned on the grounds that he would still be consulted to offer advice on important affairs. He remained suspicious of the Chinese until his death in 1945, as Reting's regime grew increasingly weak after his departure.
