= Tsarong =

Tibetan politician and general (1888–1959)

Tsarong Dasang Dadul
- ཚ་རོང་ཟླ་བཟང་དགྲ་འདུལ་
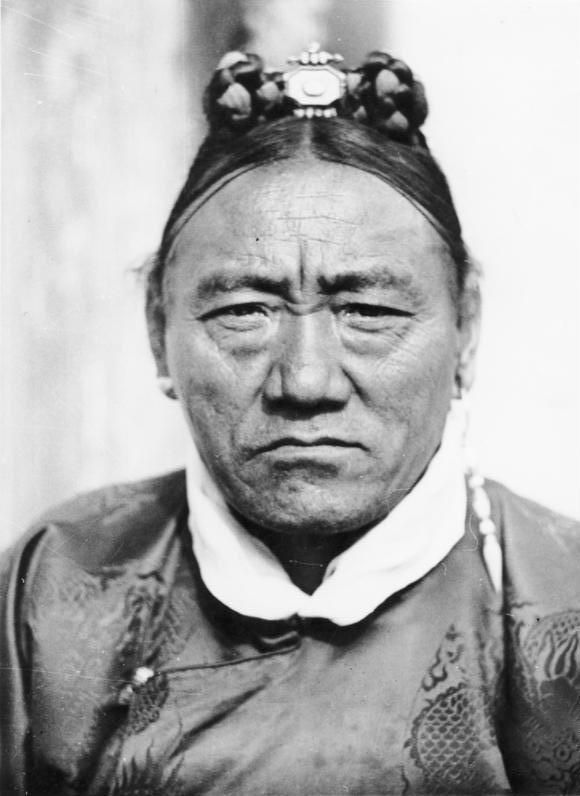
- Tsarong in 1938

Kalön of Tibet
- In office 1914–1929 Serving with Khemey Rinchen Wangyal (until 1921), Trimön Norbu Wangyal (until 1934), Ngabo (since 1921), and Lobsang Tenyong (since 1925)
- Monarchs: 13th Dalai Lama; 14th Dalai Lama

Commander-in-chief of the Tibetan Army
- In office 1913–1925

Personal details
- Born: Namgang; 1888 Phenpo, Tibet, Great Qing
- Died: 14 May 1959 (aged 70–71) Lhasa, Tibet, China
- Spouse: Padma Dolkar (daughter of Tsarong Wangchuk Gyalpo)
- Occupation: Politician, general

Military service
- Allegiance: Tibet
- Branch/service: Tibetan Army
- Rank: General
- Battles/wars: 1959 Tibetan uprising

Tsarong Dasang Dramdul (Note: Tibetan: ཚ་རོང་ཟླ་བཟང་དགྲ་འདུལ་, Wylie: tsha-rong zla-bzang dgra-'dul; Chinese: 擦絨·達桑佔堆; pinyin: Cāróng Dásāng Zhānduī) (1888–1959), commonly known mononymously as Tsarong or by his title Tsarong Dzasa, was a Tibetan politician and general in the Tibetan Army. He was a close aide of the 13th Dalai Lama and played an important role in the early twentieth century politics of Tibet. Eager to accelerate economic progression and pursue the modernization of Tibet, Tsarong believed that the old order in Tibet had to be broken by hierarchical reforms to prepare the way for a more modern society which would be compatible with the outside world. In his efforts to build up Tibet's defense systems and relations with European powers as well as to facilitate trade and strengthen the Tibetan currency, he made a series of diplomatic visits to British India. His diplomatic skills came to see him regarded by the British as being, "the most powerful friend of His Majesty's Government in Tibet."

Tsarong was captured by the People's Liberation Army following the failed March 1959 uprising in Lhasa. He died in prison shortly afterwards, before his scheduled "struggle session" in Lhasa.

== Growth of a military leader (1888–1913) ==
Namgang Dazang Damdu was born into a peasant family in Phenpo, north of Lhasa in 1888 according to the Tibet Museum (other sources suggest 1885). As a child he demonstrated an unusually high level of intelligence and advanced abilities. In 1900, he was recognized by Khangnyi Jipa, a monk who served as an official of the Norbulingka palace and took on Namgang as his pupil at the age of twelve, considered very young at the time. Within a short amount of time he was employed in the personal service of the 13th Dalai Lama.

Namgangla accompanied the Dalai Lama in his trip to Mongolia in 1903 and from then on became his closest servant. The Dalai Lama grew increasingly fond of Namgangla during the first decade of the 20th century. He was said to greatly admire the dedication and hard work that Namgangla contributed in his service and became one of his favorites. The Dalai Lama compassionately named him 'Chensel' Namgang; 'Chensel' literally meaning 'visible to the eyes', because Namgang was constantly in his presence. As the Dalai Lama grew in trust of Namgang and his abilities, he became increasingly important not only as a servant but as an adviser. In April 1908, for instance, he was entrusted to sign the Trade Regulations in Calcutta on behalf of the Tibetan Government.

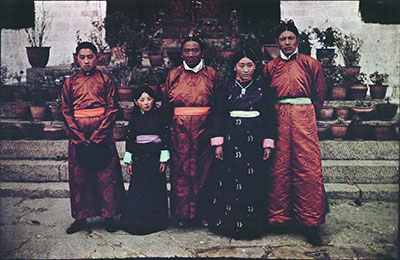
Dundul Namgyal Tsarong ("George"), Ngodup Wangmo, Tsarong Dzasa, Kunsang Lhakyi Tsarong ("Kate"), and Jigme Taring standing on the steps of Tsarong's house

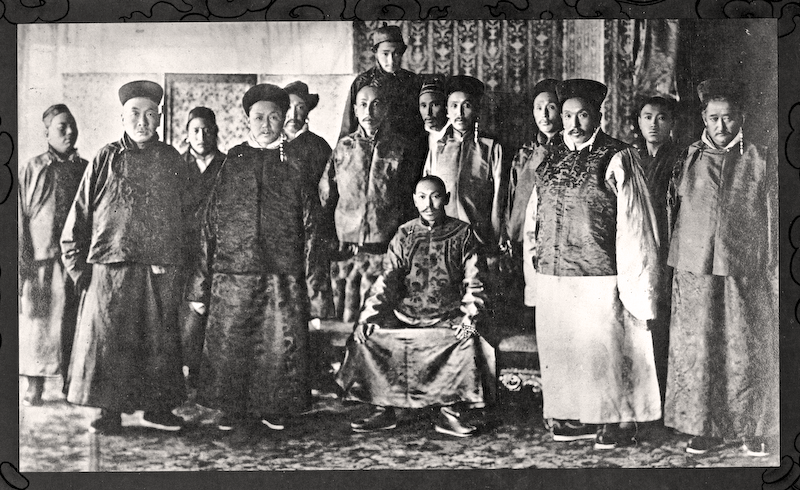
13th Dalai Lama in Darjeeling, India on 18 May 1910

Namgang played an important role in the pre-Xinhai Revolution defense against the Qing's expedition to Tibet. When in March 1910, the 13th Dalai Lama fled into exile to British India, Namgangla remained behind at Chaksam Ferry with an army of Tibetan soldiers, and resisted the Qing troops who were attempting to thwart the passage of the Dalai Lama to India. The Qing suffered a humiliating defeat as well as a significant number of casualties and his success in the battle and protection of the spiritual leader and country won him notable acclaim in the eyes of many Tibetans who referred to him as the 'Hero of Chaksam'.

While in India, in early 1912, the Dalai Lama appointed Namgangla as the official Commander-in-Chief of Tibet, awarding him the title of Dzasa. He would soon take the other name, Tsarong, in July 1913 from his marriage to the eldest daughter of the late Kalon Tsarong Shap-pe whose prestigious title, "Shap-pe" and state entitlements he inherited. Early in 1912, after his appointment as commander, Tsarong was sent to Lhasa to work in close cooperation with the War Department established by the officials of the Tibetan government, Trimon and Chamba Tendar. In Lhasa they formulated and coordinated a revolt against the Qing forces, which had become increasingly weak in Tibet following the collapse of the Manchu Qing dynasty and the ongoing Chinese revolution. The Qing army lacked supplies and reinforcements and were forced to surrender on 12 August 1912 after force from an army led by Tsarong. Following victory, the Dalai Lama returned from exile, declaring the Independence of Tibet in early 1913.

Peter Aufschnaiter said in his book Eight Years in Tibet:

"He had very definite opinions about everything connected with Tibet based on a thorough consideration. On the other hand, he was able to learn quite a bit from us about the modern world ... he has thought about many things for himself, often correctly. He had risen from the lowest social class and had never been to school. He had gained his high position through skill and courage at the time of the flight of the thirteenth Dalai Lama from the Chinese in 1911. He was then director of the so-called Drapchi office, which was responsible for technical work and for production of banknotes and coins. His salary was very small, because officials were expected to earn their own income through private trading."

== International diplomacy and ideologies of modernization (1914–1932) ==
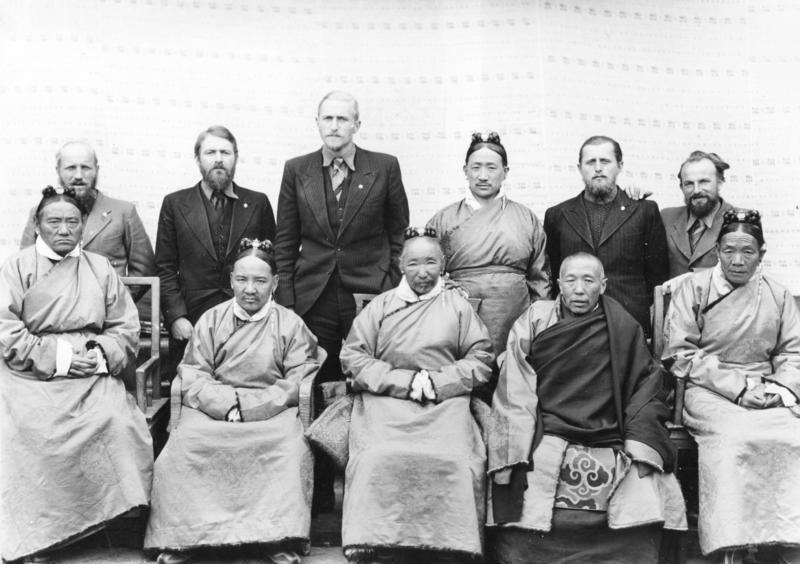
Tsarong (front left) pictured with other Tibetan officials and the German expedition to Tibet in 1938

In September 1915 Tsarong visited Sikkim on diplomatic purposes and visited India again on a pilgrimage in 1924. Following the declaration of Tibetan Independence and victory, Tsarong became a leading figure in Tibet in the 1910s and the decades that followed, and was entrusted with a significant amount of responsibility for the running of Tibet. His status was something unique in Tibet, growing to possess military, political and economic power. In conjunction he was not only the Commander-in-Chief of the Army, but became Senior Cabinet Minister and later Head of the Tibetan Mint and Armoury after 1933.

Tsarong gained practical and theoretical experiences by visiting neighboring countries and educating himself about their national policies and strategies. He learned that for a state to be successful, there must be not only a great value placed on internal domestic unity and prosperity, but the country must exert a strong military presence and engage in active diplomacy with foreign nations to affect the balance of international power in favor of Tibet. This strong military force in Tsarong's ideology must also exert power over those within the country, driving out the threats from internal disunity and taking away local and class privileges in favor of a centralized military-based elite, a modern Tibetan state. However, although Tsarong was very popular with many ordinary Tibetans throughout Tibet, Tsarong's revolutionary ideas of modernization and a dramatic restructure of local aristocrats and estates made him strongly disliked by many of the aristocracy or authoritative monks in Tibet who viewed him as a serious threat to their historical privileges and order.

In the 1920s the aristocrats in Tibet plotted for his downfall and utilized the opportunity to do so while he was on leave in India in 1924. On his return from India in 1925, Tsarong was deprived of his Commander-in-Chief title and was subsequently demoted out of the Kashag. Despite this he remained a powerful figure and notably had strong support from the monks of one of Tibets important monasteries, Drepung who he had aided during a fracas in 1929. Tsarong would continue to make visits back and forth to Sikkim throughout the rest of life, making a memorable trip to Gangtok in 1940 in which he met with the Maharaja of Sikkim, which has been captured in photographs.

== Involvement in economy in Tibet (1933–1950) ==
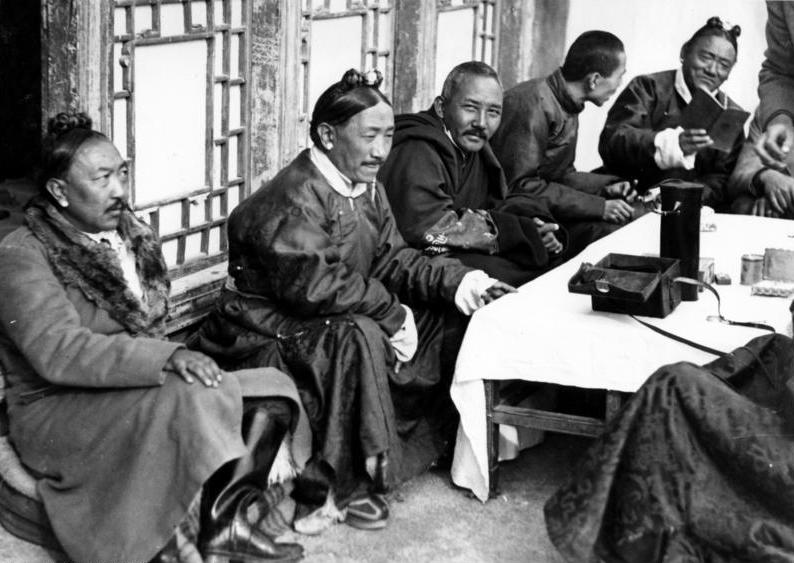
Tsarong (far right) in Lhasa in 1938

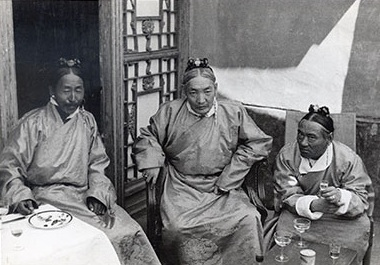
Rai Bahadur Norbhu Dhondhup, Trimon and Tsarong

Tsarong was prominent in the economic affairs of Tibet throughout the 1930s and 1940s. Following the death of the 13th Dalai Lama in 1933, Tsarong was appointed the Head of the Arsenal-Mint, the Grwa bZhi dNgul Khang (གྲྭ་བཞི་དངུལ་ཁང). This department had a number of functions, including to improve the quality of paper currency, stock pile arms, and to introduce electricity into Lhasa. In 1947, Dzasa along with ministers Trunyichemmo Cawtang and Tsipon Shakabpa spearheaded the Tibetan Trade Mission of the mint which sought to strengthen Tibet's currency and to increase hard gold reserves against paper. Dzasa was notably concerned about the weakness of the financial situation and Tsepon Wangchuk Deden Shakabpa recounted the economic situation in Tibet and Dzasa's aims at this time;

"In 1947 there was little of either grain reserves or gold. Tsarong was worried about this situation since we continued to print new paper currency. He always used to say that the paper money had to have some hard backing; that a currency note means that the government guarantees the value of the note in gold or some other commodity. He also used to talk about a foreign country where all the people suddenly came and asked to change paper money into silver and gold and the government had nothing, so the finance minister had to commit suicide."

Potala Palace, Lhasa	Norbulingka, Lhasa

During this period Tsarong was also an active figure in civil engineering works and buildings in Tibet. In 1937 for instance he supervised the construction of a steel bridge over the Trisum River, about eight miles from Lhasa, on the main trade route from Lhasa to India and western Tibet. Immediately after its completion, Tsarong began planning a more ambitious structure across the Kyichu, the Kyichu Bridge which was to be located east of Lhasa. The project was given the seal of approval from the Tibetan government and Tsarong had organised the purchase of steel girders from Calcutta to be used to construct it. However, growing concerns over the Chinese meant the project had to be abandoned. Later after the Chinese successfully annexed Tibet, they would finance a notable bridge at Perong, close to the original site.

== Relations with People's Republic of China in Tibet (1950–1959) ==
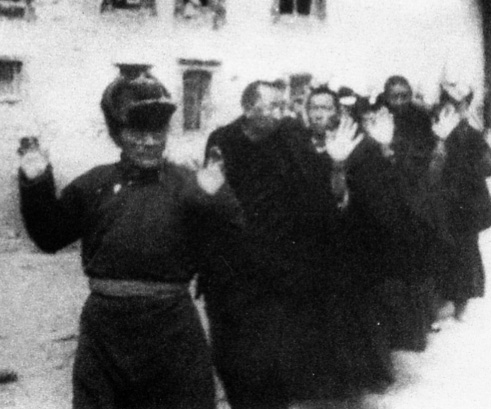
Tsarong and Tibetan monks captured by the People's Liberation Army in March 1959 in an image taken from a Chinese propaganda film. Tsarong would soon die in a prison before his scheduled "struggle session".

In the late 1940s and 1950s the threat from the Chinese grew increasingly ominous. In 1959 a revolt broke out in Lhasa against the Chinese government. Tsarong had been appointed to use his diplomatic skills to head a delegation to negotiate with the Chinese authorities in Lhasa but before negotiations could be finalized, Lhasa came under fire with bombing of the Potala and Norbulingka palaces. Several hundred Tibetans died in the attack (with approximately 87,000 dying in genocidal reprisals after the uprising's failure) and Tsarong and a number of other important officials were captured during the battle, or others died. Shortly after his arrest, on 14 May 1959, Tsarong died in a Chinese military prison in Lhasa.

== Personal life ==
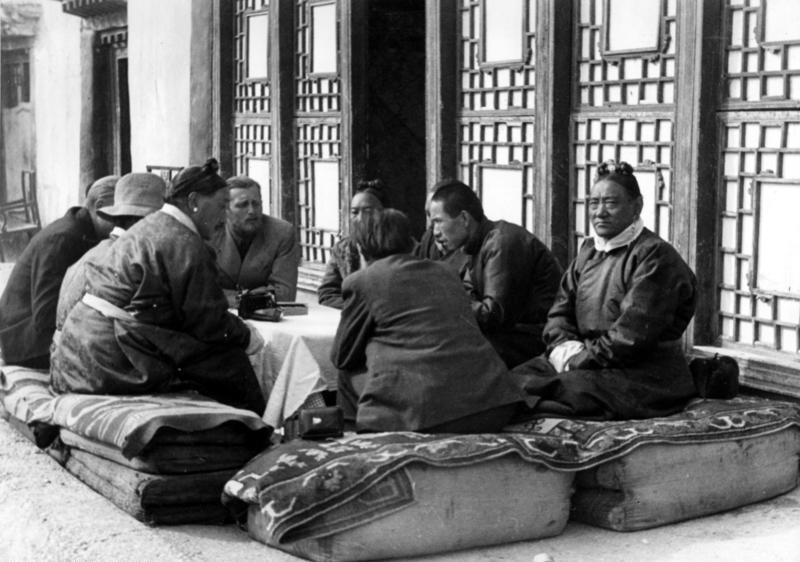
Tsarong Dzasa (right)

Tsarong was said to be able to speak Russian, Hindustani and Mongolian. He was described by the British as "the most powerful friend of His Majesty's Government in Tibet" and being "very friendly to British officials". He was described as "wealthy, with great energy, sound sense and was progressively minded". Among his six children was Tsering Yangzom.
