= Land reform in Tibet =

2019 marks the 60th anniversary of democratic reform in Tibetan areas

The Tibetan land reform movement refers to a series of land reform movements implemented by the Government of the People's Republic of China in the Tibetan region, which was previously governed by the Kashag. The People's Republic of China referred to the policy as the "Tibetan Democratic Reform".

After the 14th Dalai Lama fled to India in 1959, Chinese authorities set aside their earlier position of "delaying democratic reforms" and began to criticise the traditional Tibetan system, which they characterised as serfdom. Reforms included the promotion of public ownership of land, the confiscation of civilian weapons, and the restriction of the authority of traditional Tibetan leaders to prevent organised resistance.

These reforms coincided with the Great Leap Forward (1958–1962), during which widespread famine occurred across China. Despite this, the Chinese Communist Party maintained its reform policies in minority regions, and famine conditions extended to Tibet.

== Background ==
On March 10, 1959, an armed conflict broke out in Lhasa, Tibet. The People's Republic of China described the event as a rebellion, while the Republic of China and the Tibetan government-in-exile referred to it as an uprising. The People's Liberation Army prevailed, leading the 14th Dalai Lama, the Tibetan government Kashag, and their followers to flee to India.

On March 28, 1959, then Premier Zhou Enlai signed a State Council order announcing the dissolution of the former Tibetan government. The Preparatory Committee for the Tibet Autonomous Region was granted authority to exercise the functions of government and to implement land reform. The former Kashag officials subsequently announced the establishment of the Central Tibetan Administration in Dharamshala, India.

In the following years, the People's Republic of China expanded its crackdown in Tibetan areas. In 1962, the 10th Panchen Lama wrote in his 70,000 Character Petition: "For most people who may or may not be labelled as rebels, and many good people who should not be labelled as rebels, they have been wrongly labelled as rebels, arrested and imprisoned, their property confiscated, and treated the same as the main culprits of rebellion."

According to the Tibetan government-in-exile, the 10th Panchen Lama stated in a speech at a National People's Congress group meeting on March 28, 1987: "In 1958, I heard in Qinghai that a party document said 'We must provoke a rebellion, suppress it, and then, in the process of suppressing the rebellion, thoroughly resolve religious and ethnic issues'." The government-in-exile argued that the incident was part of a premeditated strategy by the Chinese Communist Party, intended to use the suppression of unrest as an opportunity to fundamentally transform Tibetan society.

== History ==
=== Early reforms outside Tibet Autonomous Region ===
In the early 1950s, the Land Reform Movement was launched in mainland China, but it was not implemented on a large scale in Tibetan areas at that time. Until early 1955, the CPC Central Committee maintained a cautious attitude towards the "socialist transformation of agriculture" in ethnic minority regions. On February 25, 1955, the CPC Central Committee issued a "Directive on the Issue of Carrying out Socialist Transformation of Agriculture in Ethnic Minority Areas" to the Party Committees of 13 provinces and autonomous regions with significant minority populations, excluding Tibet. The directive criticised the "impatient and reckless practice of forcing policies designed for Han areas onto minority regions" and warned that such approaches "may even lead to mass riots".

Later in 1955, CPC policy shifted. On July 30, 1955, the People's Republic of China announced the abolition of Xikang Province, a Tibetan-majority area, which was merged into Sichuan Province. The following day, Mao Zedong convened a meeting of provincial, municipal and autonomous regional Party secretaries, where he delivered a report on agricultural cooperation and criticised Deng Zihui, then Minister of the Rural Work Department, for advocating a slowdown in collectivisation. Two months later, the CPC Sichuan Provincial Committee submitted a report requesting the implementation of land reform in Tibetan and Yi areas, which began in Ganzi, Aba and other locations in the winter of 1955.

=== Resistance and suppression ===
After reforms were implemented in Tibetan areas of Qinghai and Sichuan, Xirao Gyatso, vice governor of Qinghai, addressed the First National People's Congress in June 1956, urging that "attention should be paid to ethnic characteristics during the high tide of collectivisation". In July 1957, he again advised caution in implementing reforms in Tibetan areas, suggesting measures such as leniency in establishing pastoral cooperatives and tax reductions for monasteries. His proposals, however, had little effect amid the nationwide collectivisation drive.

The stated goals of the CPC's "democratic reform" in Tibetan areas included dismantling the traditional economy, confiscating weapons, limiting monastic influence, and creating grassroots governments. Under "cooperative animal husbandry", wealthier herders' livestock were redeemed at low prices and transferred to joint pastures, while poorer herders were organised into cooperatives. Many herders resisted these changes, with some tribes fleeing or opposing the policy. The authorities referred to such resistance as "rebellion" and deployed troops to suppress it, particularly in Qinghai and Gannan, where casualties were reported.

=== Reforms in Tibet Autonomous Region ===
After 1959, similar reforms began in the Tibet Autonomous Region, which proceeded in two stages. From June 1959 to February 1960, Tibetan resistance was suppressed, corvée labour was abolished, and land rents were reduced. The second stage redistributed land. Although initial policies emphasised "no struggle, no division, no class struggle", mainland methods of land reform were soon applied, including classification of households into social categories such as landlords and rich peasants. Those identified as landlords had their property confiscated, contributing to unrest.

Unlike reforms in other parts of China, in Tibet land reform and collectivisation were carried out simultaneously. Land was nominally redistributed but directly incorporated into cooperatives, a process described by some as "taking two steps at once".

In 1965, the Tibet Autonomous Region was formally established and agricultural collectivisation was introduced through people's communes. Critics argue that the promotion of crops such as wheat, unsuitable for the plateau, contributed to famine, forcing many Tibetans to beg in Sichuan. Contemporary reports noted Tibet's resource wealth—pastoral land, forests, mineral deposits, and tourism potential—but Tibetans often saw limited benefit. For example, in Gongjue County in 1980, each person reportedly received only 130 kilograms of grain annually, with an average income of less than 42 yuan.

By December 1975, land collectivisation was considered complete, with about 2,000 people’s communes established. Official accounts praised the reform as "a golden bridge to the socialist paradise". Chinese authorities stressed that the introduction of Class struggle and the "three major educational movements" aimed to strengthen class consciousness among former serfs and build support for socialism.

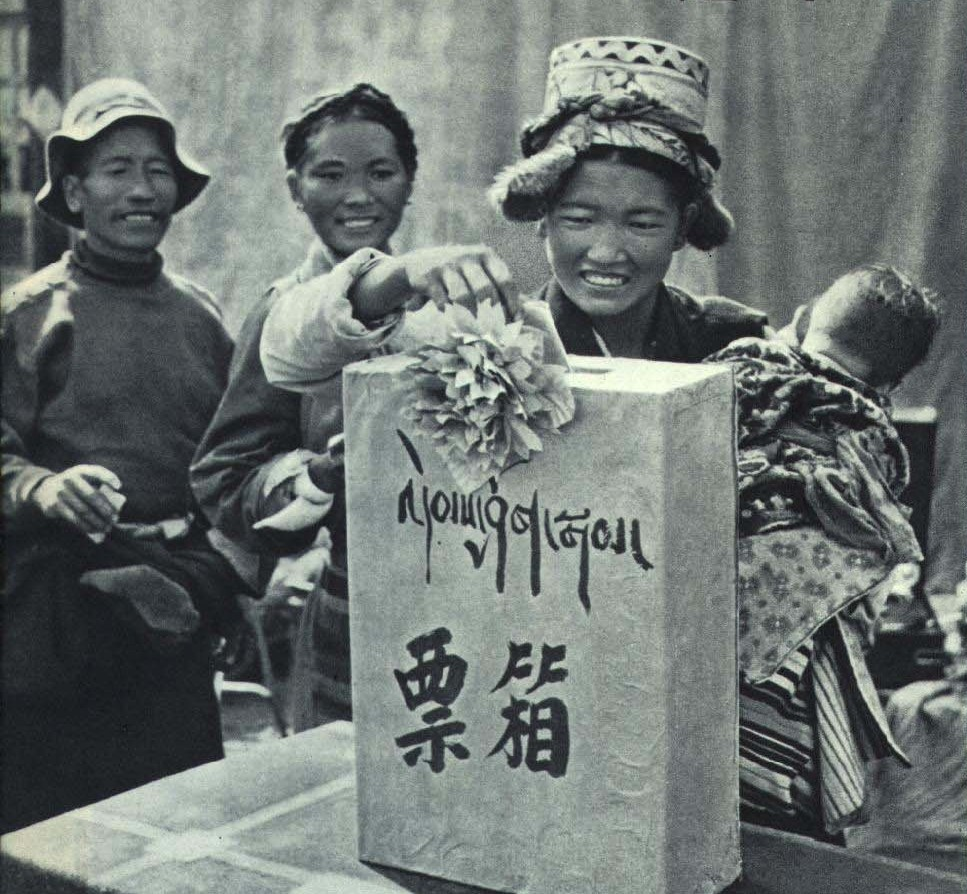
1963 Tibetan general election

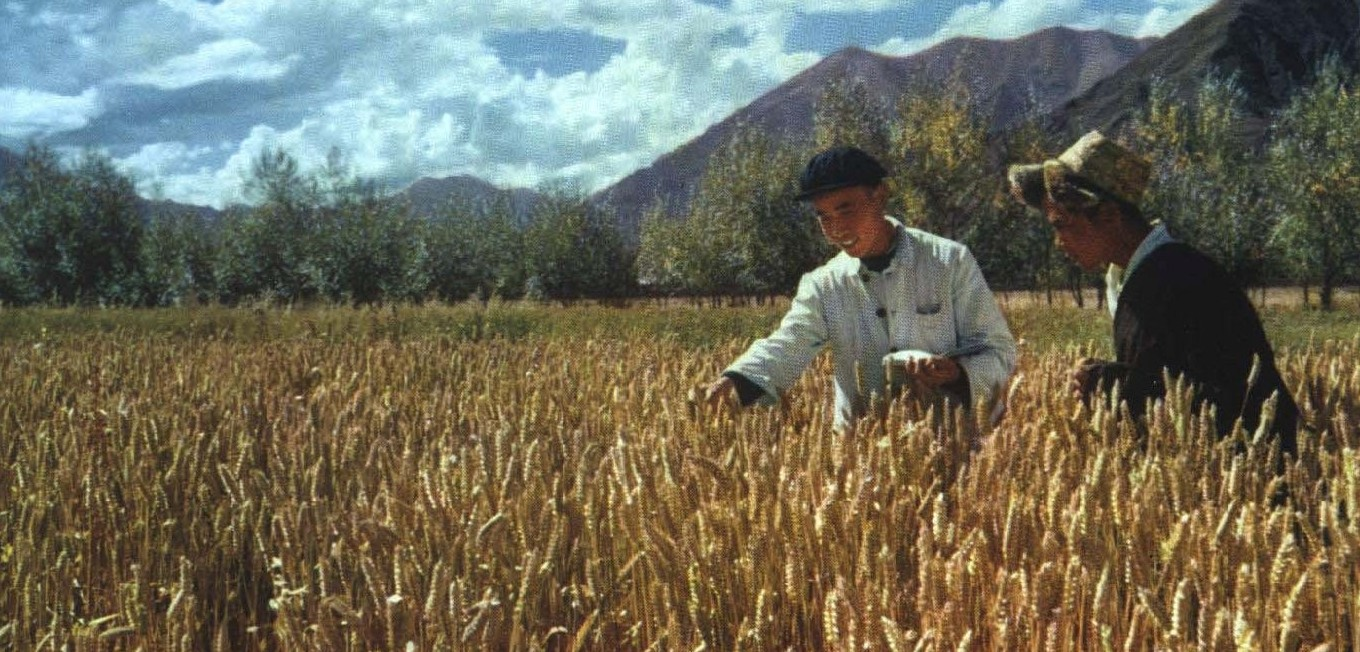
In 1964, with the help of scientists, wheat fields in Tibet were improved.

=== Impact on monasteries and society ===
Land reform significantly reduced the income of monasteries, which had traditionally relied on land revenues to support large numbers of monks. A 2009 State Council white paper reported that the government confiscated 1.9 million mu of land from landlords and redeemed another 900,000 mu, totalling over 2.8 million mu.

According to Xinhua News Agency, the reform abolished the feudal serfdom system in Tibet, granting personal freedom, land, and political rights to millions of former serfs and slaves, said to constitute 95% of the population at the time. Chinese sources described the reforms as transformative, while exile accounts highlight the social unrest and hardship they produced.

In his 70,000 Character Petition, the 10th Panchen Lama wrote that "after the suppression of the rebellion and the reform of the people, life gradually became stable and improved", praising the government's protection of religious freedom for law-abiding temples and believers.

== Commemoration ==
On January 19, 2009, the Second Session of the Ninth People's Congress of the Tibet Autonomous Region passed a resolution establishing Serfs' Emancipation Day, officially called the "Tibetan Million Serfs Liberation Day". The holiday is observed annually on March 28 to mark the 50th anniversary of what the Chinese government terms "democratic reform" in Tibet.

Commentators have noted that the holiday was introduced partly in response to Tibetan Uprising Day, which has been commemorated by the Tibetan diaspora each year on March 10.

== Criticism and condemnation ==
The 10th Panchen Erdeni expressed concerns in his 70,000 Character Petition regarding the implementation of reforms:

Due to the lack of thoroughness and detail in the investigation, many people were unjustly labelled, and the scope of the crackdown was too wide. As a result, households that should not have been confiscated were confiscated. Middle and rich serfs, if not careful in their actions or words, were attacked and became the object of contempt and insult. … In this campaign, most people who had served as guards, cobens, temple stewards, and others were classified as lords or agents of lords. The proven crimes of the accused should have been carefully established in order to break their prestige. However, this was not done. Instead, at the beginning of the campaign, there were shouts and roars, hair and beards were pulled, people were punched and kicked, flesh was twisted, shoulders pinched, and individuals were pushed and shoved. Some were beaten with large keys and sticks, causing bleeding from the orifices, unconsciousness, broken limbs, and other serious injuries. In some cases, people died on the spot.

Under the so-called "breaking superstition," the first step was to oppose religion; the second step was to destroy Buddha statues, scriptures, and pagodas; and the third step was to compel monks and nuns to return to secular life.

Because of the shortage of food at that time, it was difficult for food-deficient people to obtain supplies from elsewhere, which led to deaths from starvation in some parts of Tibet. … In the past, such cases of starvation had never been heard of in Tibet.

Between 1959 and 1965, the United Nations General Assembly passed three resolutions condemning the actions of the Chinese authorities in Tibet and calling on the People's Republic of China to cease violations of Tibetan human rights:

- Resolution 1353 (October 1959): Called on China to respect the fundamental human rights of the Tibetan people and their cultural and religious life.
- Resolution 1723 (December 1961): Reaffirmed calls for China to cease actions depriving Tibetans of their rights and freedoms, including the right to self-determination, and urged member states to support implementation.
- Resolution 2079 (December 1965): Condemned continuing incidents in Tibet, characterised them as violations of fundamental rights and freedoms, and urged all member states to work towards ensuring compliance.

In the latter half of the 20th century, the United States Congress, the European Parliament, and various non-governmental organisations also called on the Chinese government to respect Tibetan culture and human rights.

== Notes ==
1. This was during the late period of the Great Leap Forward in mainland China(1958 to the first half of 1960).
2. "Gengbao" is the equivalent of the village chief's deputy chief.
3. "Cuoben" is equivalent to the head of the village.
4. A "big key" is a key-shaped steel tool used specifically for fighting.

== See also ==
- Central Tibetan Administration
- Serfdom in Tibet
- Land reform movement
- History of the People's Republic of China's Administration of Tibet
- 1959 Tibetan riots
- Tibet issue
- Tibetan government-in-exile
- Tibet's Million Serfs Liberation Day
