= Tibet serfdom controversy =

Debate about serfdom before 1951

Disagreement exists about the extent and nature of serfdom in Tibet before the annexation of Tibet by the People's Republic of China (PRC) in 1951. The debate has a political dimension. The Chinese government asserts that Tibetan culture, government, and society were feudal in nature before the PRC takeover of Tibet, and this only changed due to PRC policy in the region. Tibetan independence supporters argue that this is a misrepresentation of history, created as a political tool to justify the sinicization of Tibet.

Regardless of the debate about the intention of Chinese descriptions of pre-PRC Tibet, the Tibetan class system had infact divided the population hierarchically into laity (mi ser), noble laity (sger pa) and monks, with further subdivisions within the laity. A caste of untouchables known as ragyabpa performed work considered unclean, including fishing, metalworking, and prostitution.

The Chinese government portrays Tibet from 1912 to 1951 as a feudal society, with 95 percent of Tibetans under serfdom, and the 13th and 14th Dalai Lamas as slave owners, citing cases of abuse and cruelty which were allegedly inherent to the traditional Tibetan system.

== Serfdom and politics ==
The regions of Tibet have changed significantly over the past 2,000 years, and during the modern period there have been changes in what Tibet is. Anthropologist Geoff Childs writes,

"[Tibet] has undergone numerous political transformations from a unified empire (640–842) incorporating parts of what are now Nepal, India, Pakistan, and several provinces of China (Gansu, Xinjiang, Sichuan, Yunnan), to a collection of independent and sometimes antagonistic kingdoms and polities associated with various monasteries (842–1248), to protectorate under the power of an expanding Mongol empire (1248–1368), back to a collection of independent and sometimes antagonistic kingdoms and polities associated with various monasteries (1368–1642), to a centralized state under the clerical administration of the Dalai Lamas (1642–1720), to a protectorate of the Manchu Qing Dynasty (1720–1911), and finally to a nation having de facto independence under the clerical administration of the Dalai Lamas (1911–1951) ..."

Although the central leadership in Lhasa had authority over these areas for various periods, some Western writers say that this did not imply the kind of political control seen in modern Western states. According to Luciano Petech, "K'ams [the Kham region, largely synonymous with the province of Xikang which was abolished in 1950] was practically independent of Lhasa under its great lamas" during the 18th century. Areas of Qinghai with large Tibetan populations were not continuously ruled by Lhasa, including the period leading up to the establishment of the PRC (in the late 1930s and 1940s) when Kuomintang Muslim warlord Ma Bufang ruled Qinghai as part of the Republic of China (ROC).

Definitions of Tibet have been contentious. Under the Qing dynasty (1644–1912) and the ROC (1912–1949), the part of Tibet governed by Lhasa was limited to the Tibet Autonomous Region and did not include China's Kham (Xikang) province. The western part of Xikang (Qamdo) and Qinghai were only governed by Lhasa during the Sino-Tibetan War of 1930–1932.

The Chinese government defines Tibet as the area it has designated the Tibet Autonomous Region: the traditional areas of Ü, Tsang and Ngari and Qamdo (western Xikang, which was incorporated into the TAR when Xikang Province was abolished by the National People's Congress in 1955. According to the Central Tibetan Administration (the Tibetan government-in-exile), other ethnically-Tibetan areas in the east and north are part of Greater Tibet; these areas are in the Chinese provinces of Qinghai, Gansu, Sichuan and Yunnan.

Serfdom in Tibet is a politicised debate, with the term "feudal serfdom" largely used by China as justification for taking control of Tibet. According to China,

"... There was a historically imperative need for the progress of Tibetan society and the welfare of the Tibetan people to expel the imperialists and shake off the yoke of feudal serfdom. The founding of the People's Republic of China in 1949 brought hope for the deeply distressed Tibetan people. In conforming to the law of historical development and the interests of the Tibetan people, the Central People's Government worked actively to bring about Tibet's peaceful liberation. After that, important policies and measures were adopted for Tibet's Democratic Reform, regional autonomy, large-scale modernization and reform and opening-up."

The Tibetan Government-in-Exile says,

"... The Chinese justifications make no sense. First of all, international law does not accept justifications of this type. No country is allowed to invade, occupy, annex and colonize another country just because its social structure does not please it. Secondly, the PRC is responsible for bringing more suffering in the name of liberation. Thirdly, necessary reforms were initiated and Tibetans are quite capable of doing so."

== History debates ==
It is difficult to find academic consensus on the nature of society in Tibetan history. Sources on the history of Tibet exist from pro-Chinese and pro-Tibetan writers.

Pro-Chinese histories may be published by mainstream Western publishers or in China; Tibetan histories may be published by mainstream Western publishers or by the Tibetan Government-in-Exile. Both sides hope to persuade foreign readers to support their point of view.

Many pro-Chinese works in English on the subject were translated from the Chinese. According to John Powers, ideology was the most powerful influence on the translations: "In contemporary China, the Communist Party strictly controls the presentation of history, and several formal resolutions have been issued by the Central Committee, which are intended to guide historians in the 'correct' interpretation of historical events and actors."

Western authors' writings on Tibetan history are sometimes contradictory. Hugh Richardson, who lived in Lhasa in the 1930s and 1940s (before the 1951 takeover), writes in Tibet and Its History that Chinese versions of Tibetan history are contemptible; in his view, Chinese rule is brutal and illegal. Israel Epstein, a naturalized Chinese citizen born in Poland, supported Chinese rule. His firsthand experiences in Tibet were after annexation, and his opinion could be influenced by the Chinese narrative. There are few academic assessments of Tibet's recent history. Anthropologist and historian Melvyn Goldstein is fluent in Tibetan, and has done considerable fieldwork with Tibetans in exile and in Tibet. He considers pre-1950 Tibet a feudal theocracy impaired by corrupt, incompetent leaders. It was de facto independent of China from 1911 to 1949, but not recognized as de jure independent by any nation (including its protective power, Great Britain).

China seeks to persuade international perception of the justification of Chinese rule in Tibet. Their position is that Tibet historically belongs to China, that affairs of Tibet are internal matters and Tibetans seek to internationalize their cause, in part, by convincing readers that Tibet was independent. Concentrating on national sovereignty, the position of the Tibetan Government-in-Exile is more moderate than some of its more extreme supporters who conflate lama rule with Tibetan Buddhist ideals and seeking to promote a Buddhist dogma which competes with the Marxist one of "feudal serfdom" by portraying Tibet under the lamas as, in Robert Thurman's words, "a mandala of the peaceful, perfected universe". Tibetologist Robert Barnett writes,

"Chinese references to preliberation conditions in Tibet thus appear to be aimed at creating popular support for Beijing's project in Tibet. These claims have particular resonance among people who share the assumption—based on nineteenth-century Western theories of "social evolution" that are still widely accepted in China—that certain forms of society are "backward" and should be helped to evolve by more "advanced" societies. This form of prejudice converges with some earlier Chinese views and with vulgar Marxist theories that imagine a vanguard movement liberating the oppressed classes or nationalities in a society, whether or not those classes agree that they are oppressed. Moreover, the Chinese have to present that oppression as very extensive, and that society as very primitive, in order to explain why there were no calls by the Tibetan peasantry for Chinese intervention on their behalf.

The question of Tibet's social history is therefore highly politicized, and Chinese claims in this respect are intrinsic to the functioning of the PRC, and not some free act of intellectual exploration. They have accordingly to be treated with caution. From a human rights point of view, the question of whether Tibet was feudal in the past is irrelevant. A more immediate question is why the PRC does not allow open discussion of whether Tibet was feudal or oppressive. Writers and researchers in Tibet face serious repercussions if they do not concur with official positions on issues such as social conditions in Tibet prior to its "liberation," and in such a restrictive climate, the regime's claims on this issue have little credibility."

=== Political debate ===
Chinese sources portray Tibet before 1950 as a feudal serfdom in which serfs suffered under the despotic rule of lamas and aristocrats. Tibetan sources describe the people as happy, content, and devoted to Buddhism. Tibetan Phuntsok Wangyal, who founded the Tibetan Communist Party in the 1940s, describes the old system as unequal and exploitative.

One of the earliest publications in English to apply the term "serf" to Tibet was Marxist journalist Anna Louise Strong's 1960 When Serfs Stood up in Tibet, published by the Chinese government. Another early promoter of the term is historian A. Tom Grunfeld, who based his writings on the work of British explorers of the region (particularly Charles Alfred Bell). His book is reportedly not supported by traditional Tibetan, Chinese, or Indian histories, contains inaccuracies and distortions, and Grunfeld's extracts from Bell were taken out of context to mislead readers. Grunfeld is a polarizing figure for the Chinese (who praise his work, scholarship, and integrity) and the Tibetans, who call him a "sinologist" who lacks authority on Tibetan history due to his inability to read Tibetan and not having visited Tibet before writing his book. Political scientist Michael Parenti's 2003 essay, Friendly Feudalism: The Tibet Myth (revised in 2007), was largely based on Strong, Grunfeld, and Stuart and Roma Gelder's 1964 Timely Rain: Travels in New Tibet.

Melvyn Goldstein, author of a number of works on Tibetan society since the 1960s, used "serf" to translate the Tibetan term mi ser ("yellow person"; also translated as "peasant") and to describe landless peasants and wealthier landowning, taxpaying families: "With the exception of about 300 noble families, all laymen and laywomen in Tibet were serfs (Mi ser) bound via ascription by parallel descent to a particular lord (dPon-po) though an estate, in other words sons were ascribed to their father's lord but daughters to their mother's lord." In his 1989 book A History of Modern Tibet, Goldstein wrote that serfdom was prevalent in Tibet but it was not an entirely-static society. There were several types of serf sub-statuses; one of the most important was the "human lease", which enabled a serf to acquire a degree of personal freedom. This was an alternative which, despite retaining the concept of lordship, partially freed the mi ser from obligations to a landed estate (usually for an annual fee). In 1997, Goldstein used the term "serf" in a more cautious way: "... Monastic and aristocratic elites ... held most of the land in Tibet in the form of feudal estates with hereditarily bound serflike peasants". John Powers has characterized Goldstein as "generally pro-China", but called his History of Modern Tibet "the most balanced treatment". Goldstein has said that he has conservative political views. According to William Monroe Coleman, China misrepresents Goldstein's usage as support for its version of Tibetan history.

Goldstein distinguished serfdom from feudalism, and applied the term "serfdom" (not "feudalism") to old Tibet. He tried to avoid appearing to support China's invasion of Tibet, writing that China left the traditional system in place after the invasion of 1950 and after the Dalai Lama's flight into exile in 1959. Goldstein wrote that in 1950, China claimed that it was freeing Tibet from imperialist influence rather than serfdom. His usage has been misinterpreted as supporting the Chinese Marxist view that feudalism and serfdom are inseparable, and old Tibet is consistently described as "feudal serfdom".

Not all writers who use the term "serfdom" to describe pre-1950 Tibet do so pejoratively. Pico Iyer, a journalist whose father is a friend of the Dalai Lama and who has been in private conversation with him for over thirty years, writes: "Almost as soon as he came into exile, in 1959, the Dalai Lama seized the chance to get rid of much of the red tape and serfdom that had beset Tibet in the past". The Dalai Lama used the term "serf" in 1991: "The relationship between landlord and serf was much milder in Tibet than in China and conditions for the poor were much less harsh."

Several Tibetan sources portray Tibetan peasants and workers to support their view of a Tibetan people who were independent of China, found the Chinese alien and incomprehensible, and experienced genocide under Chinese rule. Hugh Edward Richardson, British trade envoy to Tibet in the 1940s, agrees with Tibetan authors that there was little difference between rich and poor.

Journalist Thomas Laird wrote that scholars debate the applicability of these terms to Tibet, and lack sufficient data. Barbara Crossette wrote in 1998 that "scholars of Tibet mostly agree that there has been no systematic serfdom in Tibet in centuries."

The Tibetan government-in-exile says about conditions in Tibet before communism:

"Traditional Tibetan society was, by no means, perfect and was in need of changes. The Dalai Lama and other Tibetan leaders have admitted as much. That is the reason why the Dalai Lama initiated far-reaching reforms in Tibet as soon as he assumed temporal authority. The traditional Tibetan society, however, was not nearly as bad as China would have us believe."

=== Academic debate ===
The academic debate about whether "serf" is an applicable term for a society such as pre-1950 Tibet continues. The applicability of the concept of serfdom to Tibet was debated between Melvyn Goldstein and anthropologist Beatrice D. Miller of Wisconsin University in a series of five articles in the Tibet Journal. The debate was initiated by Goldstein in the journal's 11th edition, where he defended his description of Tibetan society as comparable to European serfdom. He based his comparison on the features of serfdom described by French historian Marc Bloch, including:

- Hereditary status.
- A serf (unlike a slave) had rights and possessions, but did not own land.
- The lord had the legal right to command his serfs, including judicial authority over them.

Goldstein said that Tibetan society met all these requirements, disagreeing with fellow scholars Miller, Micheal, Dargyay and Aziz. He defended his assertions with research, first-hand accounts and case studies.

Only Miller responded in the next Tibet Journal, in a brief 1987 letter. She acknowledged Goldstein's scholarship ("Goldstein's article ... cannot be faulted. It is an outstanding example of his exemplary collection of fine data") but disagreed with his interpretation—specifically, the use of the word "serf"—and wrote:

- That a lord also had obligations to the central government, so the obligations of a peasant (Tibetan: mi ser) to a lord were examples of general societal obligations.
- That obligations owed to a lord were by the family, and not individual.
- That the obligations of a peasant were not onerous, since it was easy to run away.

Goldstein replied in the following issue that:

- A lord's relationship to the central government was different from, and irrelevant to, the peasant-lord relationship.
- Although corvée obligations fell primarily on households, a peasant's personal legal status was hereditary and irrevocable.
- Running away was illegal, and European serfs also ran away.
- The peasant-lord relationship was not fundamentally contractual.

In a later publication and response, Goldstein agreed to disagree about use of the word "serf" to prevent a terminological discussion distracting from the examination of societal conditions; running away was an act of desperation which cut familial, social and economic ties. He discussed the form of partial manumission known as "human lease", saying that it temporarily freed from daily service but not occasional service at the lord's discretion; the payment of an annual fee set by the lord was required, and it was revocable at will by the lord. According to Goldstein, human lease was a weak form of manumission.

Coleman, integrating Goldstein's research with work by scholars such as Rebecca French, Graham Clarke, and Franz Michael, wrote that Goldstein overemphasized the de jure status of the mi ser at the expense of their de facto characteristics: a high degree of social and economic mobility (autonomy); frequently-successful negotiations with lords to improve their status, and flight from untenable situations such as unpayable debts and exorbitant labor requirements. According to Coleman, "serf" is a misleading translation of the Tibetan mi ser.

== Human rights ==
Chinese sources cite human-rights abuses as a justification for China's invasion, but such abuses (state-sanctioned and otherwise) occurred before and after 1950.

=== Before 1950 ===
Judicial mutilation, principally gouging out eyes and cutting off hands or feet, was formalized in the Sakya school as part of the 13th-century Tibetan legal code and was used as punishment until it was declared illegal in 1913 by a proclamation from the 13th Dalai Lama. However, cases are documented much later on despite the changes in legal codes. The Dalai Lama also banned capital punishment, making Tibet one of the first regions to do so (preceding Switzerland, the UK and France). The 14th Dalai Lama's brother, Jigme Norbu, reported that living conditions in jails were improved; officials were designated to ensure that the conditions were maintained.

Incidents of mutilation were recorded in Tibet from the beginning of the 20th century to the Chinese occupation. Tibetan communist Phuntso Wangye recalled his anger at seeing freshly-severed human ears hanging from the gate of the county headquarters in Damshung (north of Lhasa) in 1945.

Robert W. Ford, one of the few Westerners appointed by the government of Tibet during its de facto independence, spent five years in Tibet (from 1945 to 1950) before his arrest by the Chinese army. In his book, Wind Between the Worlds: Captured in Tibet, Ford wrote: "All over Tibet I had seen men who had been deprived of an arm or a leg for theft (...) Penal amputations were done without antiseptics or sterile dressings". Former Nazi Party member Heinrich Harrer, who lived in Tibet from 1944 to 1951, wrote in Return to Tibet that the mutilations had ceased:

"The so-called "chamber of horrors" at the foot of the Potala is also no longer shown. I believe that the Chinese were perfectly well aware that they were conning the tourists with displays of desiccated human arms, flutes made from femurs, and silver-mounted skulls; these objects, they used to maintain, testified to torture, flogging and other atrocities. Even Wangdu was so much under Chinese influence that he confirmed the atrocity stories spread by the Chinese about the Tibetans. He reminded me that in the days of the fifth Dalai Lama (in the eighteenth century), and even under the thirteenth (1900– 33), Tibetans still had their hands and feet chopped off. In reply to my direct question he had to admit that this had ceased to happen during my time in Tibet."

Tibetan Buddhism prohibits killing, but mutilation and other cruel punishment was used in old Tibet. Tsepon Lungshar, an official who had been educated in England, introduced reform during the 1920s. After losing a 1934 political struggle, the reformer was sentenced to be blinded by having his eyeballs pulled out. "The method involved the placement of a smooth, round yak's knucklebone on each of the temples of the prisoner. These were then tied by leather thongs around the head and tightened by turning the thongs with a stick on top of the head until the eyeballs popped out. The mutilation was terribly bungled. Only one eyeball popped out, and eventually the ragyaba had to cut out the other eyeball with a knife. Boiling oil was then poured into the sockets to cauterize the wound." This was sufficiently unusual that the untouchables (ragyapba) who carried it out had no previous experience of the correct technique, and had to rely on instructions from their parents. An unsuccessful attempt was made to anesthetize Lungshar with intoxicants before performing the mutilation.

When CIA officer Douglas Mackiernan was mistakenly killed in 1950, six Tibetan border guards were tried and sentenced in Lhasa. "The leader was to have his nose and both ears cut off. The man who fired the first shot was to lose both ears. A third man was to lose one ear, and the others were to get 50 lashes each." The sentences were reduced to 200, 50 and 25 lashes, respectively, after agent Frank Bessac requested leniency.

Whipping was legal and common as punishment for minor infractions, outside judicial processes. Whipping could have fatal consequences; trader Gyebo Sherpa was subjected to a severe whipping for selling cigarettes, and died from his injuries two days later in the Potala prison. Tibetologist Tashi Tsering remembered being whipped as a 13-year-old for missing a performance as a dancer in the Dalai Lama's dance troupe in 1942 until his skin split and the pain became excruciating. China says that human rights were "severely infringed upon" by the Dalai Lama's administration, but the evidence of these allegations is disputed.

Rebecca French wrote that Tibetans viewed criminal offenses as uncommon, but few records exist to establish their frequency; Tibetans believe that theft and banditry were common, however, especially along trade routes. Because government action in disputes was considered harsh by most Tibetans, they tended to seek alternative settlements and leniency from local courts and officials.

Political power could play a role in the Tibetan judicial process. Lungshar was a deposed member of the Kashag who had proposed democratic reform and was charged with planning a coup and the attempted murder of another Kashag member who opposed reform. His conviction was based on the evidence of one informer, who claimed to have seen a document which was never produced. He was richly rewarded for an apparent show trial by anti-reform traditionalists. Only ten days elapsed from Lungshar's arrest to his blinding, limiting the possibility of appeal.

British diplomat Eric Teichman relayed a 1916 report from eastern Tibet by an American missionary during China's Warlord Era:

"There is no method of torture known that is not practiced in here on these Tibetans, slicing, boiling, tearing asunder and all ... To sum up what China is doing here in eastern Tibet, the main things are collecting taxes, robbing, oppressing, confiscating, and allowing her representatives to burn and loot and steal."

Believing that the missionary's account might be mistaken, Teichman noted that any brutality was "in no way due to any action of the Chinese government in Peking or the provincial authorities in Szechuana".

=== Slavery ===
Israel Epstein wrote that before the communist takeover, poverty in Tibet was so severe that peasants sometimes had to hand over children to the manor as household servants (nangzan) because they were too poor to raise them. Laird wrote that Tibetan peasants were well off and immune to famine during the 1940s, although starvation was common in China. According to other sources, "slaves" were domestic servants and managers of estates.

In 1904, a British expeditionary force occupied the Chumbi Valley (the border region adjacent to Bhutan and India) for four years. Charles Alfred Bell was put in charge of the district from September 1904 to November 1905 and wrote that slavery was practiced in Chumbi, but had greatly declined over the previous thirty years. Bell noted that only one or two dozen slaves remained (unlike nearby Bhutan, where slavery was more widespread): "Slavery in the Chumpi valley was of a very mild type. If a slave was not well treated, it was easy for him to escape into Sikkim and British India."

=== After the Chinese takeover ===
The Chinese and the Tibetan exile community have opposing views on the fate of ordinary Tibetans since 1950. Chinese sources in English describe rapid progress for prosperous, free, and happy Tibetans participating in democratic reforms. Exiled Tibetans claim Chinese genocide in Tibet, comparing the Chinese to the Nazis, an extremely contentious characterization. After the Cultural Revolution, scholar Warren Smith (whose work became focused on Tibetan history and politics after he spent five months in Tibet in 1982) claimed the Chinese to be chauvinists who believe that they are superior to the Tibetans and alleged that they use torture, coercion and starvation to control the Tibetans.

The Tibet Autonomous Region is generally poorer than other provinces of China due to its high elevation and remoteness. In 1980, to help Tibet out of poverty, the 1st Tibet Work Forum (moderated by Hu Yaobang, General Secretary of the Chinese Communist Party), gave the region financial support to build a "united, prosperous, civilized new Tibet". After this forum, taxes on agriculture and animal husbandry in Tibet were waived; other provinces waited until 2006 for the same. The people's commune economic system was dismantled (in other provinces, it was ended in 1985), and farmland and livestock reverted to households. Tibet is China's only provincial-level administrative region with some tax incentives, and (after 1988) the only provincial-level administrative region which receives substantial quota subsidies from the central government. Under the "partner assistance" policy, wealthier provinces and municipalities under the central government, most central-government organs, and some central enterprises assist Tibet's prefectures and cities. In 1988, the Tibet Autonomous Region eliminated its fiscal deficit for the first time in history. As China's only provincial-level "poverty-stricken areas which lie in vast, contiguous stretches", Tibet developed anti-poverty programs and its impoverished population is somewhat lower. Its social-security system has been completely established, and includes the region's 29,000 Buddhist monks and nuns.

Evidence of human-rights infringement includes the 2006 Nangpa La shootings. According to Human Rights Watch World Report 2008: Events in China 2007,

"Widespread and numerous instances of repression target ordinary citizens, monks, nuns, and even children in an effort to quash alleged "separatism." Seven Tibetan boys in Gansu province were detained for over a month in early September after they allegedly wrote slogans on the walls of a village police station and elsewhere calling for the return of the Dalai Lama and a free Tibet. Ronggyal Adrak was detained and charged under state security offenses by police on August 1 after he called for the Dalai Lama's return at a horse race festival in Sichuan province. He is awaiting trial. The Chinese government has failed to bring to justice those responsible for the shooting death by People's Armed Police officers of a 17-year-old nun, Kelsang Namtso, while trying to cross the border into Nepal on September 30, 2006."

During the 5th Tibet Work Forum in 2010, the central government declared its intention to improve Tibetan areas overall by 2020. In 2023, the regional government said that Tibet was providing medical insurance, pension schemes, subsistence allowances, accident-injury insurance, and health-check expenses for the region's registered monks and nuns.

== Comparison to other regions ==
Neighboring Bhutan abolished slavery and feudalism as part of modernization reforms in 1958 at the behest of its third king, Jigme Dorji Wangchuck, who ascended to the throne in 1952 at age 25. Jigme Dorji enacted legal reforms, giving citizenship and land ownership to former slaves. Until then, slavery and serfdom were common legal, economic, and social institutions and the backbone of Bhutan's pre-monetary economy.

According to the United Nations Research Institute for Social Development, bonded labor and other forms of economic exploitation has existed in nearby regions, including India and Nepal. Kamaiya, the bonded-labor system in Nepal, was abolished in 2000.

== See also ==
- Battle of Chamdo
- Serfs' Emancipation Day
- Tibetan sovereignty debate
- Tibetan Uprising Day
