= Tibetan Uprising =

Tibetan Uprising may refer to:

- The 1959 Tibetan uprising
- The 2008 Tibetan unrest
- Tibetan Uprising Day, observed on March 10.
