= Meena Dhanda =

- Occupation: Philosopher
- Known for: Anti-racism and anti-castism

Dr. Meena Dhanda is an Indian philosopher and writer, based in the United Kingdom. She is a professor of Philosophy and Cultural Politics at the University of Wolverhampton, and is internationally recognised as a leading academic in the development of diaspora Dalit studies. She conducts philosophy with a 'practical intent', and her work has confirmed existence of caste discrimination in Britain in areas covered by the Equality Act 2010, and pushed for more legal protections against caste-based discrimination.

== Biography ==
Meena Dhanda arrived in the UK from Punjab, India in 1987 with an award of the Commonwealth Scholarship for her doctoral work in Philosophy at Balliol College, Oxford University. She was a Rhodes Junior Research Fellow at St Hilda's College, Oxford, before taking up a full-time lecturing position at the University of Wolverhampton in 1992, progressing to a Readership (Associate Professorship) in 2010. She was promoted Professor on September 17, 2018.

Dhanda has written about problems of racism within the field of philosophy, calling for more diversity within the field, and has spoken of the importance for her of doing "socially engaged philosophy."

She has been an active member of the UK branch of the Society for Women in Philosophy for more than 25 years, and as of 2017, sits on the society's Funding Committee.

== Main works ==
From September 2013 to February 2014 Dhanda led a project on 'Caste in Britain' for the UK Equality and Human Rights Commission (EHRC), through which she produced two research reports – "Caste in Britain: Socio-legal Review", and "Caste in Britain: Experts' Seminar and Stakeholders' Workshop."

She has published numerous transdisciplinary papers on topics of caste and race, including 'Punjabi Dalit Youth: Social Dynamics of Transitions in Identity', (Contemporary South Asia, 2009); 'Runaway Marriages: A Silent Revolution?', (Economic and Political Weekly, 2012); 'Certain Allegiances, Uncertain Identities: The Fraught Struggles of Dalits in Britain' (Tracing the New Indian Diaspora, 2014); 'Do only South Asians reclaim honour'? ('Honour' and Women's Rights, 2014); 'Anti-Castism and Misplaced Nativism' (Radical Philosophy, 2015).

She has published two books: a monograph, The Negotiation of Personal Identity (Saarbrüken: VDM Verlag, 2008) and Reservations for Women (New Delhi: Women Unlimited, 2008).

== Awards and honours ==
She was awarded a Leverhulme Research Fellowship for a primary research project 'Caste Aside: Dalit Punjabi Identity and Experience' concluded in 2012.

== Bibliography ==
=== Journal articles and reports ===
- Dhanda, M. (2009) 'Punjabi Dalit Youth: Social Dynamics of Transitions in Identity', Contemporary South Asia, 17, 1: 47–64.
- Dhanda, M. (2013) 'Caste and International Migration, India to the UK', in I. Ness (ed.), The Encyclopedia of Global Human Migration. Wiley Blackwell.
- Dhanda, M. (2013) 'Certain Allegiances, Uncertain Identities: The Fraught Struggles of Dalits in Britain', in O.P. Dwivedi (ed.), The New Indian Diaspora. New York: Editions Rodopi, 99–119.
- Dhanda, M. (2015) 'Anti-Castism and Misplaced Nativism: Mapping caste as an aspect of race' Radical Philosophy, 192, July-Aug, pp. 33–43.
- Dhanda, M., Mosse, D., Waughray, A., Keane, D., Green, R., Iafrati, S. and Mundy, J.K. (2014) Caste in Britain: Experts' Seminar and Stakeholders' Workshop. Equality and Human Rights Commission Research Report no. 92. Manchester: Equality and Human Rights Commission.
- Dhanda, M., Waughray, A., Keane, D., Mosse, D., Green, R. and Whittle, S. (2014) Caste in Britain: Socio-legal Review. Equality and Human Rights Commission Research Report no. 91. Manchester: Equality and Human Rights Commission.
- Dhanda, M. (2020) Philosophical Foundations of Anti-Casteism. . Proceedings of the Aristotelian Society, 120, 1: 71–96.
