= The Story of Tibet =

2006 book by Thomas Laird

The Story of Tibet: Conversations with the Dalai Lama
- Author: Thomas Laird
- Language: English
- Subject: Anthropology
- Genre: Nonfiction
- Published: 2006
- Publisher: Grove Press
- Publication place: United States
- Media type: Hardcover
- Pages: 470
- ISBN: 978-0-8021-1827-1

The Story of Tibet: Conversations with the Dalai Lama is a non-fiction book authored by Thomas Laird, an American journalist based out of Kathmandu, Nepal.

== Background ==
The book is based on nearly sixty hours of intimate conversations with the 14th Dalai Lama, whom the author met for the first time in 1993.

== Reception ==
Pico Iyer, in his book The Open Road: The Global Journey of the Fourteenth Dalai Lama, writes: “Thomas Laird’s book, The Story of Tibet, in which the author gets the Dalai Lama to travel through the whole of Tibetan history from his perspective, already seems to me one of the essential and irreplaceable books in the field, and allows one to hear and feel the Dalai Lama’s particular voice with unique immediacy."

Dartmouth College's assistant professor of anthropology Sienna Craig in her review for the Himalaya, the Journal of the Association for Nepal and Himalayan Studies, suggests that the book "does a good job of not slipping into sentimentality or easy simplifications of Tibet’s social and political history, vis-à-vis China, India, Mongolia, and the West."

Writing for Common Knowledge, Alick Isaacs (of Shalom Hartman Institute) suggests that "[the book is] gentle blend of acquiescence, defiance, and self-criticism are on intimate view as he [14th Dalai Lama] continues his struggle for Tibet with determination but without the bitterness that comes from attachment."

Publishers Weekly reviews the book, "Laird traces Tibet's sometimes tortured relationships with China and India, recounting the country's conflicts with the Mongols and the Manchu Empire, as well as its struggles for independence in the face of Chinese occupation."
