= Banwaon people =

The Banwaon people are an ethnic groups in Mindanao, also known as the Adgawanon, Banuaonon, Banwanon, Higaonon-Banwaon and Manobo. There are concentrations of Banwaons found in the island of Mindanao in the Filipino province of Agusan del Sur. The largest concentrations are in and around San Luis, Maasam and the Libang river valley.
