= Social class in Tibet =

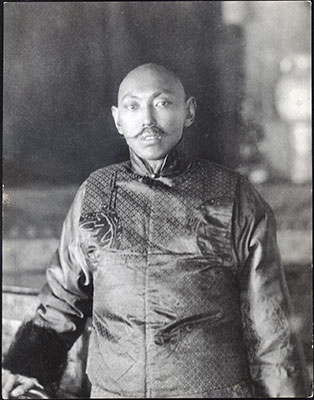
Thubten Gyatso, the 13th Dalai Lama photographed in Calcutta in 1910

There were three main feudal social groups in Tibet prior to 1959, namely ordinary laypeople (mi ser in Tibetan), lay nobility (sger pa), and monks. The ordinary layperson could be further classified as a peasant farmer (shing-pa) or nomadic pastoralist (trokpa). To influence politics and religion, entering into monkhood and the military was required.

The Tsangpa Dynasty (1565-1642) and Ganden Phodrang (1642-1950) law codes distinguished three social divisions: high, medium and low. Each in turn was divided into three classes, to give nine classes in all. Social status was a formal classification, mostly hereditary and had legal consequences: for example the compensation to be paid for the killing of a member of these classes varied from 5 (for the lowest) to 200 'sung' for the second highest, the members of the noble families.

Nobles, government officials and monks of pure conduct were in the high division, only – probably – the Dalai Lama was in the very highest position. The middle division contained a large portion of the population and ranged from minor government officials, to taxpayer and landholding peasants, to landless peasants. Social mobility was possible in the middle division. The lower division contained ragyabpa of different types: e.g. blacksmiths and butchers. The very lowest class contained executioners, and (in the Tsang code) bachelors and hermaphrodites.

Anthropologists have presented different taxonomies for the middle social division, in part because they studied specific regions of Tibet and the terms were not universal. Both Melvyn Goldstein and Geoff Childs however classified the population into three main types:

- taxpayer families (tre-ba or khral-pa)
- householders (du-jong or dud-chung-ba)
- landless peasants (mi-bo)

In the middle group, the taxpaying families could be quite wealthy. Depending upon the district, each category had different responsibilities in terms of tax and labor. Membership to each of these classes was primarily hereditary; the linkage between subjects and their estate and overlord was similarly transmitted through parallel descent. The taxpayer class, although numerically smallest among the three subclasses, occupied a superior position in terms of political and economic status.

== The Higher Division ==
The highest of the high class was empty, or only contained possibly the Dalai Lama.

=== The Nobility ===
The middle class of the high division – the highest attainable in practice – was headed by the hereditary nobility. Yabshi were thought to be descendants of the Dalai Lamas, depon were descendants of the ancient royal families, midak were on a slightly lower level.

There were "a small group of about 30 higher status families" and "120 to 170 lower or 'common' aristocratic families".

=== High Government and Monk Officials ===
High government officials were appointed from the aristocracy. Monk officials were usually drawn from Lhasa middle classes, the families of existing monk officials, or were the second sons of the aristocracy. They were usually monks in name only, one night spent in a monastery being sufficient to qualify as a monk for this purpose.

== The Middle Division ==
=== Taxpayer families ===
The treba (also tralpa or khral-pa) taxpayers lived in "corporate family units" that hereditarily owned estates leased from their district authority, complete with land titles. In Goldstein's review of the Gyantse district he found that a taxpayer family typically owned from 20 acres (81,000 m^{2}) to 300 acres (1.2 km^{2}) of land each. Their primary civil responsibility was to pay taxes (tre-ba and khral-pa means "taxpayer"), and to supply corvée services that included both human and animal labor to their district authority. They had a comfortable standard of living. They also frequently practiced polyandry in marriage and other practices to maintain a single marriage per generation and avoid parceling land holdings.

=== Householders ===
The householder class (du-jung, dud-chung-ba duiqoin, duiqion, düchung, dudchhung, duigoin or dujung) comprised peasants who held only small plots of land that were legally and literally "individual" possessions. This was different from the taxpayer families who owned land as a familial corporation. Land inheritance rules for the householders were quite different from taxpayer family rules, in that there was no certainty as to whether a plot of land would be inherited by his son. The district authority — either governmental, monastic, or aristocratic — was the ultimate landowner and decided inheritance. Compared to the taxpayer families the householders, however, had lighter tax obligations and only human labor corvée obligations to their district authorities. These obligations, unlike the taxpayer family obligations, fell only on the individual and not on his family.

=== Landless peasants ===
Landless peasants (mi-bo) did not have heritable rights to land. They were still obligated to their 'owning' estate under their status as mi-ser. In contrast with the taxpayer families and householders, they had the freedom to go wherever they wanted and could engage in trade or crafts. When farming, they might lease land from taxpayer families and as payment take on work for those families. Like the householders the landless peasants also used resources in their own individual capacity which were non-heritable.

The relative freedom of the mi-bo status was usually purchased by an annual fee to the estate to which the mi-bo belonged. The fee could be raised if the mi-bo prospered, and the lord could still exact special corvée labor, e.g. for a special event.

The status could be revoked at the will of the estate owner. The offspring of the mi-bo did not automatically inherit the status of 'mi-bo', they did inherit the status of 'mi-ser', and could be indentured to service in their earlier teens, or would have to pay their own mi-bo fee.

== The Lower Division ==
=== Ragyabpa ===
The ragyabpa feudal class were at bottom level, and they performed the 'unclean' work. This included fishermen, butchers, executioners, corpse disposers, blacksmiths, goldsmiths and prostitutes. Ragyabpa were also divided into three divisions: for instance a goldsmith was considered to be in the highest division of this feudal class, and was not regarded as being as defiled as an executioner, who was in the lowest.

=== Nangzan – Household servants ===
According to Chinese government sources, Nangzan (also nangzen, nangzan, nangsen) were hereditary household servants comprising 5% of the population.

=== Slavery ===
According to American sinologist A. Tom Grunfeld there were a few slaves in Tibet. Grunfeld quotes Sir Charles Bell, a British colonial official in the Chumbi Valley in the early 20th century and a Tibet scholar who wrote of slaves in the form of small children being stolen or bought from their parents, too poor to support them, to be brought up and kept or sold as slaves. These children came mostly from south-eastern Tibet and the territories of the tribes that dwelt between Tibet and Assam. Grunfeld omits Bell's elaboration that in 1905, there were "a dozen or two" of these, and that it was "a very mild form of slavery". According to exile Tibetan writer Jamyang Norbu, later accounts from Westerners who visited Tibet and even long-term foreign residents such as Heinrich Harrer, Peter Aufschnaiter, Hugh Richardson and David Macdonald did not personally witness any such practice.

== See also ==
- Tibet serfdom controversy
