= Serfs' Emancipation Day =

Annual holiday in Tibet

- Also called: Serfs' Liberation Day
- Date: 28 March
- Next time: 28 March 2027
- Frequency: Annual

Serfs' Emancipation Day
- Simplified Chinese: 西藏百万农奴解放纪念日
- Traditional Chinese: 西藏百萬農奴解放紀念日
- Literal meaning: Tibet one million serfs liberation commemoration day
Transcriptions
Standard Mandarin
- Hanyu Pinyin: Xīzàng Bǎiwàn Nóngnú Jiěfàng Jìnìan Rì

Serfs' Emancipation Day, observed annually on 28 March, is a holiday in the Tibet Autonomous Region of China that celebrates the emancipation of serfs in Tibet. The holiday was adopted by the Tibetan legislature on 19 January 2009 and it was promulgated that same year. In modern Tibetan history, the Chinese Premier Zhou Enlai declared the dissolution of the Tibetan government on 28 March 1959 and he replaced it with the temporary Preparatory Committee for the Tibet Autonomous Region (PCTAR), with the Panchen Lama also replacing the Dalai Lama as its acting chairman.

== History ==
The holiday was announced to mark the 50th anniversary of the beginning of democratic reform of the Tibetan social structure on 28 March 1959, where according to China, one million people were freed from serfdom. The People's Republic of China had been established since 1949, and has had control over Tibet since 1951. According to Chinese state-run media, Mao Zedong had entered into negotiations with the 14th Dalai Lama to initiate land reform, but was told in 1957 that any reforms would have to be approved by the Tibetan nobility. Tensions culminated in the 1959 Tibetan uprising, which Chinese state-run media calls an attempt by feudal lords to continue the system forever, but the Dalai Lama calls a "national uprising". In retrospect, the Dalai Lama also prefers the term "poor people" for Tibetans, for which he says the designation "serf" is questionable. He also alleges that the Government of Tibet had drawn up plans to gradually lower hereditary debts, but that the central government was hesitant, preferring to do things their own way.

On 28 March, in what state-run China Daily called the simultaneous "end of serfdom and the abolition of the hierarchic social system characterized by theocracy", Zhou Enlai issued a State Council Order declaring the "dissolution" of the government of Tibet. The order also directed the People's Liberation Army to suppress the uprising, confiscate the possessions of the rebels, and give them to the serfs, which by China's estimate, comprised 90% of the population in Tibet. The resolution calling for the reforms to take place in Tibet was passed by the National People's Congress in Beijing on April 28, 1959, and formally adopted by the Preparatory Committee on July 17.

== Bill ==
In presenting it to the Tibetan legislature, Pang Boyong, Deputy Secretary General of the Tibetan Regional Congress Standing Committee, said the bill is aimed at "reminding all the Chinese people, including Tibetans, of the landmark 'democratic reform' initiated 50 years ago". On 19 January 2009, at the second annual session of the ninth regional People's Congress in 2009, 382 legislators voted unanimously for the bill, designating 28 March annually as Serfs' Emancipation Day.

== Observance ==
Serfs' Emancipation Day was celebrated in Lhasa on 28 March 2009. The procession started at 10 a.m. at Potala Palace, and the then-Governor Qiangba Puncog presided over the event, wearing traditional Tibetan dress. Local Communist Party secretary Zhang Qingli was also in attendance.

== Reaction ==
The office of the 14th Dalai Lama denounced the holiday, saying that China was trying to declare new holidays to "avoid the situation" in Tibet. Kent Ewing of the Asia Times called the holiday "a reminder of the feudal system that existed in Tibet before the Chinese invaded in 1950", but believes that the holiday will embitter Tibetans. Tsering Shakya echoes the Dalai Lama's condemnations, and also calls the celebrations "A choreographed spectacle" for "the delivery of public mass compliance to the leadership in Beijing" in response to "the widespread protests that engulfed the Tibetan plateau in March–April 2008" (see 2008 Tibetan unrest).

Warren W. Smith suggests that the government has chosen 28 March as "counter-propaganda" to the 2008 Tibetan unrest.

== See also ==
- Tibetan Uprising Day
