= Family patrimony =

Family patrimony is a type of civil law patrimony that is created by marriage or civil union (where recognized) which creates a bundle of entitlements and obligations that must be shared by the spouses or partners upon divorce, annulment, dissolution of marriage or dissolution of civil union, when there must be a division of property. It is similar to the common law concept of community property.
