= Thomas Laird =

American journalist and photographer (born 1953)

Thomas C. Laird
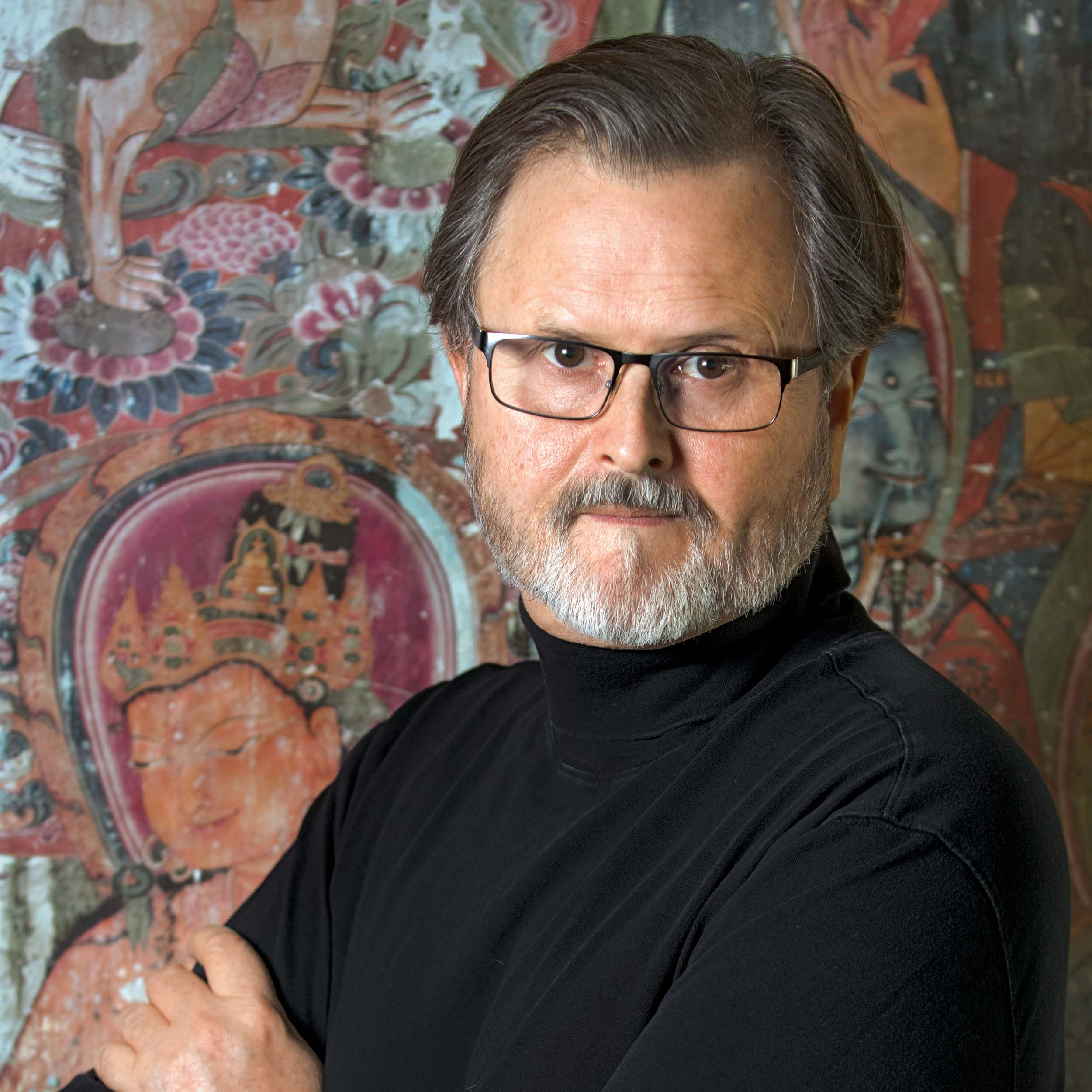
- Born: June 30, 1953 (age 73); U.S.
- Status: Active
- Occupations: Photographer, writer
- Website: thomaslaird.com thestoryoftibet.com intotibet.info muralsoftibet.com

Thomas C. Laird (born June 30, 1953) is an American journalist, writer, and photographer who specializes in Tibet.

Laird divides his time between New Orleans and Kathmandu, Nepal, where he lived for 30 years. He has photographed and written for publications such as Time and Newsweek.

== Life and work ==
At the age of 18, Laird left the United States and travelled, overland, alone, from Europe to Nepal, passing through Turkey, Iran, Afghanistan, Pakistan, and India. He made that trip six times within the next two years.

In 1973, after studying with Tibetan refugees in Nepal, he received grants from I.A.A. Anstalt to produce ethnographic sound recordings in Buddhist monasteries in Kathmandu, Nepal. The resulting record was one of the first LPs of Tibetan ritual music ever made, released by Lyrichord.

After travelling through revolution-ridden Iran, he settled full-time in Kathmandu, where he worked as a photographer, Himalayan guide, and journalist. He photographed the 1990 People's Movement for Stern, Asiaweek, and others, and a year later received the first ever one-year residence permit for Mustang. Peter Matthiessen and Laird collaborated to publish East of Lo Monthang: In The Land of Mustang in 1995. Laird was also the first Westerner to legally walk through the Himalayas of Western Nepal to Mount Kailash; and the first westerner to descend any part of Tibet's Tsangpo river in a coracle in modern times.

For Time and Newsweek, Laird wrote the first accurate report of Nepal's 2001 Royal Massacre, and reported from the battlefields of Nepal's Maoist revolution in 2003.

== Publications ==
Laird's first non-fiction book, Into Tibet: The CIA’s First Atomic Spy and His Secret Expedition to Lhasa, was the result of ten years of research regarding the life, work and death of Douglas Mackiernan, the first CIA intelligence officer ever killed in the line of duty. He unearthed thousands of pages of documents from the National Archives in Washington DC, and conducted one hundred hours of interviews with more than two dozen primary sources ranging from CIA members to the Dalai Lama.

His second non-fiction book, a history of Tibet entitled The Story of Tibet: Conversations with the Dalai Lama draws on over 60 hours of intimate conversations with the 14th Dalai Lama, whom he first met in 1993. Spanning 2,000 years of Himalayan civilization, the book is a popular history of Tibet—seen through the eyes of the Dalai Lama. About this book Pico Iyer writes: “Thomas Laird’s book, The Story of Tibet, in which the author gets the Dalai Lama to travel through the whole of Tibetan history from his perspective, already seems to me one of the essential and irreplaceable books in the field, and allows one to hear and feel the Dalai Lama’s particular voice with unique immediacy."

Laird has also worked on film projects Baraka (1990) and The Gurkhas (1998) in various roles, and was also Oliver Stone’s guide in Tibet in 1996.

Since 2008, he has worked to create the world's first life-size images of enormous Tibetan wall murals. Fine art prints of these works have been the focus of several exhibitions and are held in both public and private collections. Taschen published Murals of Tibet in 2018.
