= Douglas Mackiernan =

American CIA officer (1913–1950)

Douglas Seymour Mackiernan
- Born: April 25, 1913; Mexico City, Mexico
- Died: April 29, 1950 (aged 37); Changtang, Tibet, China
- Cause of death: Gunshot wounds
- Occupations: Spy and Diplomat at the Central Intelligence Agency

Douglas Seymour Mackiernan (April 25, 1913 – April 29, 1950) was an American intelligence officer and spy known for being the first officer of the Central Intelligence Agency (CIA) to be killed in the line of duty.

== Early life and career ==
Mackiernan was born in Mexico City, Mexico, to a father who had been a whaler and explorer. As a child, the young Mackiernan learned English, Spanish, French, and German. He was the oldest of five brothers: Duncan, Angus, Malcolm, and Stuart. His family later moved to Stoughton, Massachusetts, where he worked at his father's filling station business, and he and his brothers became amateur radio operators. MacKiernan was of Irish descent.

Mackiernan spent one year at Massachusetts Institute of Technology as a physics major in 1932 but dropped out and became a research assistant at the university. He served as a major in the US Army Air Corps during World War II, first as a cryptanalysis officer in 1942 in Washington, DC and then as a meteorological officer in Alaska and, from November 1943 to the end of the war, in Tiwha (now Ürümqi), the capital of Xinjiang (Sinkiang) Province. In February 1947, Mackiernan missed the adventure of the war and applied to the State Department for a position as a consular clerk at his former location in China. He was eagerly accepted, and by May, he was on his way back. He soon found himself recruited for and ideally suited to espionage work.

He worked as a cryptographer and a lieutenant colonel for the United States Army Air Forces and was then posted to China as an Air Force meteorologist during World War II. By 1947, he had quit the Air Force and was employed as a Paramilitary Officer in Special Activities Division (renamed Special Activities Center in 2016) by the CIA. As a cover for that work, he was assigned the position of Vice-Consul for the US State Department at its consulate in Ürümqi (Tihwa), in the Second East Turkestan Republic. He was sent to Peitashan during the Battle of Baitag Bogd on June 19, 1947, to meet with Chinese Hui, Salar, and Kazakh forces, who were fighting both the Outer Mongols and the Soviet Union.

== CIA career ==
In the CIA, his scientific background (he had dropped out of MIT after his freshman year) were employed in espionage and other intelligence of the Soviet atomic bomb. Until 2002, the CIA had classified information on Mackiernan collecting atomic intelligence about the Soviet Union's first atomic bomb (tested just across the border at the Semipalatinsk Test Site, in Kazakhstan). Mackiernan activities were first revealed by Thomas Laird, and confirmed by the CIA in 2008.

In the fall of 1949, Mackiernan led a party of five (including the two men who would survive the trip, Vasili Zvansov and Frank Bessac) out of Ürümqi. They first spent time with Osman Batur and his Kazakh warriors, who fought against the Chinese Communists, who were invading the Second East Turkestan Republic, and then traveled on to Tibet by horseback and camel en route to India. Mackiernan was shot dead by Tibetan border guards after crossing the Chang Tang of Tibet. The US government had failed to request permission, in a timely fashion, from the Tibetan government, and Tibetan messengers had not reached all border guards for the Mackiernan party to enter Tibet unharmed. With imminent threat of the Chinese invasion, Tibetan guards had standing orders in the tense spring of 1950 to shoot all foreigners who attempted to enter Tibet. Furthermore, Mackiernan and his party were dressed as Kazakhs; the Kazakhs in China and the Tibetans were traditional enemies and raided each other across the border.

Because he was the first CIA officer operating under diplomatic cover as a State Department employee to be killed, the CIA had not yet established procedures about pensions. Ultimately his wife and children were denied a CIA pension. In 1950, Peggy Mackiernan was awarded a small pension by the State Department, which was much smaller than her pension would have been if she had received the CIA pension that was due to her. It was only in 2000 that the first star on the CIA's Wall of Honor would be acknowledged to belong to Mackiernan in a secret memorial ceremony. Mackiernan's wife and family were present at the CIA's Langley, Virginia, headquarters.

== Final CIA mission ==
On September 2, 1945, the Japanese surrendered after they had inflicted great hardship during the Second Sino-Japanese War. The armies of Chiang Kai-shek's Republic of China were defeated by those of Mao Zedong's Chinese Communist Party during the spring and the summer of 1949. On July 29, Secretary of State Dean Acheson ordered the US consulate at Ürümqi, Second East Turkestan Republic or Xinjiang Province, Republic of China, to be closed as the Communist Chinese were expanding. Mackiernan was ordered to stay behind, officially to destroy consular records and equipment and covertly to continue atomic intelligence activities.

On August 10, 1949, Mackiernan sent a classified coded message to Acheson that acknowledged that he was operating the long-range atomic explosion detection equipment. By mid-September, Chiang's forces had switched sides without a fight, and Communist troops were due to invade Ürümqi at any point. Also, the Soviets had just completed their first atomic test in nearby Kazakhstan, on August 29, 1949. Mackiernan's work was now finished. Though it was still possible for Mackiernan to have flown out of Ürümqi on a regularly scheduled flight, Mackiernan and the CIA chose a different path: through Tibet to India.

Mackiernan may have feared that he would be arrested if he had tried to travel through Communist China, as were other US consuls during that period. By then, Mackiernan's work as an espionage agent was known to the communists. Whatever his motivation, on September 25, 1949, Mackiernan sent his last telegram, stating that provincial officials had accepted Chinese communist authority, and the communist army was about to enter the city.

Two days later, Mackiernan and a Fulbright scholar, Frank Bessac, drove out of the main gates of Ürümqi with their gear, which included machine guns, grenades, radios, gold bullion, navigation equipment, and survival supplies. The guards checked Mackiernan's passport and let him through. CIA employees of the period have described Bessac as a CIA contract agent. (Bessac denied the label, and, other than hearsay, no evidence exists to substantiate Bessac was a contract agent. Later, Bessac pondered if he would have joined the CIA, he could have gotten anti-aircraft guns and mines for the Tibetan defense of the impending Chinese invasion).

Mackiernan and Bessac met up with three anti-communist White Russian allies and rode out to spend more than a month with the Kazakh leader Osman Bator. Mackiernan left gold and a radio with Osman, who was seen by the invading Chinese as a rebel taking US support and saw himself as a man fighting for the independence of his people.

After a month with Osman Bator, the Mackiernan party embarked on a difficult journey by horseback and camel across 1,000 miles of Taklimakan desert. It traveled south-southwest by night towards the Himalayas. Mackiernan carefully recorded positions and landmarks and radioed their progress to Washington. Records of the radio transcripts have not been released by the CIA or the State Department. Mackiernan's log, with additions by Bessac after Mackiernan's death, was declassified in the 1990s, but some alleged that the document had been heavily doctored. By late November, the party reached the 10,000 ft "foothills" of the Kunlun Mountains, where it spent the winter with Hussein Taiji of the Kazakhs.

In March, the small group struggled over the mountains and then trekked across the vast uninhabited Changtang on the Tibetan Plateau. It arrived at the first Tibetan outpost on April 29, 1950. Bessac went over to talk with the Tibetans who were camped nearby. The rest of the party set up tents behind a slight hill. Bessac heard shots and, running over the hill, saw that Mackiernan and two White movement companions, Leonid and Stefan, were dead. Vasili Zvansov was badly wounded.

The Tibetan guards realized that they had made a mistake only five days later when they met a group of couriers from the Dalai Lama with a message of safe conduct for the group. The American government had delayed sending its request for permission for the Mackiernan party for so long that it was impossible for the Tibetan government to act in time. On June 11, 1950, Bessac and Zvansov finally reached Lhasa, just weeks before the beginning of the Korean War. According to Heinrich Harrer, who later befriended Bessac in Lhasa, the Tibetan soldiers who attacked Mackiernan's caravan had hoped to plunder their provisions but were later punished for their callousness. This was also mentioned in Life magazine, 1950.

Mackiernan's death, as a State Department official, was subsequently reported by The New York Times on July 29, 1950. His work as a CIA agent was first written about in a chapter of a book by Ted Gup, in 2001. However, it was not until 2003 that the journalist Thomas Laird published a book on Mackiernan's work, which revealed Mackiernan's atomic intelligence. Later in 2006, Mackiernan's CIA employment was acknowledged by the CIA, when his name was revealed in the CIA's Book of Honor. However, his work as an agent, and his atomic intelligence, was not fully recognized by the CIA until then-CIA Director Michael Hayden officially and publicly described Mackiernan's work during a speech in October 2008.
