= Frank Bessac =

American anthropologist and intelligence agent (1922–2010)

Francis Bagnall Bessac (pronounced bih-ZAK; Mongolian name Mergen Sang; Chinese name 白智仁 Bái Zhìrén; January 13, 1922 – December 6, 2010) was an American anthropologist who spent much of his life teaching the subject at the University of Montana, where he was appointed to the faculty in 1965. During the years toward the end of and immediately following World War II, Bessac served with the Office of Strategic Services (O.S.S.) and the US State Department in Western China and Mongolia. During their escape from Communist Chinese forces to Tibet in 1950, Bessac was part of a group mistakenly attacked by Tibetan forces in which Central Intelligence Agency officer Douglas Mackiernan was killed, making Mackiernan the CIA's first agent killed in action.

== Biography ==
Bessac was born on January 13, 1922, in Lodi, California and earned his undergraduate degree at the College of the Pacific, where he majored in history. He received a Master of Arts from the University of California, Berkeley and a Ph.D. from the University of Wisconsin–Madison in Anthropology. At COP, he was friends with Dave Brubeck, a pioneer of jazz music and he played tackle for football coach Amos Alonzo Stagg.

He enlisted in the United States Army during World War II. After studying Chinese language at Cornell University, Bessac was sent by the OSS to Kunming, China, as a paratrooper, where he served until 1947. He then worked with the OSS and the United States Department of State, finalizing the surrender of Japan and providing relief aid to Mongols. After completing service with the OSS, he studied language at Fujen University in present-day Beijing and was awarded a Fulbright scholarship.

The CIA hired him when it was formed in 1947, but Bessac left after realizing that working for CIA would prevent him from scholarships to pursue his studies of Classical Chinese Philosophy and Mongolia. In the Gobi Desert studying anthropology in Inner Mongolia, Bessac was forced to flee in the wake of advancing Chinese Communist forces and embarked on a journey of 2,000 miles (3,200 km) to Tihwa (now known as Ürümqi) in Second East Turkestan Republic or Xinjiang Province, Republic of China and from there through Tibet and across the Himalayas to India.

After crossing the Changtang, Bessac's group was mistakenly attacked by a group of Tibetan border guards, who shot and killed three members of his group before Bessac ran towards the soldiers while carrying a white flag. Among the dead was Vice Counsel and CIA agent Douglas Mackiernan, who had monitored actions by the Soviet Union in the area around the border between East Turkestan and the Kazakh Soviet Socialist Republic, near the location where the Soviets had conducted their initial nuclear bomb test in August 1949. The Tibetan troops who had been involved in the attack that led to Mackiernan's death were convicted by a military court in Lhasa and sentenced to mutilation, with the leader of the group "to have his nose and both ears cut off", though after Bessac intervened for leniency, the punishment was changed so that the leader received 200 lashes and the other members of the patrol were also lashed.

After he arrived back in the United States, the Communist Chinese invaded Tibet. Bessac enrolled at University of California, Berkeley and married a fellow graduate student, Susanne Leppmann. He completed his doctorate at the University of Wisconsin–Madison following field research in Taiwan on land reform. After a few years at Lawrence University, Bessac joined the faculty of University of Montana. Dr. Bessac had severe closed angle glaucoma that rendered him almost completely blind in his later years. He died at the age of 88 on December 6, 2010, in Missoula, Montana, due to a stroke. He was survived by Susanne, as well as by four daughters, a son, eight grandchildren and two step-grandchildren.
