= Tibetan Uprising Day =

Commemoration of the 10 March 1959 Tibetan uprising

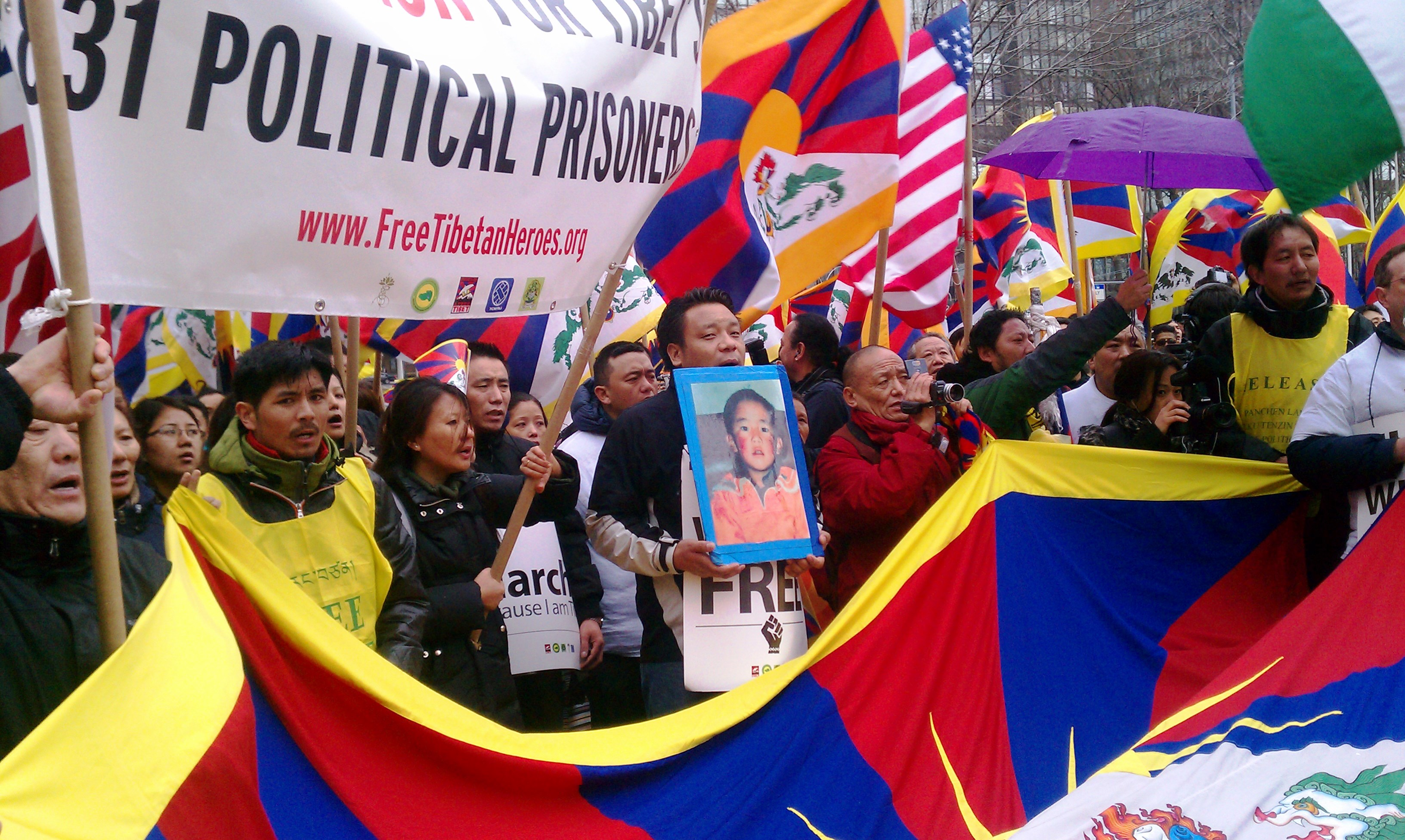
Tibetans and supporters protest against China for political prisoners at UN in NYC on March 10, Tibetan Uprising Day.

Tibetan Uprising Day, observed on March 10, commemorates the 1959 Tibetan uprising which began on March 10, 1959, and the Women's Uprising Day of March 12, 1959, involving thousands of women, against the presence of the People's Republic of China in Tibet.

The armed rebellion was quashed by the Chinese army, resulting in a violent crackdown on Tibetan independence movements, tens of thousands of Tibetan deaths, and the escape from China of the temporal and spiritual leader of Tibet, the 14th Dalai Lama, disguised as a soldier, on March 19, 1959. It also put an end to the 1951 Seventeen Point Agreement, a Sino-Tibetan Agreement written by China which had promised to respect and protect “the religious beliefs, customs and habits of the Tibetan people," which was forced on Tibet to avert war. The Dalai Lama refuted the Sino-Tibetan Agreement after he went into exile in India, in April 1959, in Tezpur, by making an announcement in the presence of the international community.

In 2008, on Tibetan Uprising Day, a series of riots and violent clashes broke out in the Tibetan city of Lhasa when monks were arrested during peaceful demonstrations. The events in Lhasa triggered a nationwide uprising in which protests occurred in every region of Tibet. The Central Tibetan Administration estimates that 336 protests occurred in Tibet in 2008. China responded to the uprising by isolating the Tibetan Autonomous Region from the outside world with overwhelming use of violence, resulting in an unknown number of deaths, arrests, disappearances, cultural genocide, and the ongoing repression of Tibetan culture and religion inside Tibetan regions of China. In response, starting in 2009 in accordance with its campaign to disseminate propaganda which portrays its invasion of Tibet as a peaceful liberation, China celebrates Serfs’ Emancipation Day, the anniversary of its bloody repression of the Tibetan uprising in 1959 with a flag raising ceremony and celebrations in Lhasa. China's official journal China Daily reported that "People from all walks of life in the Tibet autonomous region held various activities on Mar 28 to mark anniversary of the liberation of a million serfs."

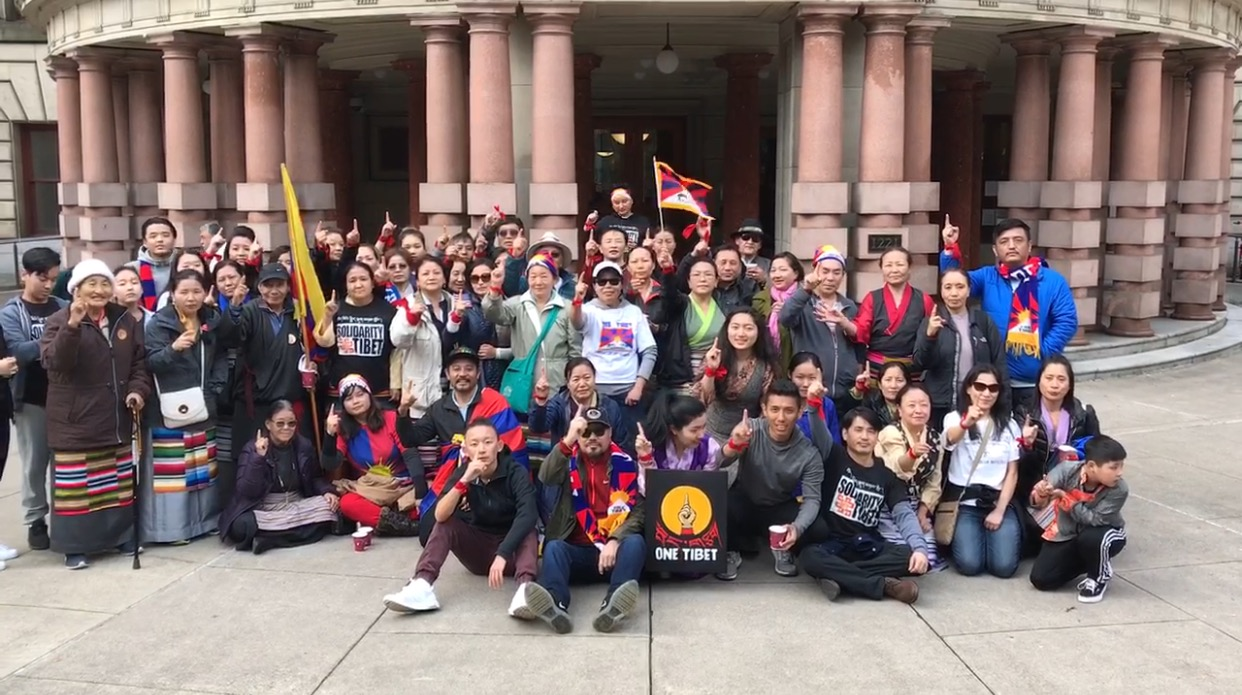
Protestors in Portland, Oregon, on Tibetan Uprising Day

Tibetan Uprising Day is internationally observed by the Tibetan Community, the Sangha, and the Central Tibetan Administration, the Tibetan government in exile; governments, organizations, individual Tibetans and non-Tibetans who support the Tibetan people's struggle for religious and cultural freedom, such as Students for a Free Tibet and the International Campaign for Tibet. Tibetan independence groups organize protests or campaigns on March 10 to draw attention to the situation in Tibet. The commemoration of Tibetan Uprising Day is also accompanied by the release of a statement by the Dalai Lama. Bipartisan United States government support includes a resolution by the Congress of the United States "commemorating the 59th anniversary of Tibet's 1959 uprising as Tibetan Rights Day, and expressing support for the human rights and religious freedom of the Tibetan people and the Tibetan Buddhist faith community." and statements and speeches by politicians

Beijing has regularly been accused of using spying, threats and blackmail against Tibetan exiles in other countries and ‘threatens relatives in Tibet’ to exert control over activists in exile, with greater transnational repression at Tibetan new year," Losar, which falls on or around the same date as Tibetan Uprising Day. China also pressures other countries to suppress Tibetan Uprising Day commemorations and protests. Freedom House, a global watchdog which monitors people's political rights and civil liberties in different geographic areas, regardless of the country they are in, has successively ranked Tibet as the World’s Least-Free Country for the three years the Freedom of the World report has been issued, in 2021, 2022, and 2023.

== Organizations that commemorate the day ==
- Central Tibetan Administration
- United States Congress
- Wisconsin Legislature
- City Government of Kaohsiung
- Students for a Free Tibet
- International Campaign for Tibet

== See also ==
- 1959 Tibetan uprising
- Dalai Lama's escape from China
- 2008 Tibetan unrest
- Serfs Emancipation Day
- Annexation of Tibet by the People's Republic of China
- Buddhism and violence
- Censorship in China
- Chinese censorship abroad
- History of Tibet (1950–present)
- Human rights in China
- Human rights in Tibet
- Labour camps in Tibet
- Penal system in China
- Protests and uprisings in Tibet since 1950
- Racism in China
- Secession in China
- Sinicization of Tibet
- Tibetan independence movement
- Tibetan sovereignty debate
- Antireligious campaigns of the Chinese Communist Party
- Persecution of Buddhists § Tibet
- Anti-Chinese sentiment § Tibet
- List of massacres in China
