= Tibetan festivals =

In Tibet, the Tibetan calendar lags approximately four to six weeks behind the solar calendar. For example, the Tibetan First Month usually falls in February, the Fifth Month usually falls in June or early July and the Eight Month usually falls in September.

== List of traditional Tibetan festivals ==
Month	Date	Festival	Notes
1st Month	1st-7th	New Year Festival Losar	A week-long drama and carnivals, horse races and archery
1st Month	4th-25th	Monlam Prayer Festival	The Great Prayer Festival, a tradition begun by Tsong Khapa. Many pilgrims gather at Jokhang in Lhasa
1st Month	15th	Lantern Festival	Commemorates Buddha's miracle at Sravasti. Fires are lit on roofs, and lamps in windows
2nd Month	28th-29th	-	Festival to drive out evil spirits and expel the scapegoat. Lamas encircle Lhasa with trumpets
4th Month	7th	Pilgrim Festival	Important month for pilgrims. -the birth of Buddha Sakyamuni
4th Month	15th	Saka dawa	Celebrates the birth and Enlightenment of Sakyamuni and his entry to Nirvana. An outdoor opera is held and captured animals released. Worshippers flock to the Jokhang in Lhasa to pray.
5th Month	14th-16th	Hanging of the Thangka	A giant thangka is hung at Tashilhunpo in Shigatse
5th Month	15th	Incense Festival	On this day ghosts are said to prowl. Tibetans dress up and party to drive away the spirits.
5th Month	15th-24th	Sho Dun Festival	Literally, the "Yoghurt Festival." Worship of the Buddha. Picnics and operas are held in parks particularly under the trees at Norbulingka. There are often bonfires at night.
6th Month	4th	Buddha's sermon	A feast is held to commemorate Buddha's first sermon. Pilgrims climb holy mountains such as Chokbori
6th month	6th	Cham-ngyon-wa, or "Old Dance"	Celebrated at the Cho-ne Monastery, representing the souls of the departed.
7th month	beginning	Washing Festival	Lasts about a week. People go to the river to wash themselves and their clothes. Said to cure any sickness.
7th Month	end	Ongkar Festival	Literally 'Looking around the fields'. Ensures a good harvest. Horse-racing, archery contests and opera
7th/8th Month	All	Golden Star Festival	The Golden Star festival is held to wash away passion, greed and jealousy and to abandon ego. Ritual bathing in rivers takes place and picnics are held
8th Month	1st-10th	Dajyur Festival	The Dayjur is held in Gyantse and Damxung -horse racing and light hearted sports competitions and games takes places
8th Month	1st-7th	Harvest Festival	The festival is held with prayers, dancing, singing and drinking
8th Month	14th-16th	Buddha painting unfolding festival	Lamas unfold large thangkas on walls and mountains.
9th Month	22nd	-	Buddha's descent from heaven after preaching to his mother is commemorated. All monasteries are opened and pilgrims gather
10th Month	25th	Tsong Khapa memorial	Memorial festival of Tsong Khapa's death - fires are lit on the roofs of the monasteries and lamps are lit
12th Month	1st-7th	New Year Festival	New Year Festival in Shigatse
12th Month	5th-6th	Meeting of the Eight Guardians	The Meeting of the Eight Guardians and demons where Tibetans stay indoors to avoid evil outside
12th Month	29th	Banishing Evil Spirits	A "Devil Dance" is held to drive out all evil from the Old Year to prepare for New Year.

== Losar ==
The Tibetan calendar is a lunisolar calendar. Losar is celebrated on the first three days of the first lunar month.

== Gallery ==
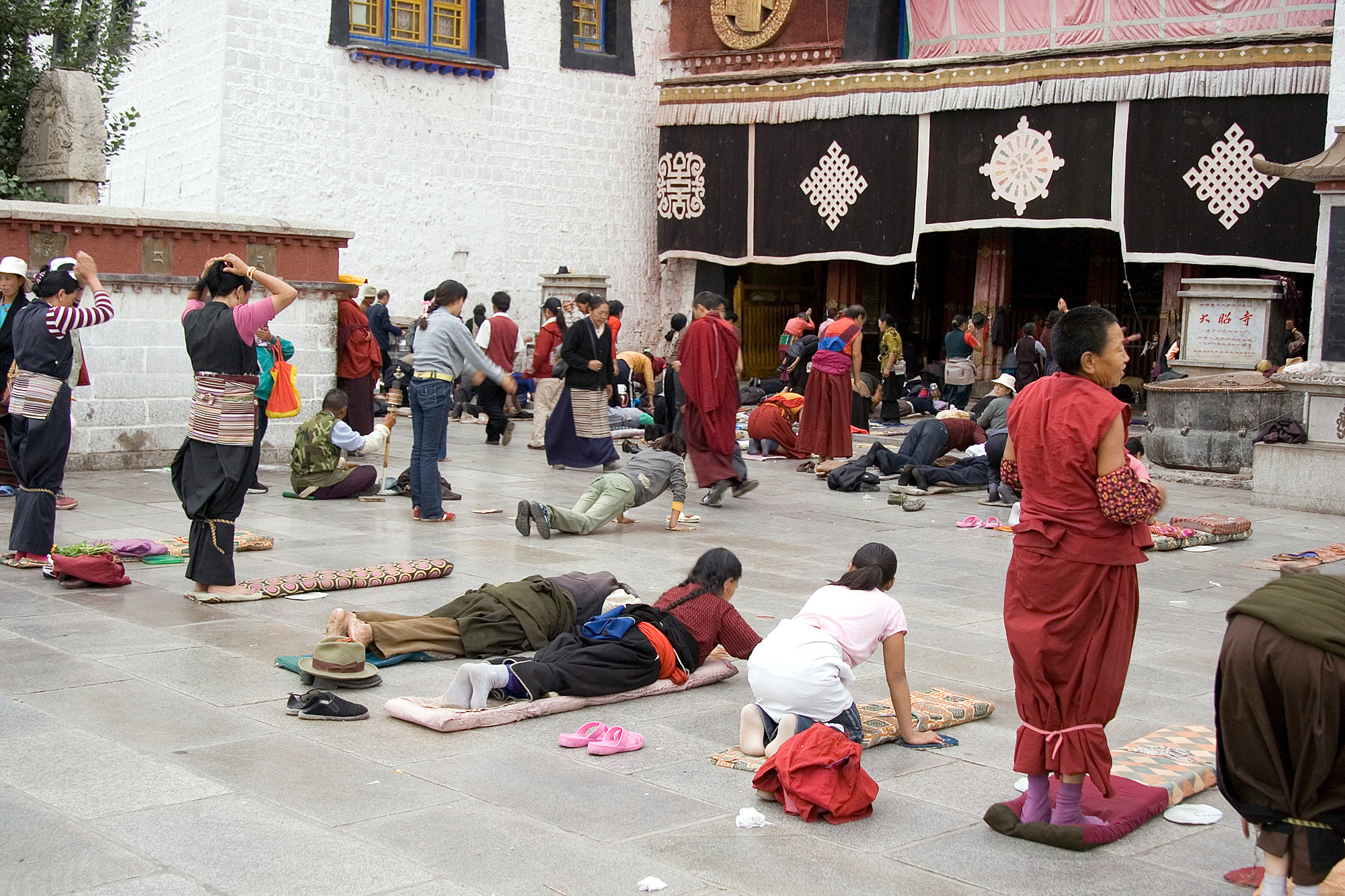
Pilgrims at Jokhang, Lhasa during Monlam

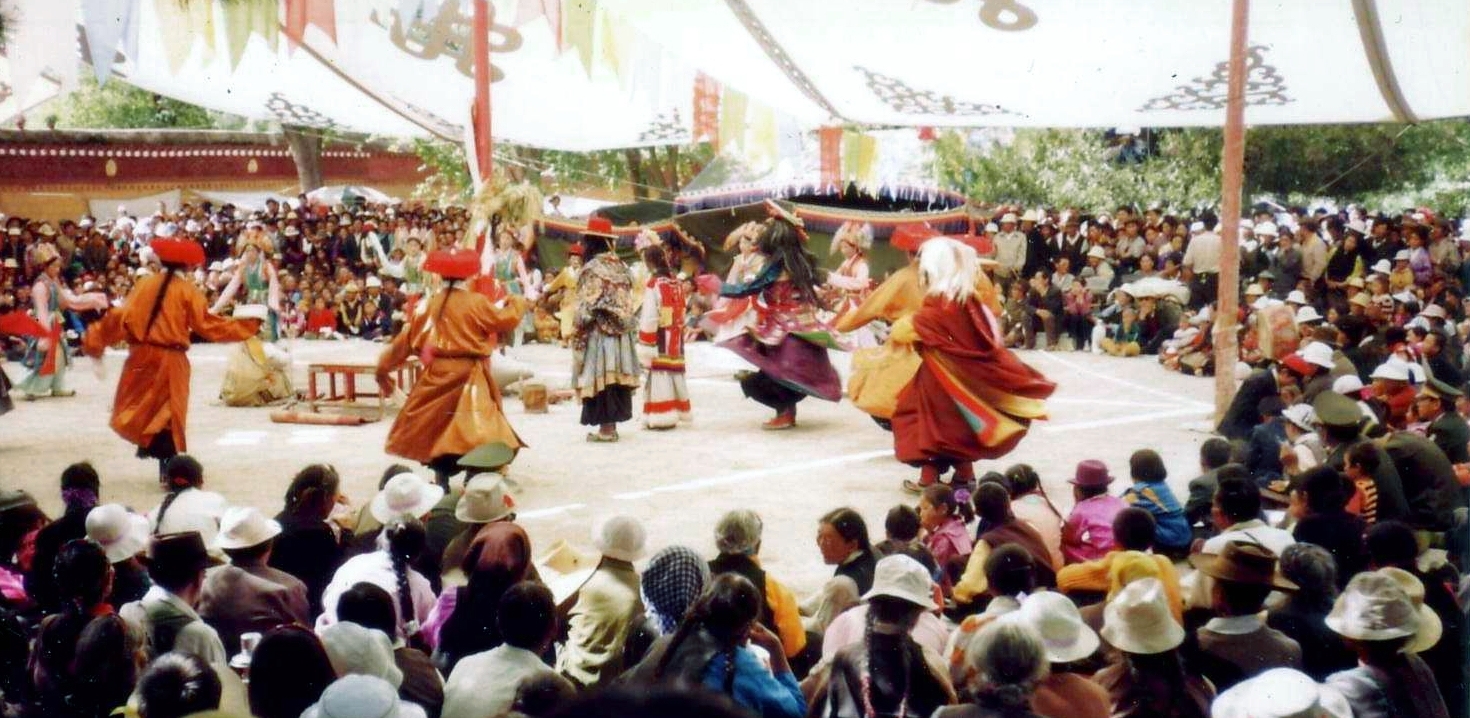
Dancing at Sho Dun Festival, Norbulingka, 1993

== See also ==
- Traditional games of Tibet
- List of festivals in Asia
