= Culture of Buddhism =

Cultural elements in Buddhism

Buddhist culture is exemplified through Buddhist art, Buddhist architecture, Buddhist music and Buddhist cuisine. As Buddhism expanded from the Indian subcontinent it adopted artistic and cultural elements of host countries in other parts of Asia.

== Features ==
=== In economics ===
Economics, understood as the organization of work life and the means by which production needs are met, forms an integral part of any culture, including Buddhist culture. Buddhist economics does not aim to maximize consumption, but rather to promote human well-being through a simple, purposeful, and dutiful life, in which right livelihood is emphasized. It encourages people to remain true to their cultural and spiritual heritage, avoiding materialistic pursuits. Mechanized or repetitive work that deprives individuals of meaningful engagement is discouraged, while excessive leisure is also seen as incompatible with a mindful and balanced life. In critiquing conventional economic measures such as Gross Domestic Product (GDP), Schumacher observed that if a woman stays home to care for her children, her contribution is not counted in national economic output, whereas paid work outside the home is recorded as economic gain. He used this example to illustrate how unpaid, socially necessary labor is undervalued, rather than to critique women's participation in the workforce. Buddhist economics advocates for systems that recognize and support meaningful, compassionate, and socially beneficial work, both paid and unpaid.

Like language, religion has also divided the people of South Asia. The major religions in the subcontinent are Hinduism, Islam, Sikhism, Buddhism, and Christianity. Strong Indian, Chinese, Burmese, and other Southeast Asian influences are still evident in traditional Thai culture. Buddhism, Animism, and Westernization also play a significant role in shaping the culture. Three major forces have influenced the development of Buddhism in Thailand. The most visible influence is that of the Theravada school of Buddhism, imported from Sri Lanka.

=== In healthcare ===
For Buddhism, mental health is of supreme importance, and individuals must strive towards improving this by practicing non-violence and refraining from sexual misconduct and lying. However, Buddhist traditions do acknowledge physical ill-being. Pain and suffering are inevitable like death, for which taking any form of medication is not prohibited. The medicines taken should not be intoxicating or affect the clarity of mind in any way. Any physical ill-being must be endured with patience and steadfastness, as any form of physical suffering allows time for self-reflection and spiritual progress. The best way to cure a disease is to improve one's diet by practicing vegetarianism, reflective of the non-violent way of living. Buddhism also places great stress on fasting on special days which helps revitalize the physical and spiritual being. Any form of organ transplant has been viewed as a supreme form of generosity as well.

=== In art ===
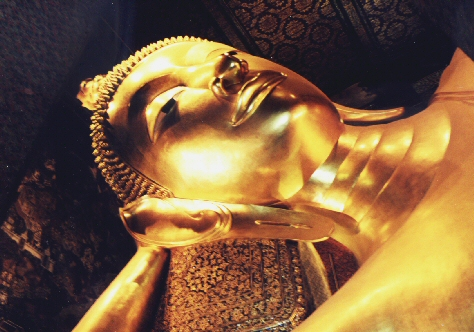
Reclining Buddha in Wat Pho, Bangkok

Buddhist art originated in the Indian subcontinent in the centuries following the life of the historical Gautama Buddha in the 6th to 5th century BCE, before evolving through its contact with other cultures and its diffusion through the rest of Asia and the world. A first, essentially Indian, aniconic phase (avoiding direct representations of the Buddha), was followed from around the 1st century CE by an iconic phase (with direct representations of the Buddha). From that time, Buddhist art diversified and evolved as it adapted to the new countries where the faith was expanding. It developed to the north through Central Asia and into Eastern Asia to form the Northern branch of Buddhist art, and to the east as far as Southeast Asia to form the Southern branch of Buddhist art. In India, Buddhist art flourished and even influenced the development of Hindu art, until Buddhism almost disappeared around the 10th century with the expansion of Hinduism and Islam.

In the earliest form of Buddhist art, the Buddha was not represented in human form but instead was represented using signs and symbols such as footprints or an empty throne. From the fifth century B.C. to the first century B.C., Indian artists would make scriptures that revolved around the themes of the historical life of the Buddha and the previous lives of the Buddha. The reluctance towards anthropomorphic representations of the Buddha, and the sophisticated development of aniconic symbols to avoid it (even in narrative scenes where other human figures would appear), is believed to be connected 70 Buddha's sayings that disfavoured representations of himself after the extinction of his body. This phase is defined as the aniconic phase of Buddhist art. The iconic phase starts from the 1st century CE whereby the Buddha was given realistic human features and proportions.

=== In architecture ===
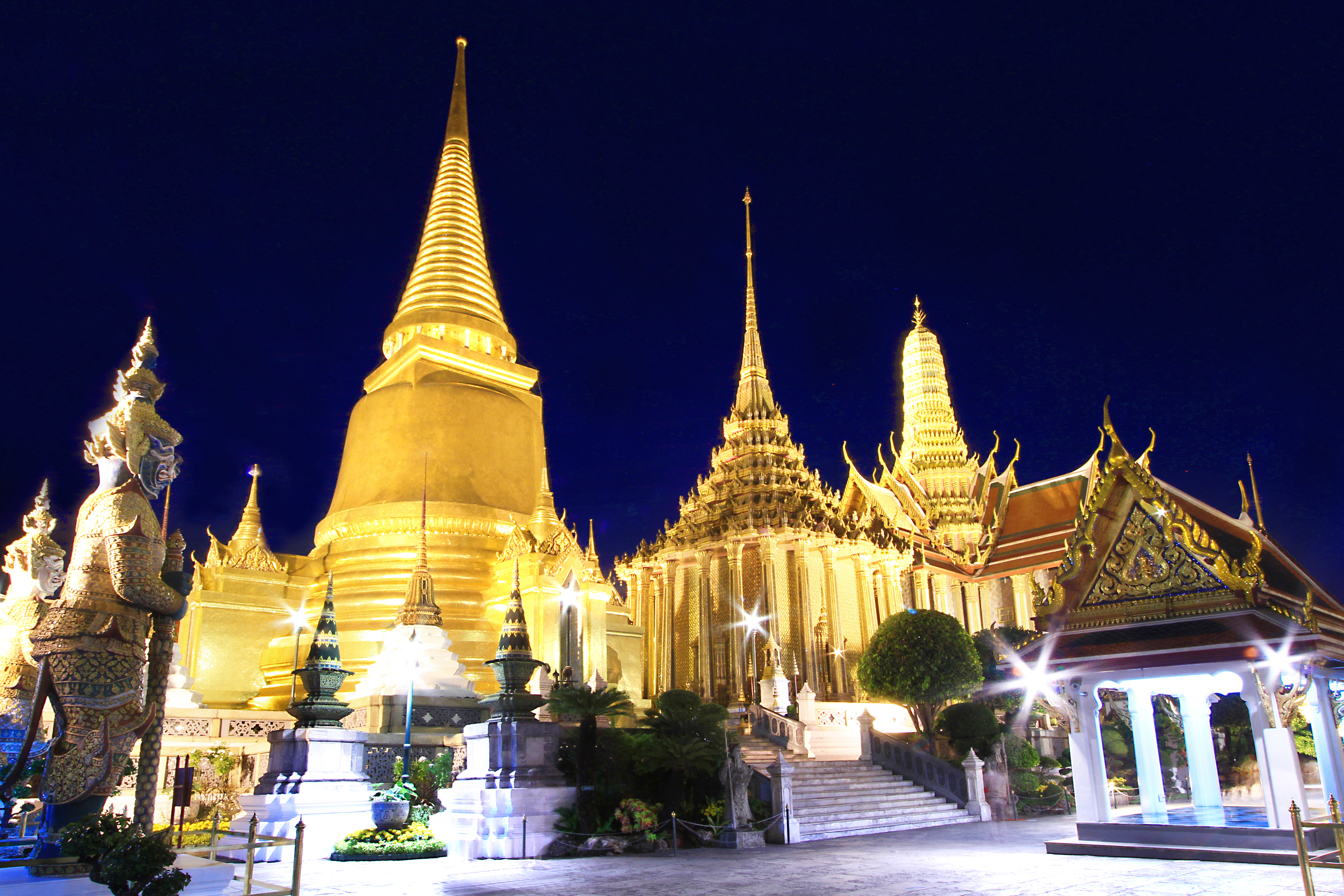
Wat Phra Kaew, Bangkok, Thailand.

Buddhist religious architecture most notably developed in South Asia in the third century BCE.

Two types of structures are associated with early Buddhism: stupas and viharas. The initial function of a stupa was the veneration and safe-guarding of the relics of the Buddha. The earliest existing example of a stupa is in Sanchi (Madhya Pradesh). In accordance with changes in religious practice, stupas were gradually incorporated into chaitya-grihas (stupa halls). These reached their high point in the first century BCE, exemplified by the cave complexes of Ajanta and Ellora (Maharashtra). Viharas were developed to accommodate the growing and increasingly formalized Buddhist monasticism. An existing example is at Nālandā, (Bihar).

The beginnings of the Buddhist school of architecture can be traced back to B.C. 255 when the Mauryan emperor Asoka established Buddhism as the state religion of his large empire and encouraged the use of architectural monuments to spread Buddhism in different places.

Buddhism, which is also the first Indian religion to require large communal and monastic spaces, inspired three types of architecture; the first is the stupa, a significant object in Buddhist art and architecture. The Stupas hold the most important place among all the earliest Buddhist sculptures. On a very basic level, the Stupa is a burial mound for the Buddha. The original stupas contained the Buddha's ashes. Stupas are dome-shaped monuments, used to house Buddhists' relics or to commemorate significant facts of Buddhism.

The second type of architecture unique to Buddhism is the Vihara, a Buddhist monastery that also contains a residence hall for the monks. The third type is the chaitya, an assembly hall that contains a stupa (without relics). The central hall of the chaitya is arranged to allow for circumambulation of the stupa within it.

=== In music and chant ===
Buddhist music prominently includes Honkyoku, Buddhist chant, and Shomyo. Honkyoku are the pieces of shakuhachiyoku for enlightenment and alms as early as the 13th century.

Buddhist chant is the chant used in or inspired by Buddhism, including many genres in many cultures. It includes:

- Paritta chanting, practice of reciting certain scriptural verses in Theravada Buddhism
- Fanbai in Chinese Buddhism
- Repetition of the name of Amitābha in Pure Land Buddhism.
- Shomyo in Japanese Tendai and Shingon Buddhism.
- Throat singing in Tibetan Buddhist chant (one aspect of Tibetan Buddhist music)

Musical chanting, most often in Tibetan or Sanskrit, is an integral part of the religion. These chants are complex, often recitations of sacred texts or in celebration of various festivals. Yang chanting, performed without metrical timing, is accompanied by resonant drums and low, sustained syllables.

Shomyo (声明) is a style of Japanese Buddhist chant; mainly in the Tendai and Shingon sects. There are two styles: ryokyoku and rikkyoku, described as difficult and easy to remember, respectively.

Fanbai (梵唄, lit: "the speech of Brahmā") is a style of Buddhist ritual chanting in Chinese Buddhism. Vocal performances of the liturgy can be classified into several different categories, namely: nian (念, lit: "recitation"), song (誦, 'it: "chanting") and chang (唱, lit: "singing"). During performances, sūtras are usually read on a single note with a regular beat that may progressively speed up, mantras and dhāraṇīs are chanted, and gathas of praises are sung on a regular metric form with the use of melodies composed from precise pitches.

Many ritual musical instruments are used in association with Buddhist practice including singing bowls, bells, tingsha, drums, cymbals, wind instruments and others.

The relationship between Buddhism and music is thought to be complicated since the association of music with earthly desires led early Buddhists to condemn the musical practice, and even observation of musical performance, for monks and nuns. However, in Pure Land Buddhism Buddhist paradises are represented as musical places in which Buddhist law takes the form of melodies. Most Buddhist practices also involve chanting in some form, and some also make use of instrumental music and even dance. Music can act as an offering to the Buddha, as a means of memorizing Buddhist texts, and as a form of personal cultivation or meditation.

In order to purify the hearts of listeners, Buddhist melodies are strong yet soft and pure. Buddhist music plays a central role in everyday cultural practices of Buddhists since it is also played in many ceremonies such as weddings and funerals

Buddhist music developed when Buddhism spread to Tibet. The Tibetan traditions of Buddhism encouraged the use of song and dance in certain ceremonies. A wide variety of instruments such as specialized types of drums, windpipes, spiral conches, and trumpets were used in larger ceremonies.

Hymns are commonly used in the Buddhist culture in ceremonies for making offerings or inviting the presence of Buddha and Bodhisattvas. Buddhist hymns express the five virtuous qualities that are sincerity, elegance, clarity, depth, and equanimity and it is believed that regularly listening to Buddhist hymns or fanbei can give the following five graces: a reduction in physical fatigue, less confusion and forgetfulness, a reduction in mental fatigue, greater eloquence, and greater ease in expression and communication. Therefore, in the practice of Buddhism, hymns or fanbei have an important role in daily living, for example in repentance ceremonies. They are not designed to try to elevate or excite the emotions of participants or practitioners, but in fact aim to help conserve emotional energy, calm thinking, lessen desire, and allow practitioners to see their true nature with clarity.

=== In cuisine ===
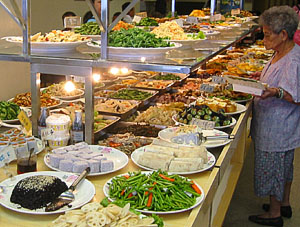
A vegetarian restaurant in Taipei, Taiwan serving Buddhist cuisine in buffet style.

Buddhist cuisine is a kind of cuisine mainly for the believers of Buddhism. It is known as zhāi cài (zhāi means "purification" or "discipline", cai means "cuisine" or "vegetable") in China, and shōjin ryōri (shōjin means "devotion", ryōri means "cuisine") in Japan, and by many other names in other countries. Due to the understanding of animals as conscious and suffering beings, many Buddhists do not kill animals and many also do not eat meat (other than that from those who died naturally, and from species where the consumption of brethren is not troubling to the still living). Certain major Mahayana sutras show the Buddha forcefully denouncing meat-consumption and advocating vegetarianism (vegetarianism in Buddhism). Buddhist vegetarian chefs have become extremely creative in imitating meat using prepared wheat gluten, also known as "seitan" or "wheat meat", soy (such as tofu or tempeh), agar, and other plant products. Some of their recipes are the oldest and most-refined meat analogues in the world.

Buddhism forbids alcohol and other intoxicants because they may result in violations of others of the "Five Moral Precepts": no killing, stealing, sexual misconduct, lying or partaking of intoxicants. In addition, intoxicants cloud the mind and interfere with the concentration needed to achieve enlightenment.

Some Mahāyāna Buddhists and sects in China and Vietnam avoid eating onions, garlic, scallions, chives and leeks, which are known as wu hun (五葷, 'Five Spices'). The spices are said to lead to anger (raw) and passion (cooked), and their odor is also said to repel Gods and attract hungry ghosts and demons.

=== In festivals ===
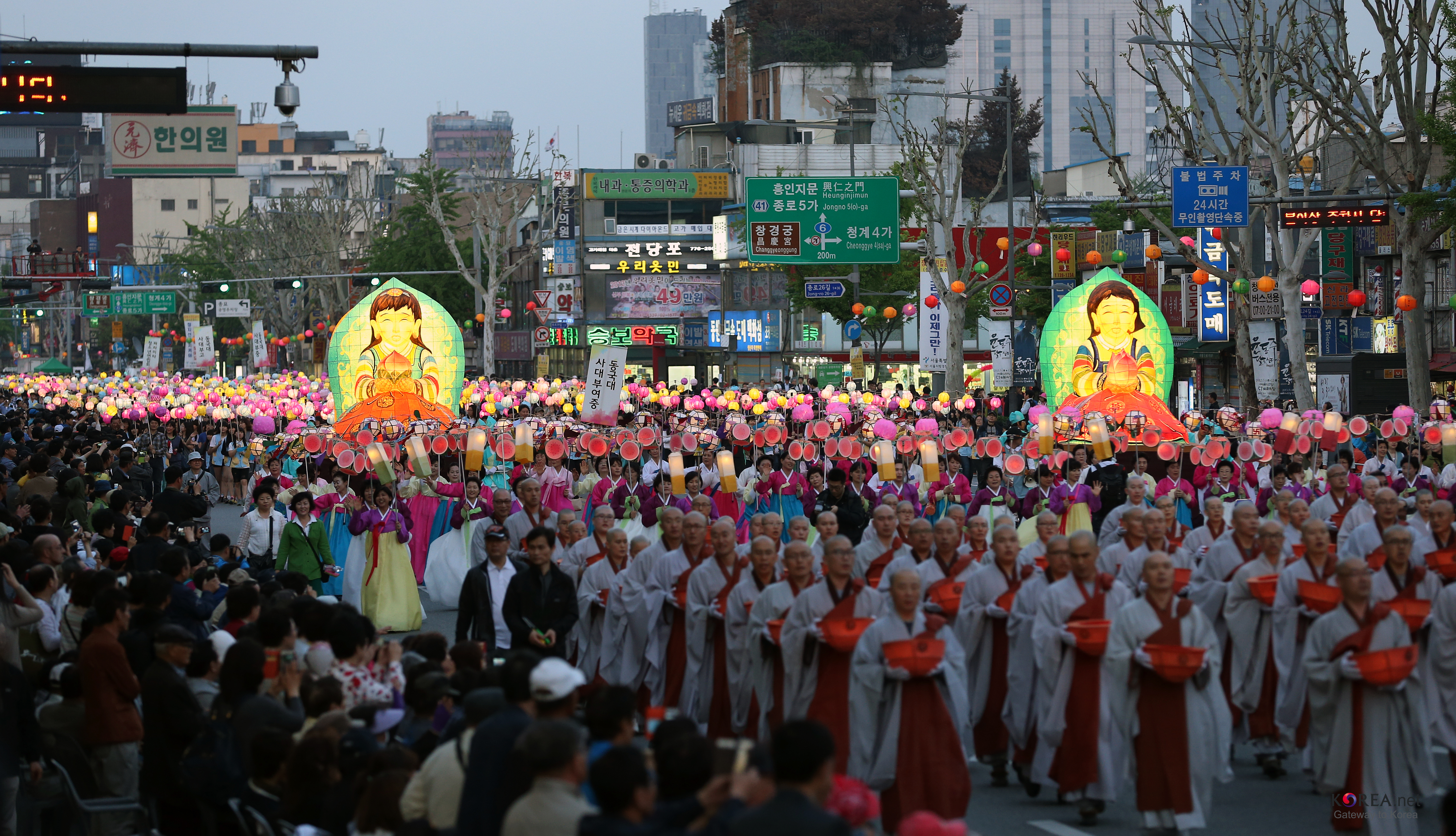
Lotus Lantern Festival (연등회, Yeon Deung Hoe) in Seoul, South Korea.

Japanese festivals and Barua festivals often involve Buddhist culture, as do pagoda festivals held as fairs held at Buddhist temples in Myanmar. Features of Buddhist Tibetan festivals may include the traditional cham dance, which is also a feature of some Buddhist festivals in India and Bhutan. Many festivals of Nepal are religious festivals involving Buddhism, as are many Burmese traditional festivals. Lunar New Year festivals of Buddhist countries in East, South and Southeast Asia include some aspects of Buddhist culture, however, they are considered cultural festivals as opposed to religious ones.

== See also ==
- Art and architecture of Japan
- Buddharupa (religious statues)
- Buddhism and society
- Buddhist calendar
- Buddhist councils
- Thangka (religious paintings)
