= Heortology =

Science of rituals and celebrations

Heortology or eortology is a science that deals with the origin and development of religious festivals, and more specifically the study of the history and criticism of liturgical calendars and martyrologies.

== Etymology ==
The noun eortology comes from the ancient Greek compound of the term ἑορτή "feast" and the suffix -logia which means "study". Thus, eortology is the study of festivals, especially their history and meaning in the church year.

== History ==
Christian heortology dates back at least to Johann Adam Trummerer's Eortologia Anagrammaike published in 1607.

German Lutheran theologian Michael Lilienthal published a German-language heortology in 1724 to show the origin of Christian celebrations. Wilhelm Dibelius published the second eortological study of the Christian rite in German in 1841. In parallel with modern archaeology, studies also examined the question of the rites of Greek and Roman antiquity, following the work of August Mommsen, published in Leipzig in 1864 under the title of Heortologie: Antiquarische Untersuchungen über die städtischen Feste der Athener.

Christian heortology particularly developed at the instigation of the Jesuit Nikolaus Nilles and the liturgical movement from the end of the 19th century. Prominent heortologists were the Sulpician Pierre Batiffol who published History of the Roman Breviary in 1893, Hartmann Grisar who published Analecta Romana in 1899, and the canon Louis Duchesne who published studies on the Origins of Christian worship. German scholar Karl Adam Heinrich Kellner published Heortologie, oder, das Kirchenjahr und die Heiligenfeste in ihrer geschichtlichen Entwicklung in Freiburg im Breisgau in 1901.

As the Second Ecumenical Vatican Council approached, many heortologists published major works, such as Missarum Sollemnia: Genetic Explanation of the Roman Mass by the Jesuit Josef Andreas Jungmann, published first in German in 1948. At the same time, Mircea Eliade focused on the importance of religious thought on contemporary society through his heortological studies of primitive religions.

== Relations with other sciences ==
Heortology is related to many other disciplines such as social anthropology, astronomy, history and liturgy.

=== Anthropology ===
Heortology has considerable importance in anthropology, as it associates time cycles with civilizations and civilizational patterns. Sociology, with Émile Durkheim as its precursor, raises the question of the importance of religion and, in particular, of religious celebrations, in society.

Anthropological philosophy questions the link that exists between collective celebrations and individual questions and fears. To what extent is the general perception of truths reflected in cults, rites and customs? A precursor of this problematic was Johan Huizinga with his book Homo Ludens. The study of the feasts that narrate the life of a saint or other character is of paramount importance, both from a philosophical and sociological point of view.

=== Agriculture ===
Since agriculture was an important determinant of the sustainability of most ancient civilizations and is heavily influenced by annual cycles, it is normally heortology relies on the sciences of agriculture to explain the recurrence of the festivities.

=== Astronomy ===
Heortology is also based on notions of astronomy. Certain festivities move over the years, either because they are linked to the cycles of the lunar evolution, or because they take into account the year of 360 days, i.e. 365 days, without counting the hours of difference between the complete return of the Earth around the Sun and revolutions around it.

Other cyclic temporal recurrence patterns have been found, such as the changing phases of Venus relative to Earth, influencing the timing of certain festivities.

=== History ===
Heortology also relies on the science of history to understand the origin and evolution of rituals. A festival is generally a re-enactment of a solemn, legendary or real act. Thus, ancient civilizations commemorate as the victory of a hero over a serpent-god, or the betrothal of the Earth to the Sun while for Christians, Easter is the solemn celebration of the resurrection of Jesus Christ.

=== Liturgy ===
Heortology, which is closely related to the liturgy itself, contributes to the importance of the latter in dogmatic and disciplinary dissertations.
