= Religious festival =

Time of special importance marked by adherents of some religion

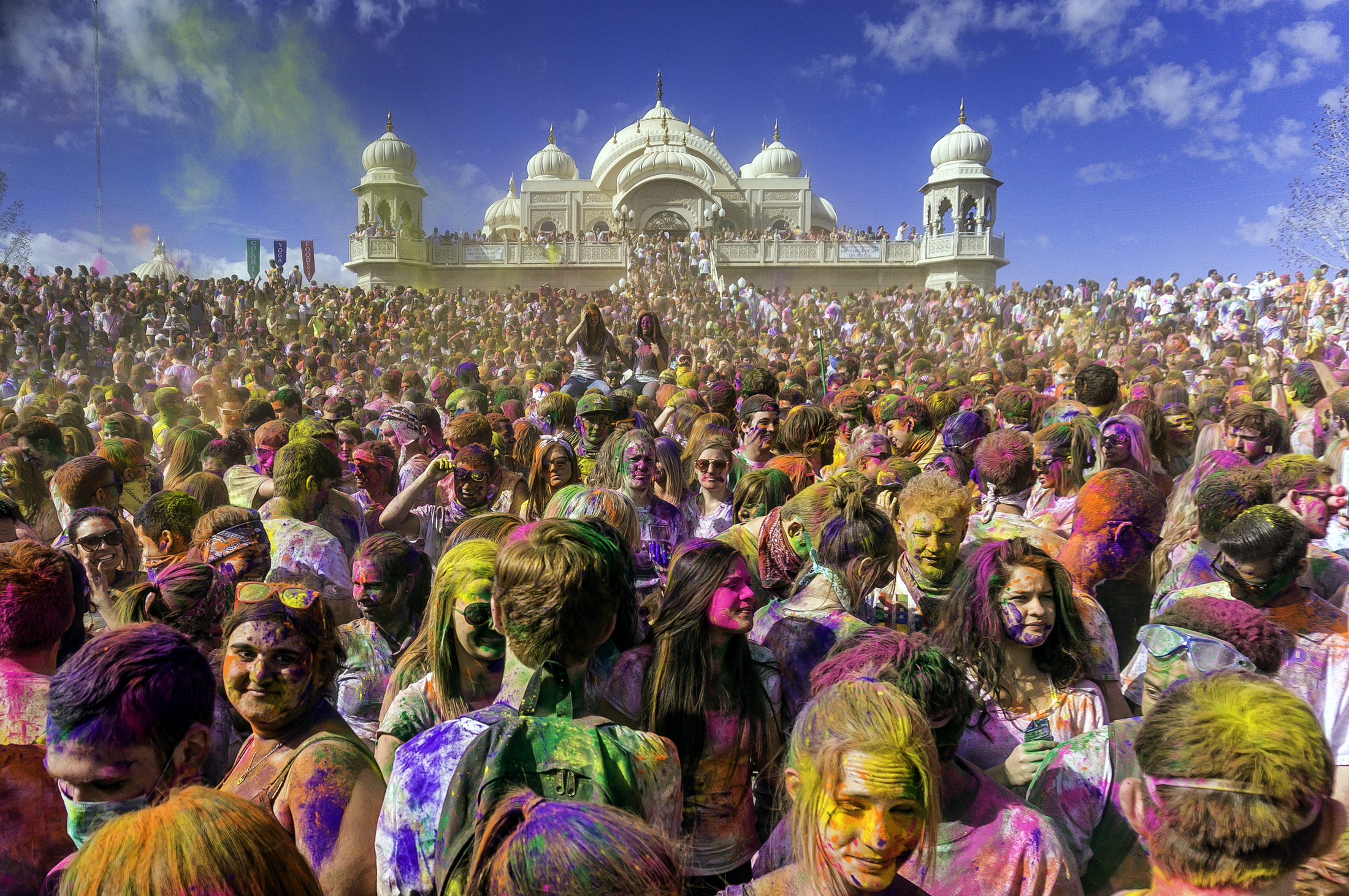
Celebration of the Hindu festival of Holi at Sri Sri Radha Krishna Temple in Utah, United States

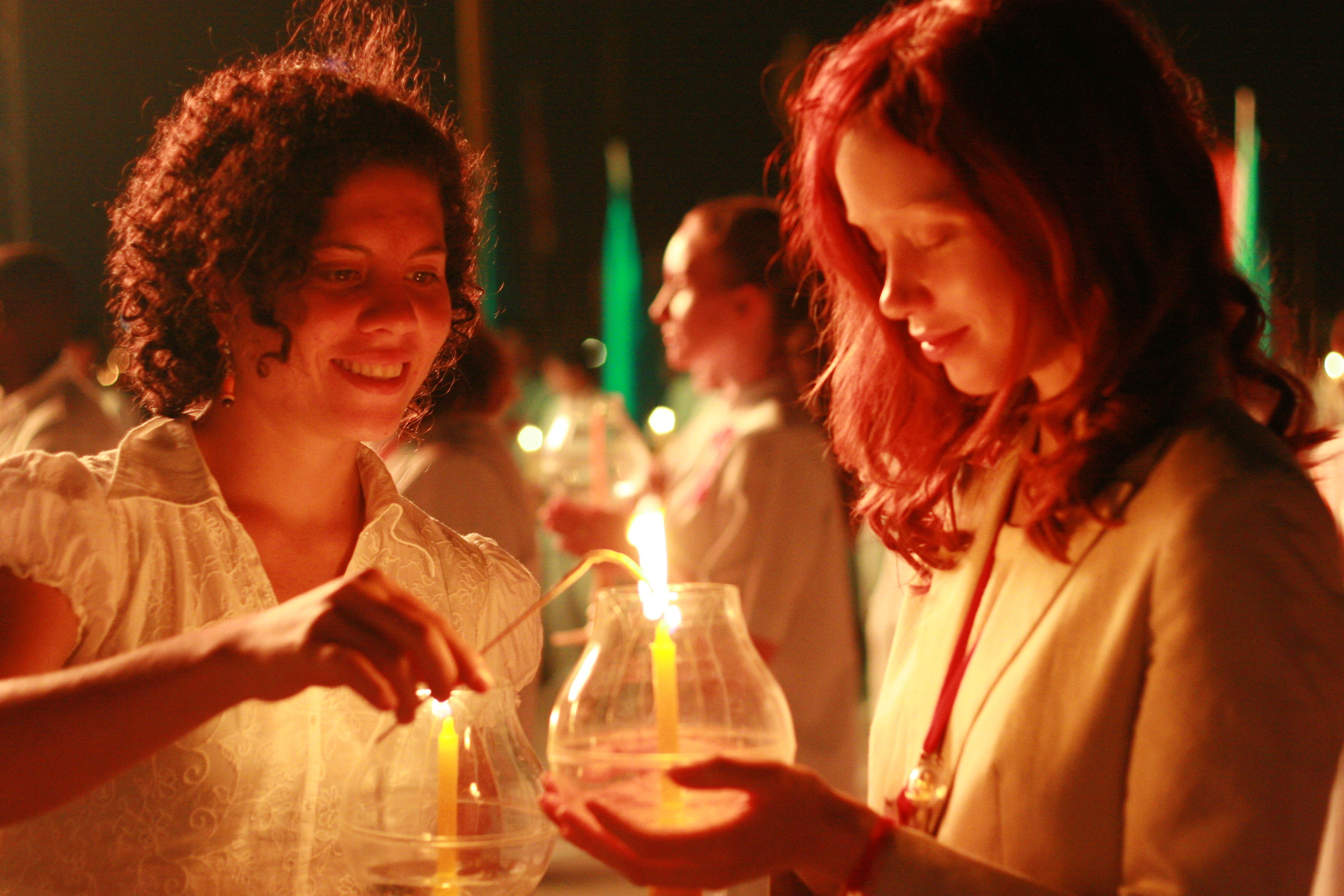
Buddhist festival of Magha Puja celebration held in Thailand.

A religious festival is a time of special importance marked by adherents to that religion. Religious festivals are commonly celebrated on recurring cycles in a calendar year or lunar calendar. The science of religious rites and festivals is known as heortology.

Within the Evangelical Lutheran branch of Christianity, "festival" is part of the ranking of feast days in the liturgical kalendar.

== Ancient Roman ==
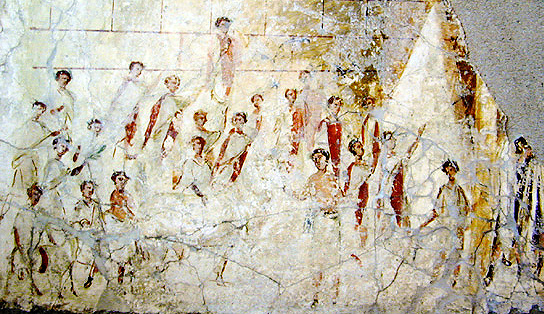
Roman men thought to be participating in the Compitalia festival, in a wall painting from Pompeii

Festivals (feriae) were an important part of Roman religious life during both the Republican and Imperial eras, and were one of the primary features of the Roman calendar. Feriae ("holidays" in the sense of "holy days") were either public (publicae) or private (privatae). State holidays were celebrated by the Roman people and received public funding. Feriae privatae were holidays celebrated in honor of private individuals or by families.

The 1st-century BC scholar Varro defined feriae as "days instituted for the sake of the gods." A deity's festival often marked the anniversary (dies natalis, "birthday") of the founding of the deity's temple, or a rededication after a major renovation. Public business was suspended for the performance of religious rites on the feriae. Cicero says that people who were free should not engage in lawsuits and quarrels, and slaves should get a break from their labors. On calendars of the Republic and early Empire, the religious status days were marked by letters such as F (for fastus), and N (for nefastus, when political activities and the administration of justice were prohibited). By the late 2nd century AD, extant calendars no longer show these letters, probably as a result of calendar reforms undertaken by Marcus Aurelius that recognized the changed religious environment of the empire.

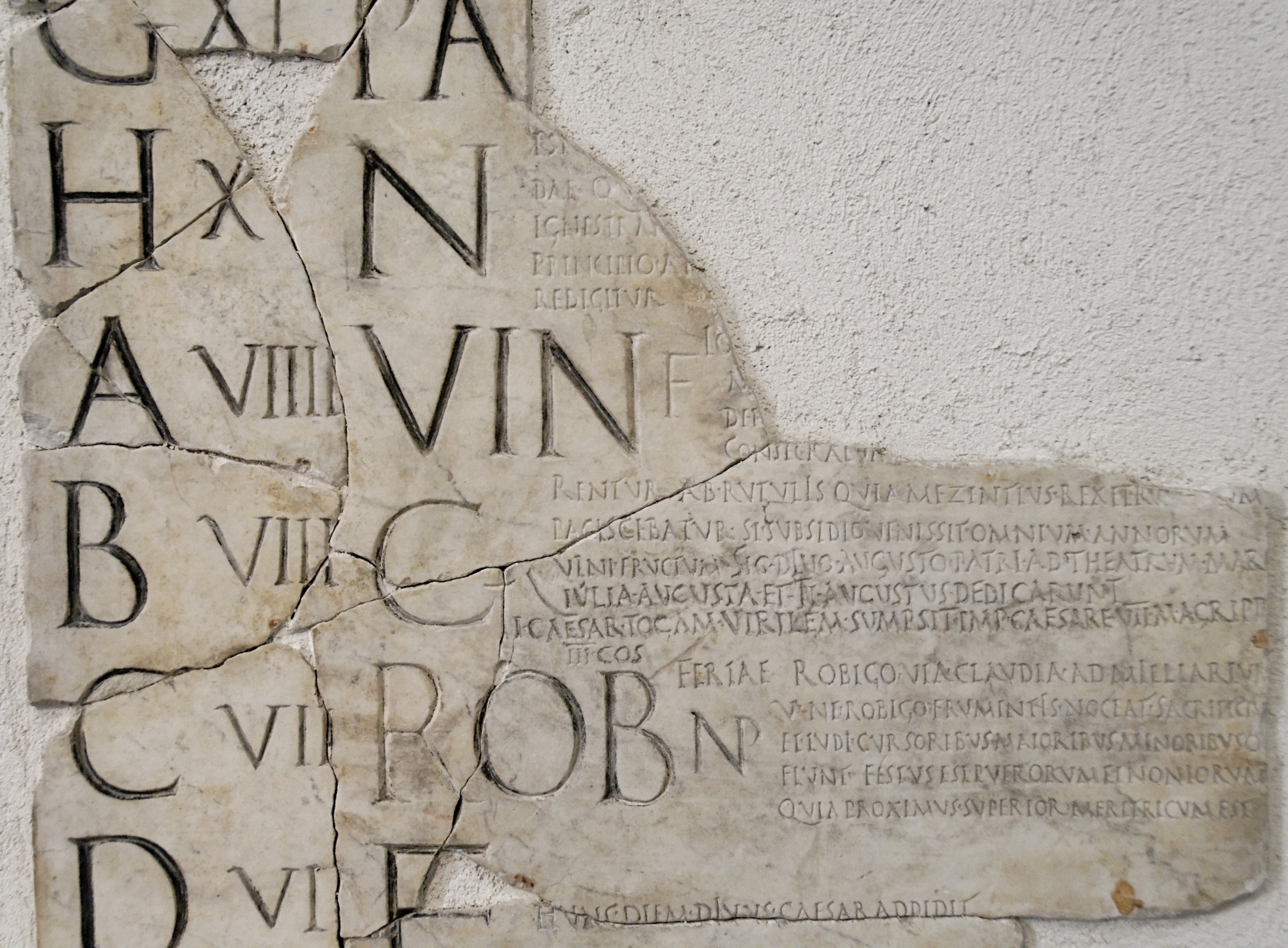
A fragment of the Fasti Praenestini for April (Aprilis), with the festivals of Vinalia (VIN) and Robigalia (ROB) marked in capital letters

On surviving Roman calendars, festivals that appear in large capital letters (such as the Lupercalia and Parilia) are thought to have been the most ancient holidays, becoming part of the calendar before 509 BC. Some of the oldest festivals are not named for deities. During the Imperial period, several traditional festivals localized at Rome became less important, and the birthdays and anniversaries of the emperor and his family gained prominence as Roman holidays. Games (ludi), such as the Ludi Apollinares, were often dedicated to particular deities, but were not technically feriae, although they might be holidays in the modern sense of days off work (dies festi). After the mid-1st century AD, there were more frequent spectacles and games (circenses) held in the venue called a "circus", in honor of various deities or for imperial anniversaries (dies Augusti). A religious festival held on a single day, such as the Floralia, might be expanded with games over multiple days (Ludi Florae); the festival of Flora is seen as a precursor of May Day festivities.

A major source for Roman holidays is Ovid's Fasti, a poem that describes and provides origins for festivals from January to June at the time of Augustus. Because it ends with June, less is known about Roman festivals in the second half of the year, with the exception of the Saturnalia, a religious festival in honor of Saturn on December 17 that expanded with celebrations through December 23. Probably the best-known Roman festival, some of its customs, such as gift-giving and the prevalence of candles, are thought to have influenced popular celebrations of Christmas.

== Buddhist ==
Japanese festivals and Barua festivals often involve Buddhist culture, as do pagoda festivals held as fairs held at Buddhist temples in countries such as Thailand. Features of Buddhist Tibetan festivals may include the traditional cham dance, which is also a feature of some Buddhist festivals in India and Bhutan. Many festivals of Nepal are religious festivals involving Buddhism.

== Christian ==
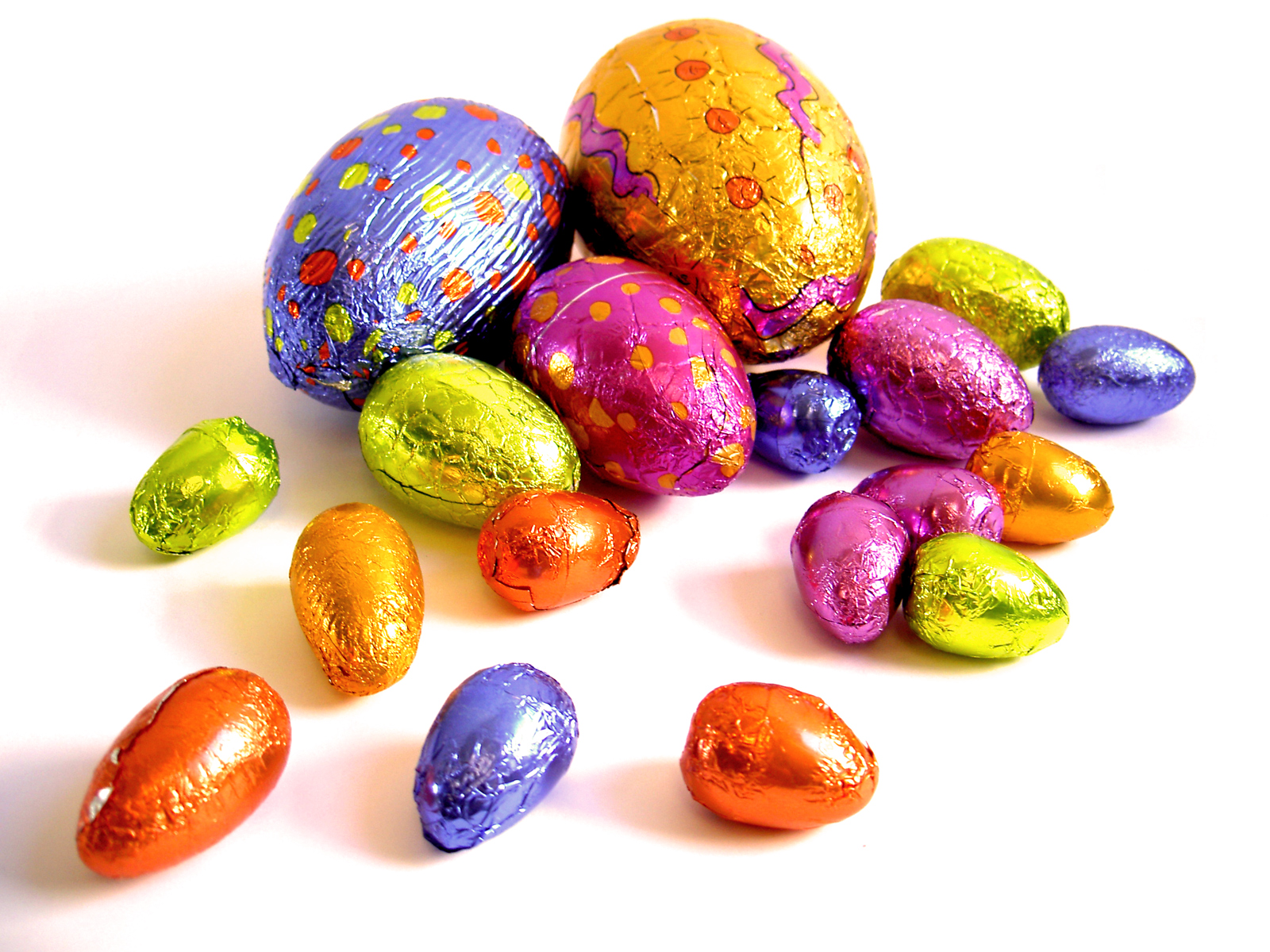
Easter eggs

The central festival of Christianity is Easter, on which Christians celebrate their belief that Jesus Christ rose from the dead on the third day after his crucifixion. Even for Easter, however, there is no agreement among the various Christian traditions regarding the date or manner of the observance, less for Christmas, Pentecost, or various other holidays. Both Protestants and Catholics observe certain festivals commemorating events in the life of Christ, and as well as Eastern Orthodox they often celebrate patronal festivals. Of these, the two most important are Christmas, which commemorates the Birth of Jesus, and Easter, which marks his resurrection.

== Festival of Faiths ==
A celebration of interfaith dialogue, the first Festival of Faiths was held in Louisville, Kentucky, and in 1998, Senator Wendell Ford passed a resolution in the United States Congress "to express the sense of the Senate that the Louisville Festival of Faiths should be commended and should serve as model for similar festivals in other communities throughout the United States." Several cities throughout the United States now host interfaith festivals including Kansas City, Kansas, St Louis, Missouri, Indianapolis, Indiana and Cincinnati, Ohio.

== Hindu ==
'Utsava' is the Sanskrit word for Hindu festivals, meaning 'to cause to grow 'upward'. Hindus observe sacred occasions by festive observances. All festivals in Hinduism are predominantly religious in character and significance. Many festival are seasonal. Some celebrate harvest and the birth of gods or heroes. Some are dedicated to important events in Hindu mythology. Many are dedicated to Shiva and Parvati, Vishnu and Lakshmi and Brahma and Saraswati. A festival may be observed with acts of worship, offerings to deities, fasting, feasting, vigil, rituals, fairs, charity, celebrations, Puja, Homa, aarti etc. They celebrate individual and community life of Hindus without distinction of caste, gender or class. In the Hindu calendar dates are usually prescribed according to the lunar calendar. In vedic timekeeping, a tithi is a lunar day. Among major festivals are Diwali, Gudi Padwa, Pongal, Holi, Ganesh Chaturthi, Raksha Bhandan, Krishna Janmashtami, Dasara or Dussehra, which may refer to the ten days of Sharada Navratri or the tenth day, Vijayadashami. Others include Onam, Shivaratri, Ugadi, Rathayatra of Jagannath at Puri in Ilam, Nepal and many other places in Nepal and many other countries

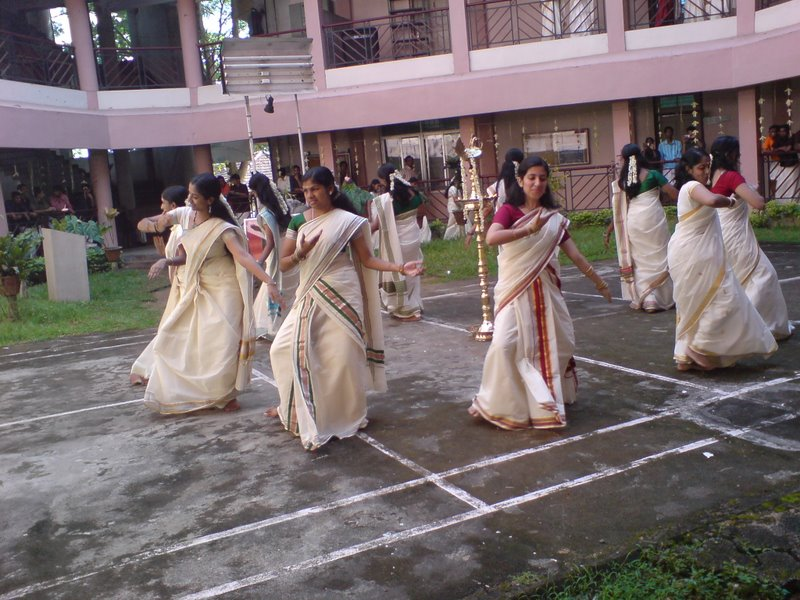

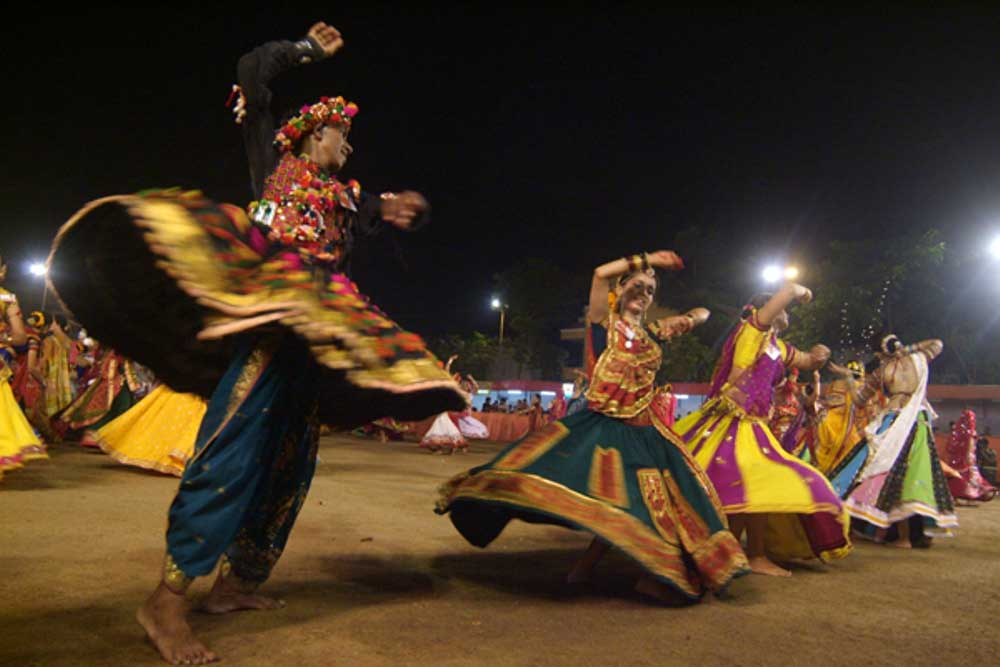

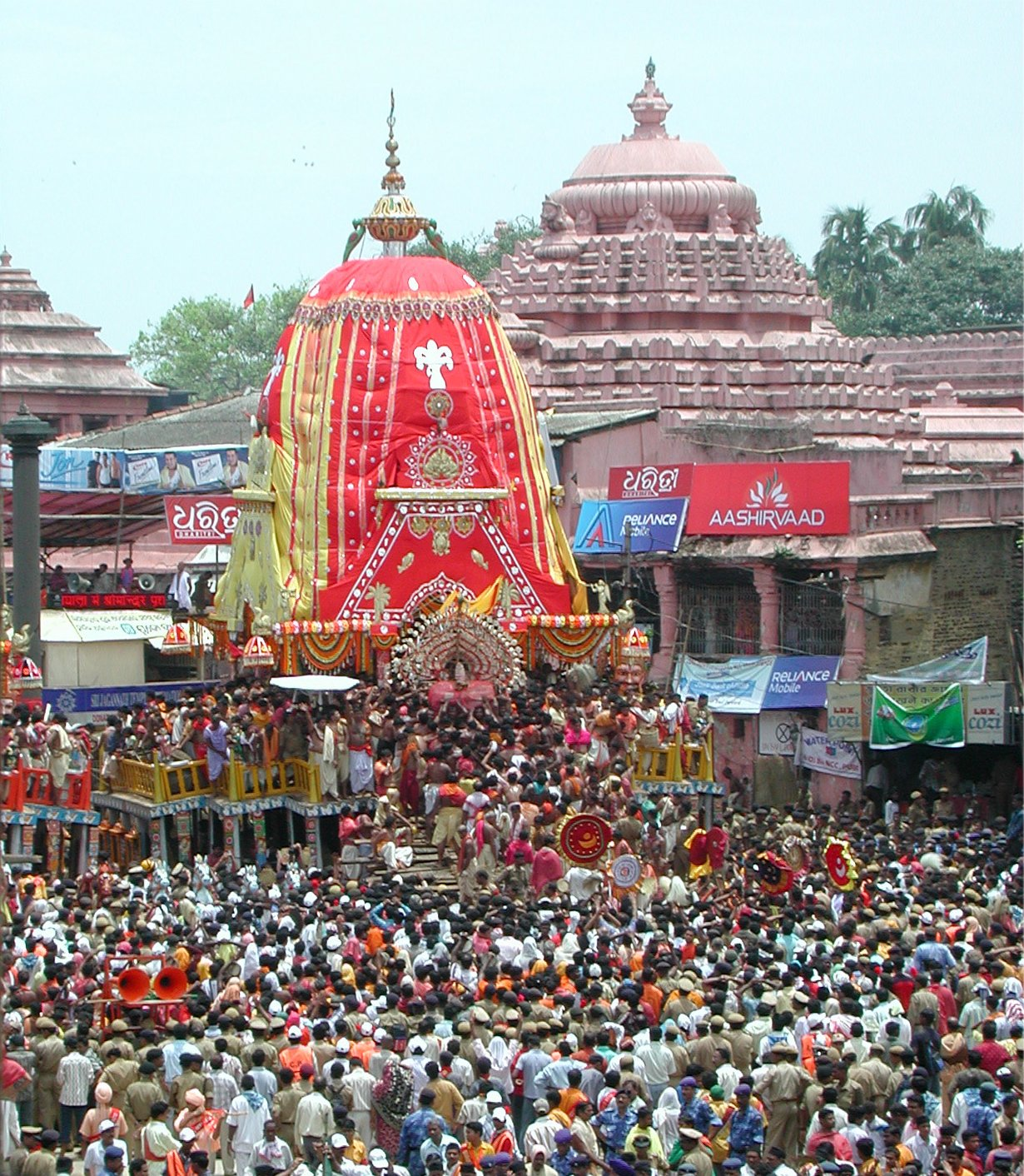

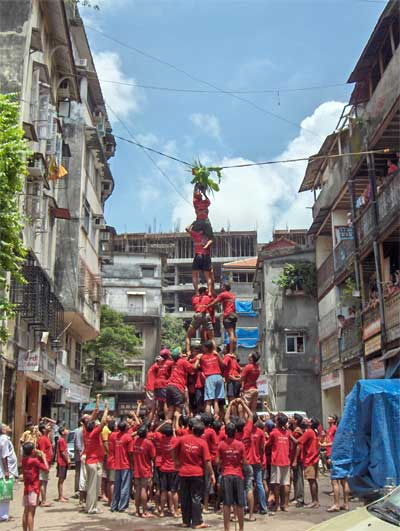
Govinda celebrations during the Krishna Janmaashtami festivities

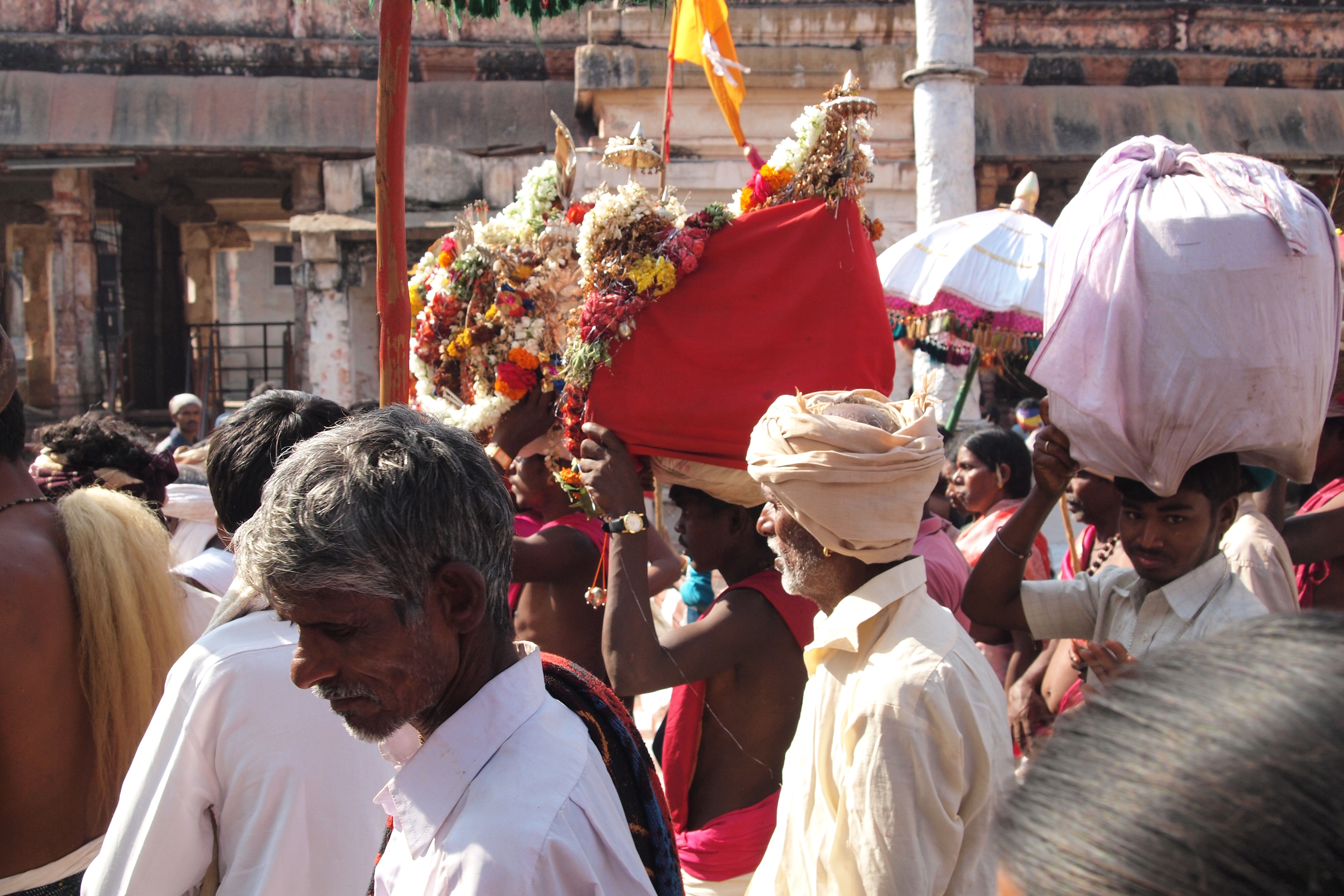
Hindu religious festival in Hampi

== Islamic ==
Among major Islamic religious festivals are Eid ul-Adha, Eid ul-Fitr and Ramadan.

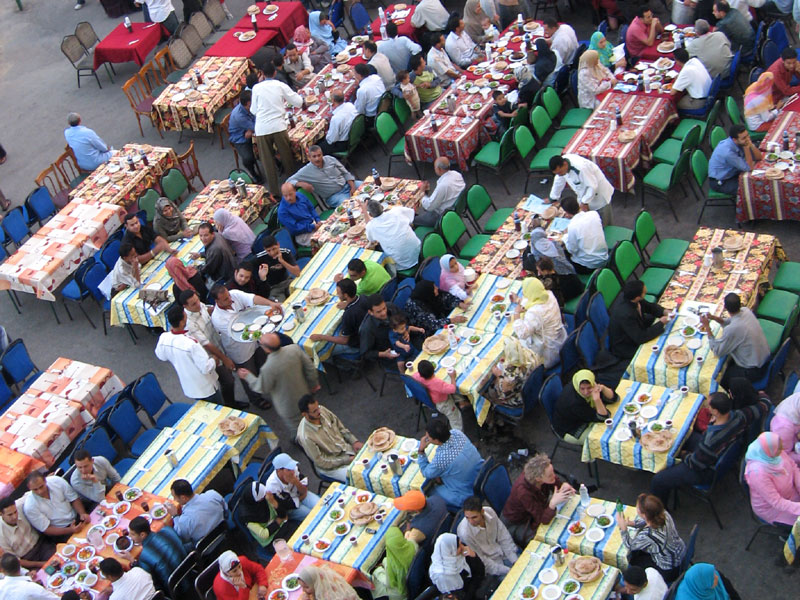
Iftar meal on Ramadan

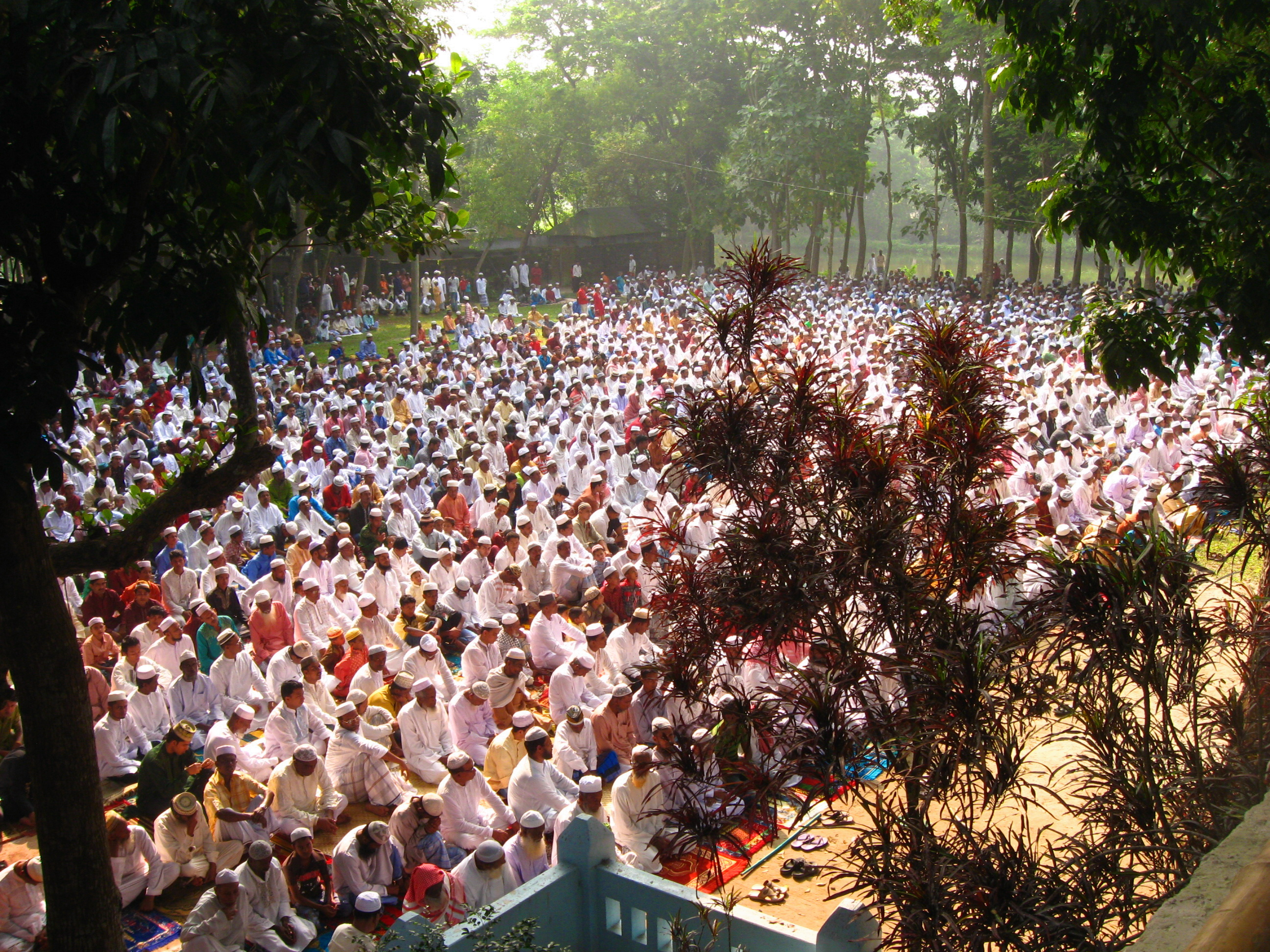
Eid Prayers at Barashalghar

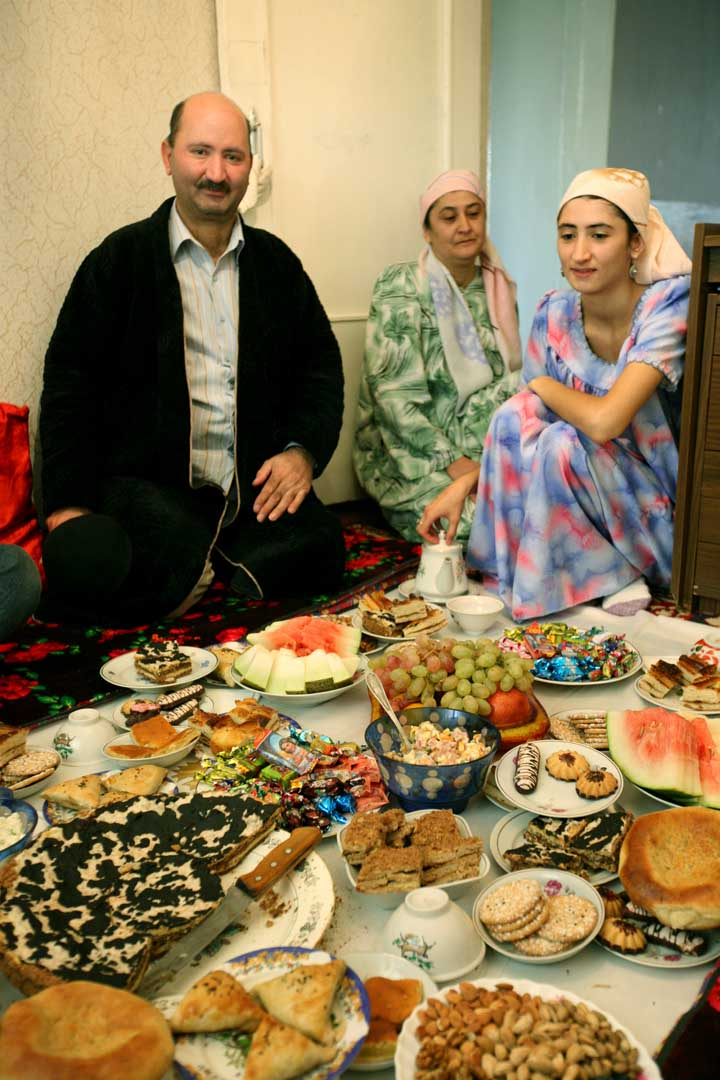
Eid in Tajikistan

== Jain ==
Important festivals include Paryushan, Mahavir Janma Kalyanak and Diwali.

== Jewish ==
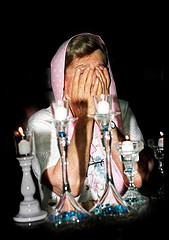
Reciting blessing over candles on the eve of Shabbat and Jewish holidays

A Jewish holiday (Yom Tov or chag in Hebrew) is a day that is holy to the Jewish people according to Judaism and is usually derived from the Hebrew Bible, specifically the Torah, and in some cases established by the rabbis in later eras. There are a number of festival days, fast days (ta'anit) and days of remembrance.

== Mandaean ==
Parwanaya is the largest Mandaean festival.

Dehwa Honina or Dehwa Ṭurma (the Little Feast) is a Mandaean religious festival which takes place on the 18th of Taura (Ayar), celebrating the return of the divine messenger Hibil Ziwa from the World of Darkness to the World of Light.

Mandaeans also celebrate Dehwa Rabba (New Year's Day) and Dehwa Daymaneh (Birthday of John the Baptist).

== Neo-Pagan ==
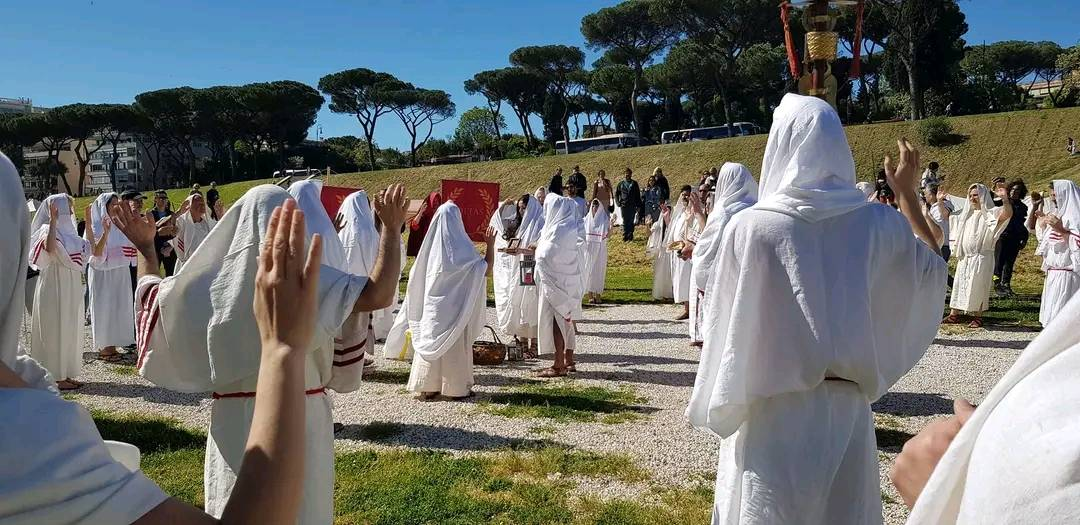
Celebration of the 2777th Natale di Roma at the Circus Maximus

Natale di Roma, historically known as Dies Romana and also referred to as Romaia, the festival linked to the foundation of Rome, celebrated on April 21. According to legend, Romulus is said to have founded the city of Rome on April 21, 753 BC. From this date, the Roman chronology derived its system, known by the Latin phrase Ab Urbe condita, meaning "from the founding of the City", which counted the years from this presumed foundation.

== Baháʼí Faith ==
The Baháʼí Faith has eleven holy days, which are important anniversaries in the history of the religion.

== Sikh ==
Major Sikh festivals include Guru Nanak Gurpurab, Guru Gobind Gurpurab, Maghi, Poonai, Sangrand, and Vaisakhi.

== See also ==
- Outline of festivals
- Lists of festivals
- List of foods with religious symbolism
