= Norbulingka =

Palace in Lhasa, Tibet

- Tibetan transcription(s); Tibetan: ནོར་བུ་གླིང་ག; Wylie transliteration: Nor bu gling ga Chinese transcription(s); Traditional: 羅布林卡; Simplified: 罗布林卡
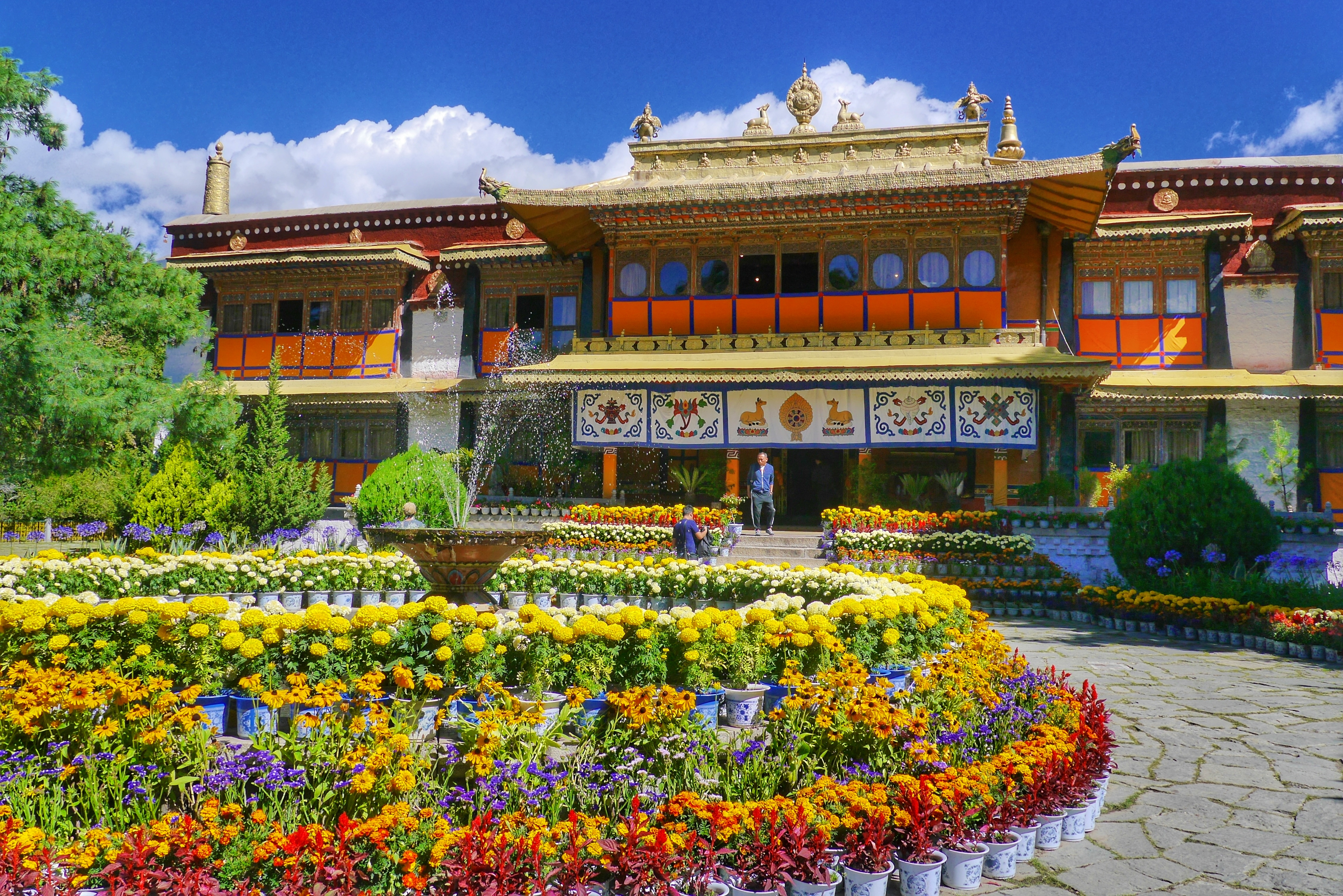
- Norbulingka in 2017

- Location within Tibet Autonomous Region

Religion
- Affiliation: Tibetan Buddhism

Location
- Location: Lhasa, Tibet
- Country: China
- Coordinates: 29°39′14″N 91°05′30″E

Architecture
- Founder: 7th Dalai Lama
- Established: 1755, completed 1783

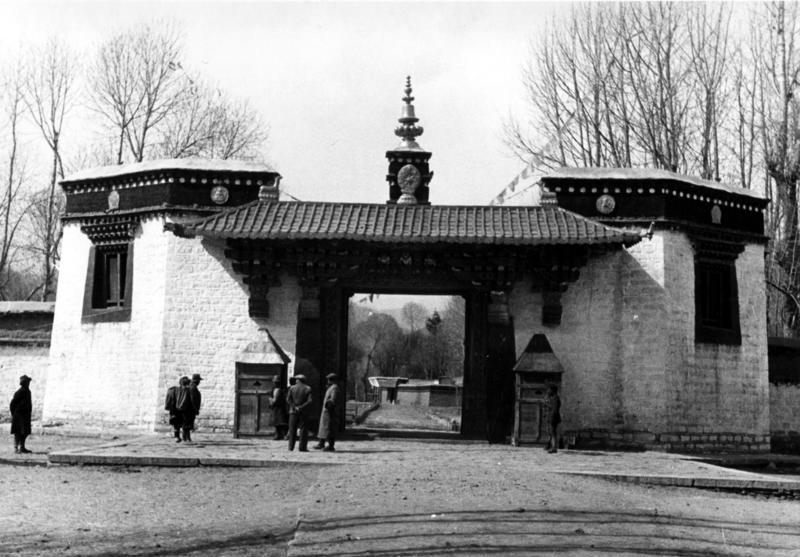
Entrance to Norbulingka in 1938

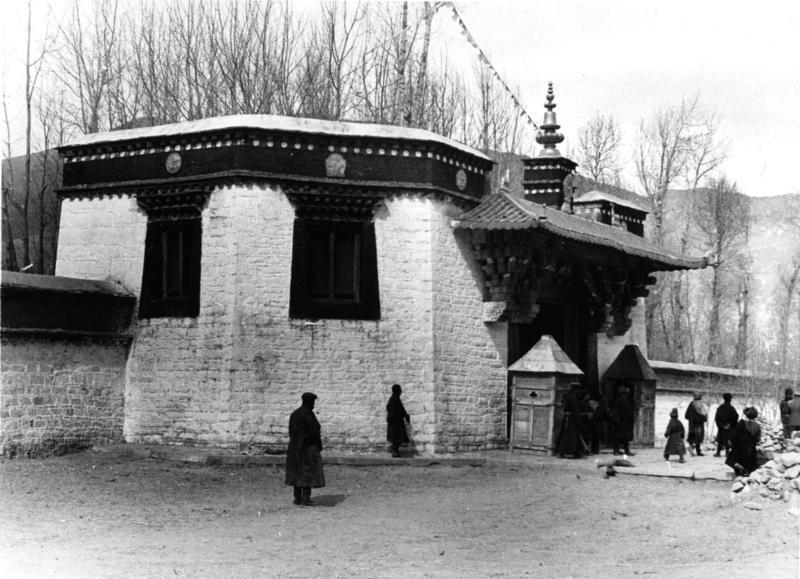
Front gate to the Dalai Lama's summer residence, 1938

Norbulingka (Standard Tibetan: ནོར་བུ་གླིང་ག; Wylie: Nor bu gling ga; simplified Chinese: 罗布林卡; traditional Chinese: 羅布林卡; literally "Jeweled Park") is a palace and surrounding park in Lhasa, Tibet built from 1755. It served as the traditional summer residence of the successive Dalai Lamas from the 1780s up until the 14th Dalai Lama's exile in 1959. Part of the "Historic Ensemble of the Potala Palace", Norbulingka is recognized as a UNESCO World Heritage Site, and was added as an extension of this Historic Ensemble in 2001. It was built by the 7th Dalai Lama and served both as administrative centre and religious centre. It is a unique representation of Tibetan palace architecture.

Norbulingka Palace is situated in the west side of Lhasa, a short distance to the southwest of Potala Palace. Norbulingka covers an area of around 36 hectares (89 acres) and considered to be the largest man-made garden in Tibet.

Norbulingka park is considered the premier park of all such horticultural parks in similar ethnic settings in Tibet. During the summer and autumn months, the parks in Tibet, including the Norbulingka, become hubs of entertainment with dancing, singing, music and festivities. The park is where the annual Sho Dun or "Yoghurt Festival" is held.

The Norbulingka palace has been mostly identified with the 13th and the 14th Dalai Lamas who commissioned most of the structures that still stand today. During the invasion of Tibet in 1950, a number of buildings were damaged, but were rebuilt beginning in 2003, when the Chinese government initiated renovation works here to restore some of the damaged structures, and also the greenery, the flower gardens and the lakes.

== Names ==
In Tibetan, Norbulingka means 'Jewel(ed) Garden.' or 'Jewel(ed) Park'. The word lingka (Tibetan: གླིང་ག, Wylie: gling ga) is commonly used in Tibet to define all horticultural parks in Lhasa and other cities. When the Cultural Revolution began in 1966, Norbulingka was renamed 'People's Park' and opened to the public.

== Geography and environment ==
The palace, with 374 rooms, is located 3 kilometres (1.9 mi) west of the Potala Palace, which was the winter palace. It is in the western suburb of Lhasa City on the bank of the Kyichu River. When construction of the palace was started (during the 7th Dalai Lama's period) in the 1740s, the site was a barren land, overgrown with weeds and scrub and infested with wild animals.

The park, situated at an elevation of 3,650 metres (11,980 ft) had flower gardens of roses, petunias, hollyhocks, marigolds, chrysanthemums and rows of herbs in pots and rare plants. Fruit trees including apple, peach and apricot were also reported (but the fruits did not ripen in Lhasa), and also poplar trees and bamboo. In its heyday, the Norbulingka grounds were also home to wildlife in the form of peacocks and brahminy ducks in the lakes. The large size and layout of the park also allows cycling around the area. The gardens serve as picnic spots, and provide for a venue for theater, dancing and festivals, particularly the Shodun or 'Yogurt Festival' at the beginning of August, with families camping in the grounds for days, surrounded by makeshift windbreaks of rugs and scarves.

There is also a zoo at Norbulingka, originally created to house the animals which were given to the Dalai Lamas. Heinrich Harrer helped the 14th Dalai Lama build a small movie theater there in the 1950s.

== History ==
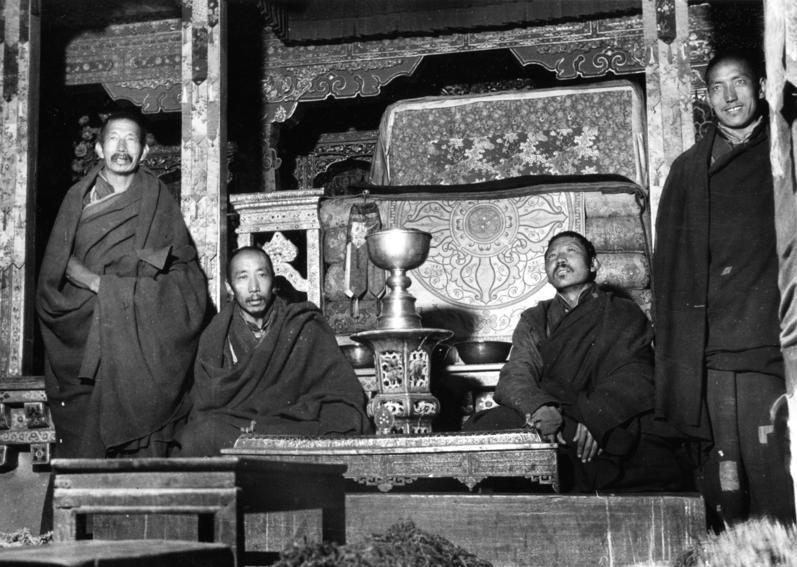
Monks in front of the throne of the Dalai Lamas, Norbulingka. 1938.

Norbulingka Palace of the Dalai Lamas was built about 100 years after the Potala Palace was built on the Parkori peak, over a 36 hectares (89 acres) land area. It was built a little away to the west of the Potala for the exclusive use by the Dalai Lama to stay in during the summer months. Tenzin Gyatso, the present 14th Dalai Lama, stayed here before he fled to India. The building of the palace and the park was undertaken by the 7th Dalai Lama from 1755. The Norbulingka Park and Summer Palace were completed in 1783 under Jampel Gyatso, the 8th Dalai Lama, on the outskirts of Lhasa, and became the summer residence during the reign of the Eighth Dalai Lama.

The earliest history of Norbulingka is traced originally to a spring at this location, which was used during the summer months by the 7th Dalai Lama to cure his health problems. The Qing dynasty permitted the Dalai Lama to build a palace at this location for his stay, as a resting pavilion. Since subsequent Dalai Lamas also used to stay here for their studies (before enthronement) and as a summer resort, Norbulingka came to be known as the Summer Palace of the Dalai Lama.

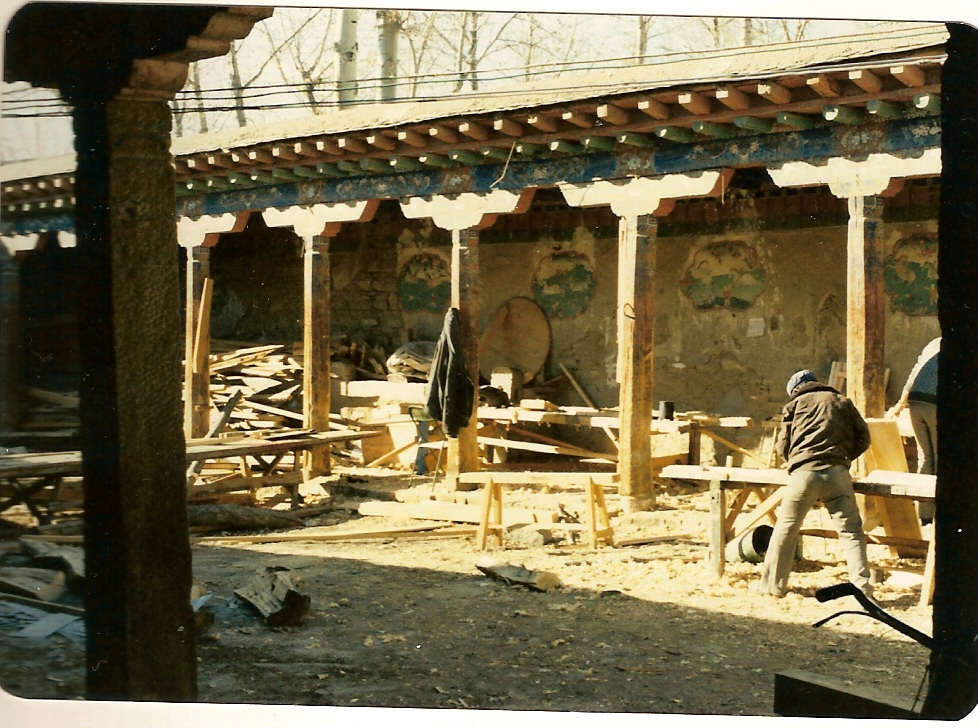
The stables of the Dalai Lamas in Norbulingka, photographed in 1986

The 8th Dalai Lama was responsible for many additions to the Norbulingka complex in the form of palaces and gardens. However, it is sometimes reported that 6th through to 12th Dalai Lamas died young and under mysterious circumstances, conjectured as having been poisoned. Most of the credit for the expansion of Norbulingka is given to the 13th and the 14th Dalai Lamas.

It was from the Norbulingka palace that the Dalai Lama escaped to India on 17 March 1959, under the strong belief that he would be captured by the Chinese. On this day, the Dalai Lama dressed like an ordinary Tibetan, and, carrying a rifle across his shoulder, left the Norbulinga palace and Tibet to seek asylum in India. As there was a dust storm blowing at that time, he was not recognized. According to Reuters, "The Dalai Lama and his officials, who had also escaped from the palace, rode out of the city on horses to join his family for the trek to India". The Chinese discovered this "great escape" only two days later. The party journeyed through the Himalayas for two weeks, and finally crossed the Indian border where they received political asylum. Norbulingka was later surrounded by protesters and subject to an attack by the Chinese.

The summer residence of the Dalai Lama, located in the Norbulingka Park, is now a tourist attraction. The palace has a large collection of Italian chandeliers, Ajanta frescoes, Tibetan carpets, and many other artifacts. Murals of Buddha and the 5th Dalai Lama are seen in some rooms. The 14th Dalai Lama's (who fled from Tibet and took asylum in India) meditation room, bedroom, conference room and bathroom are part of the display and are explained to tourists.

== Layout ==
Built in the 18th century, the Norbulingka Palace and the garden within its precincts have undergone several additions over the years. The vast complex covers a garden area of 3.6 km^{2} including 3.4 km^{2} of lush green pasture land covered with forests. It is said to be the "highest garden" anywhere in the world and has earned the epithet "Plateau Oxygen Bar."

The Norbulingka is the "world's highest, largest and best-preserved ancient artificial horticultural garden", which also blends gardening with architecture and sculpture arts from several Tibetan ethnic groups; 30,000 cultural relics of ancient Tibetan history are preserved here. The complex is demarcated under five distinct sections. A cluster of buildings to the left of the entrance gate is the Kelsang Phodang (The full name of this palace is "bskal bzang bde skyid pho brang"), named after the 7th Dalai Lama, Kelsang Gyatso (1708–1757). It is a three-storied palace with chambers for the worship of Buddha, bedrooms, reading rooms and shelters at the centre. The Khamsum Zilnon, a two-storied pavilion, is opposite the entry gate. The 8th Dalai Lama, Jamphel Gyatso (1758–1804) substantially enlarged the palace by adding three temples and the perimeter walls on the south east sector and the park also came to life with plantation of fruit trees and evergreens brought from various parts of Tibet. The garden was well developed with a large retinue of gardeners. To the northwest of Kelsang Phodrong is the Tsokyil Phodrong, which is a pavilion in the midst of a lake and the Chensil Phodrong. On the west side of Norbulingka is the Golden Phodron, built by a benefactor in 1922, and a cluster of buildings which were built during the 13th Dalai Lama's time. The 13th Dalai Lama was responsible for architectural modifications, including the large red doors to the palace; he also improved the Chensel Lingkha garden to the northwest. To the north of Tsokyil Phodrong is the Takten Migyur Phodrong which was built in 1954 by 14th Dalai Lama and is the most elegant palace in the complex, a fusion of a temple and villa. The new summer palace, which faces south, was built with Central Government funds, and completed in 1956.

The earliest building is the Kelsang Palace built by the Seventh Dalai Lama which is "a beautiful example of Yellow Hat architecture. Dalai Lamas watched, from the first floor of this palace, the folk operas held opposite to the Khamsum Zilnon during the Shoton festival. Its fully restored throne room is also of interest."

The Norbulingka's most dramatic area was the Lake Palace, built in the southwest area. In the centre of the lake, three islands were connected to the land by short bridges. A palace was built on each island. A horse stable and a row of four houses contained the gifts received by the Dalai Lamas from the Chinese emperors and other foreign dignitaries.

Construction of the 'New Palace' was begun in 1954 by the present Dalai Lama, and completed in 1956. It is a double-story structure with a Tibetan flat roof. It has an elaborate layout with a maze of rooms and halls. This modern complex contains chapels, gardens, fountains and pools. It is a modern Tibetan-style building embellished with ornamentation and facilities. In the first floor of this building, there are 301 paintings (frescoes) on Tibetan history, dated to the time when Dalai Lama and the Panchen Lama met Chairman Mao Zedong. As of 1986, the palace had an antique Russian radio, and a Philips console still containing old 78 rpm records.

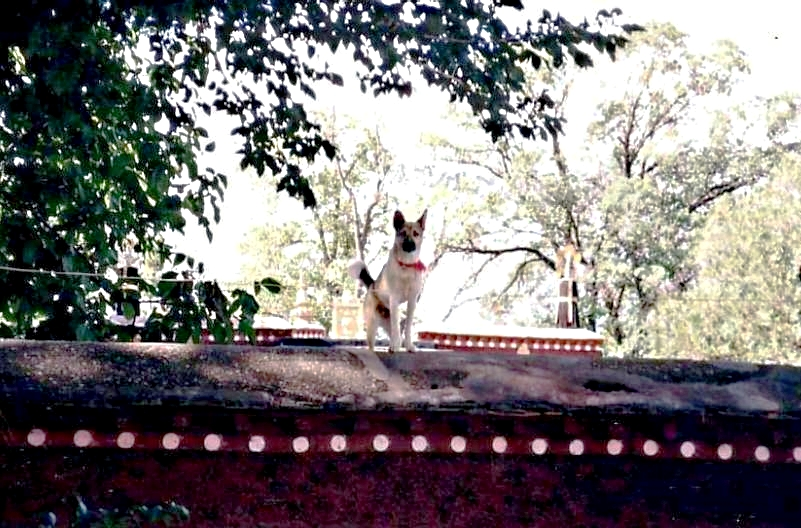
Guard dog on Norbulingka wall

The entire Norbulingka complex was delimited by two sets of walls. The area encompassed by the inner wall, painted yellow, was exclusively for the use of the Dalai Lama and his attendants. Officials and the Dalai Lama's royal family lived in the area between the inner yellow wall and the outer wall. A dress code was followed for visitors to enter the palace; those wearing Tibetan dress were allowed; guards posted at the gates controlled the entry, and ensured that no western hat-wearing people (which was made popular in Tibet during Lhamdo Dhondups time) were allowed inside. Wearing shoes inside the park was banned. Guards at the gate offered a formal arms salute to the nobles and high-ranking officials. Even the officials at the lower category also received a salute. The gates outside the yellow wall were heavily protected. Only the Dalai Lama and his guardians could pass through these gates. Tibetan mastiff dogs kept in niches of the compound walls, and tied with long yak hair leashes, were the guard dogs that patrolled the perimeter of the Norbulingka.

On the east gate to the Norbulingka there are two Snow Lion statues covered in khatas (thin white scarves offered as a mark of respect), the Snow Lion on the left is accompanied by a lion cub. The mythical Snow Lion is the symbol of Tibet; according to legend they jump from one snow peak to another. Most of the buildings are closed now; have become storehouses or used as offices for those who take care of the maintenance works. Some additional buildings seen now are souvenir kiosks catering to the visitors.

== Restoration and preservation ==
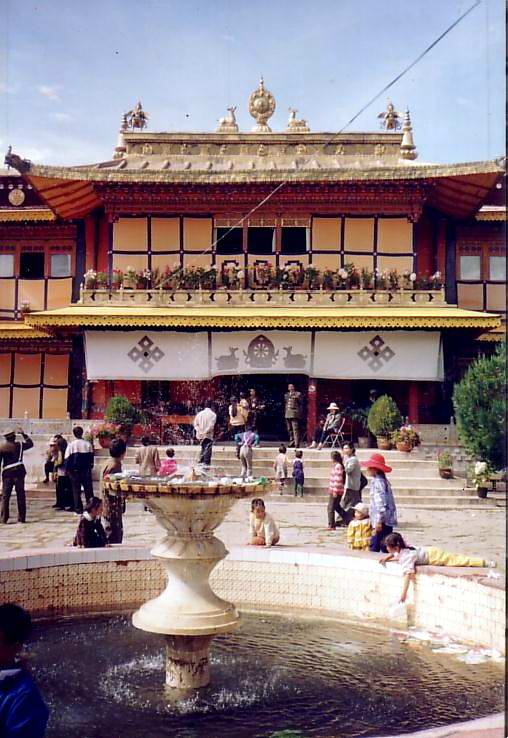
Norbulingka, August, 1993

During the Cultural Revolution, the Norbulingka complex suffered extensive damage. However, in 2001, the Central Committee of the Chinese Government in its 4th Tibet Session resolved to restore the complex to its original glory. Grant funds to the extent of 67.4 million Yuan (US$8.14 million) were sanctioned in 2002 by the Central Government for restoration work; restoration work beginning in 2003 mainly covered the Kelsang Phodron Palace, the Kashak Cabinet offices and many other structures.

Norbulingka was declared a "National Important Cultural Relic Unit", in 1988 by the State council. On 14 December 2001, UNESCO inscribed it as a World Heritage Site as part of the "Historic Ensemble of the Potala Palace". The historic ensemble covers three monuments namely, the Potala Palace, winter palace of the Dalai Lama, the Jokhang Temple Monastery and the Norbulingka, the Dalai Lama's former summer palace built in the 18th century considered a masterpiece of Tibetan art. The citation states: "preservation of vestiges of the traditional Tibetan architecture". This is viewed in the context of extensive modern development that has taken place under Chinese suzerainty in Tibet. The Chinese State Tourism Administration has also categorized Norbulingka at a "Grade 4 A at the National Tourism (spot) level," in 2001. It was also declared a public park in 1959.

== Festivals ==
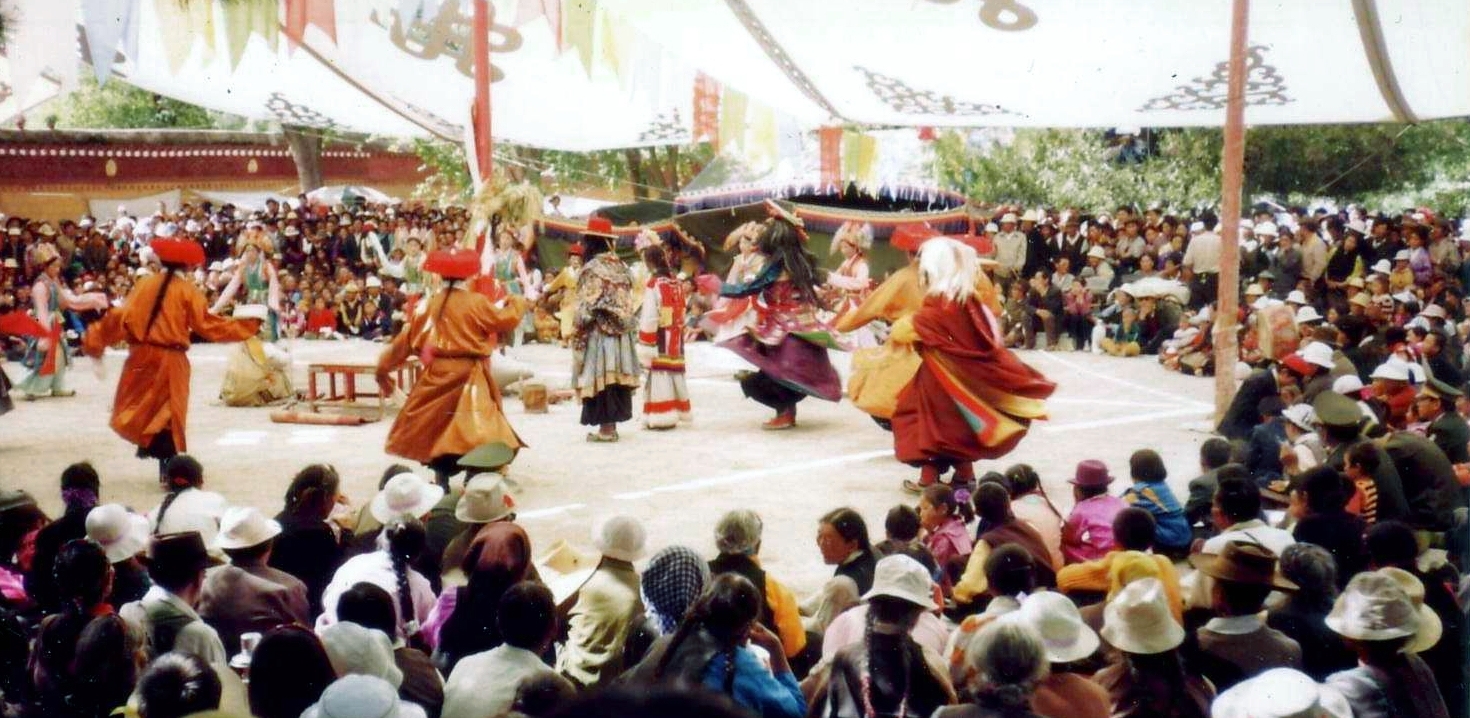
Dancing at Sho Dun Festival, Norbulingka, 1993

Sho Dun Festival, also spelt Shoton Festival, (popularly known as the "yogurt festival") is an annual festival held at Norbulingka. The date for the festival is set according to the Tibetan calendar, which is a Lunar-based calendar. The festival is celebrated during the seventh month in the first seven days of the Full Moon period, which corresponds to dates in July/August according to the Gregorian calendar. The week-long festivities are marked by eating and drinking, with Ache Lhamo, the Tibetan opera performances as the highlight, held in the park and other venues in the city. On this occasion yak races are a special attraction held in the Lhasa stadium. During this festival, famed Opera troupes from different regions of Tibet perform at the Norbulingka grounds; the first opera troupe was founded in the 15th century by Tangtong Gyelpo, considered the Leonardo da Vinci of Tibet. Over the centuries other opera formats of the 'White Masked Sect' and the "innovative" 'Black Masked Sect' added to the repertoire, and all these forms and subsequent innovations are enacted at the Sho Dun festival. The Chinese observe the holidays of the Chinese calendar at the Norbulingka grounds with Tibetan music and dance under Government patronage. Tibetans also observe traditional holidays with Tibetan music and dance at this venue.

During the reign of the Dalai Lamas (from the 7th Dalai Lama onwards), their annual shifting of residence from the Potala Palace to Norbulingka Palace was also an elaborate festive event. The Dalai Lama used to be escorted in a glittering procession to spend 6 months of the summer season in the Norbulingka Palace.

== Gallery ==
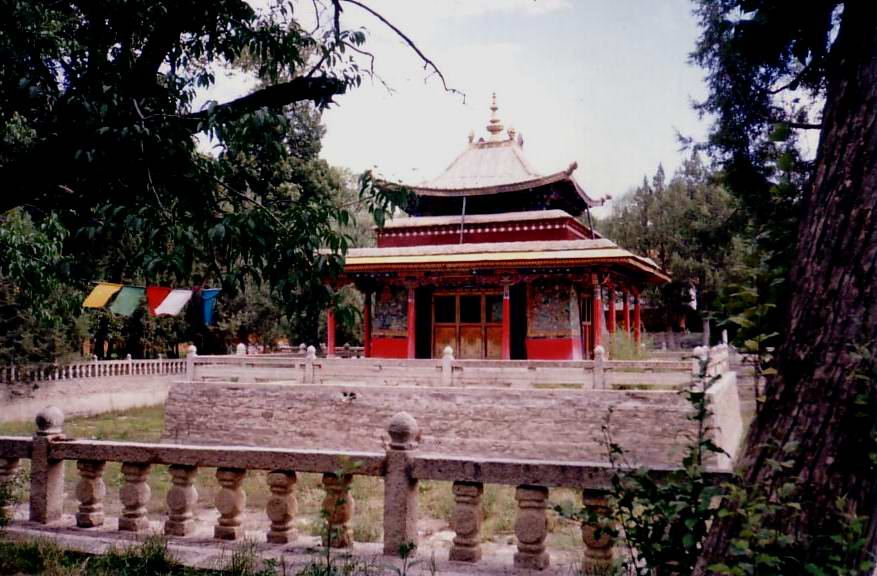
Norbulingka, 1993

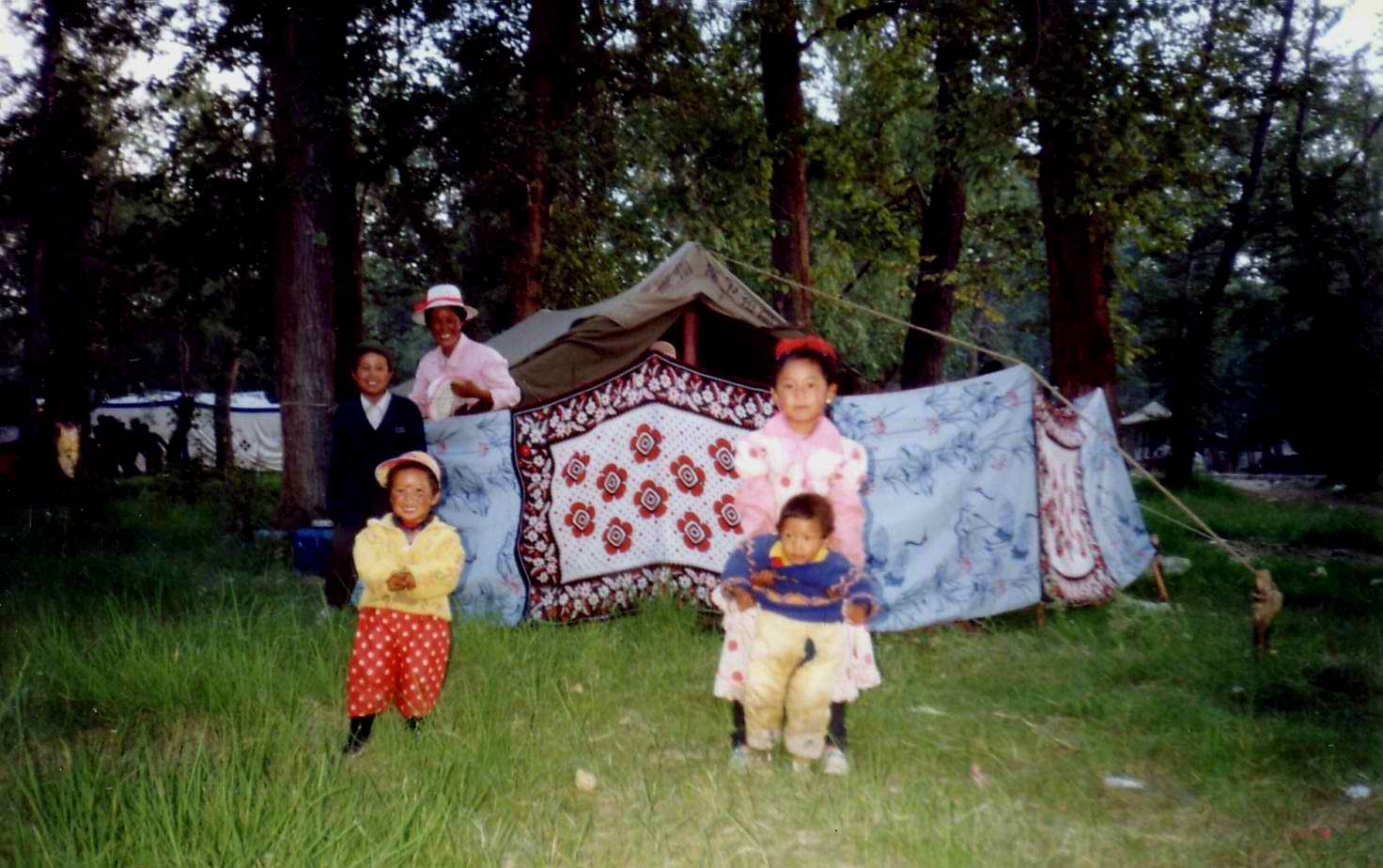
Tibetan family at Sho Dun Festival, Norbulingka, 1993

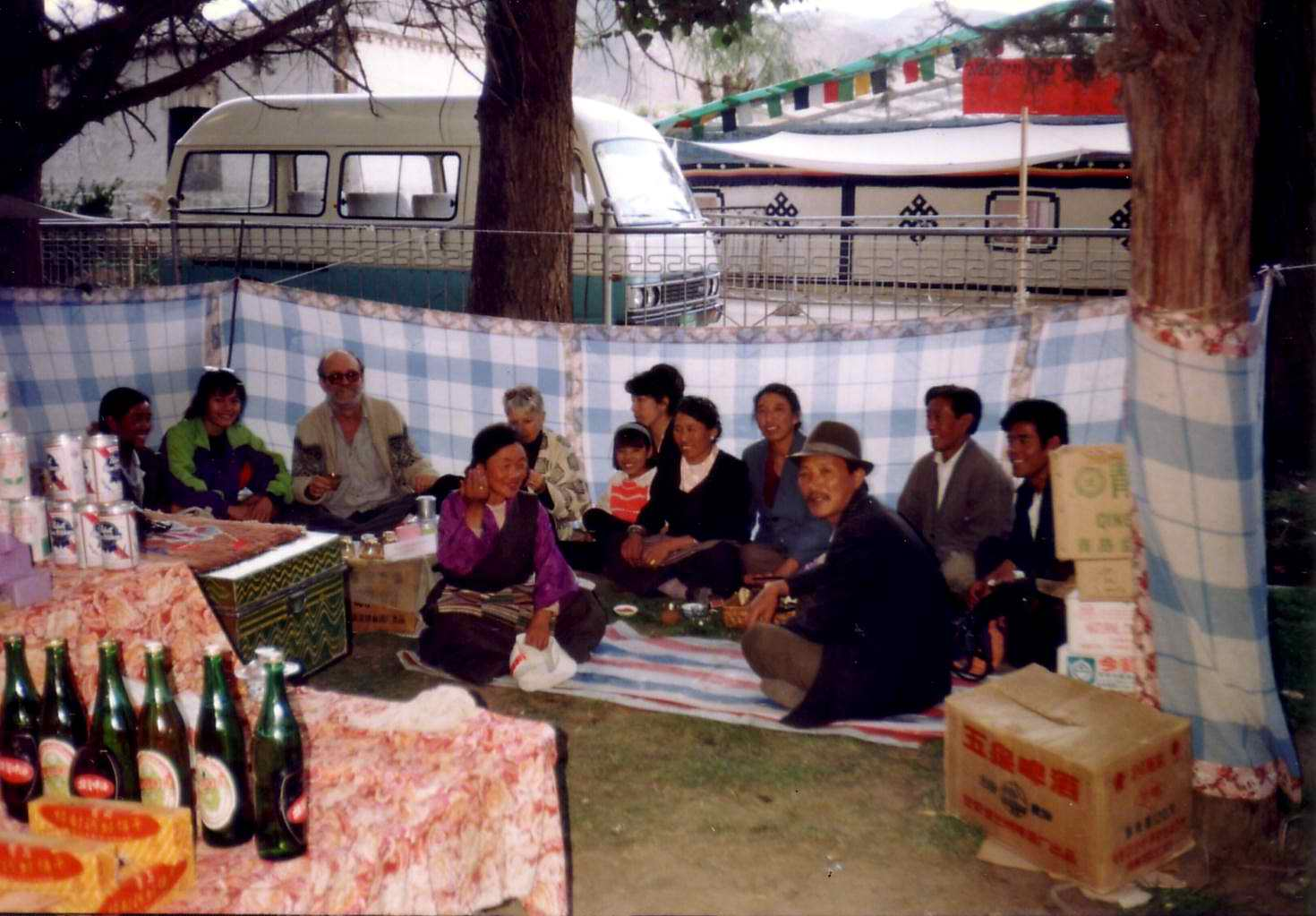
Partying at Sho Dun Festival, Norbulingka, 1993

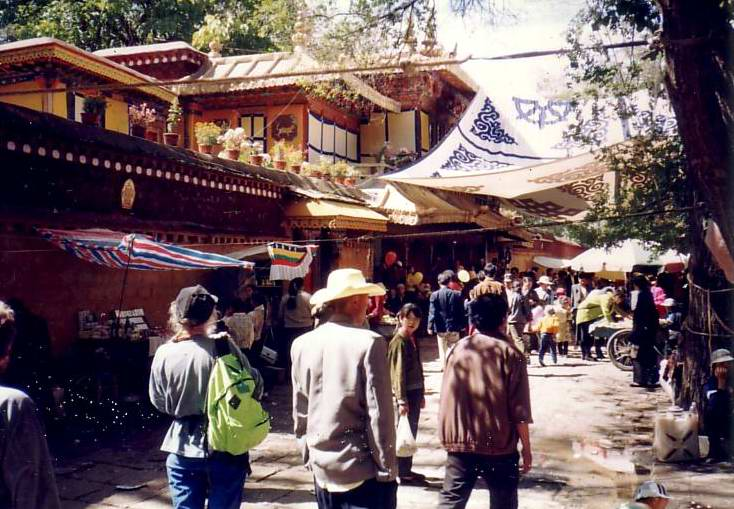
Norbulingka. Sho Dun, the 'Yoghurt Festival', 1993.

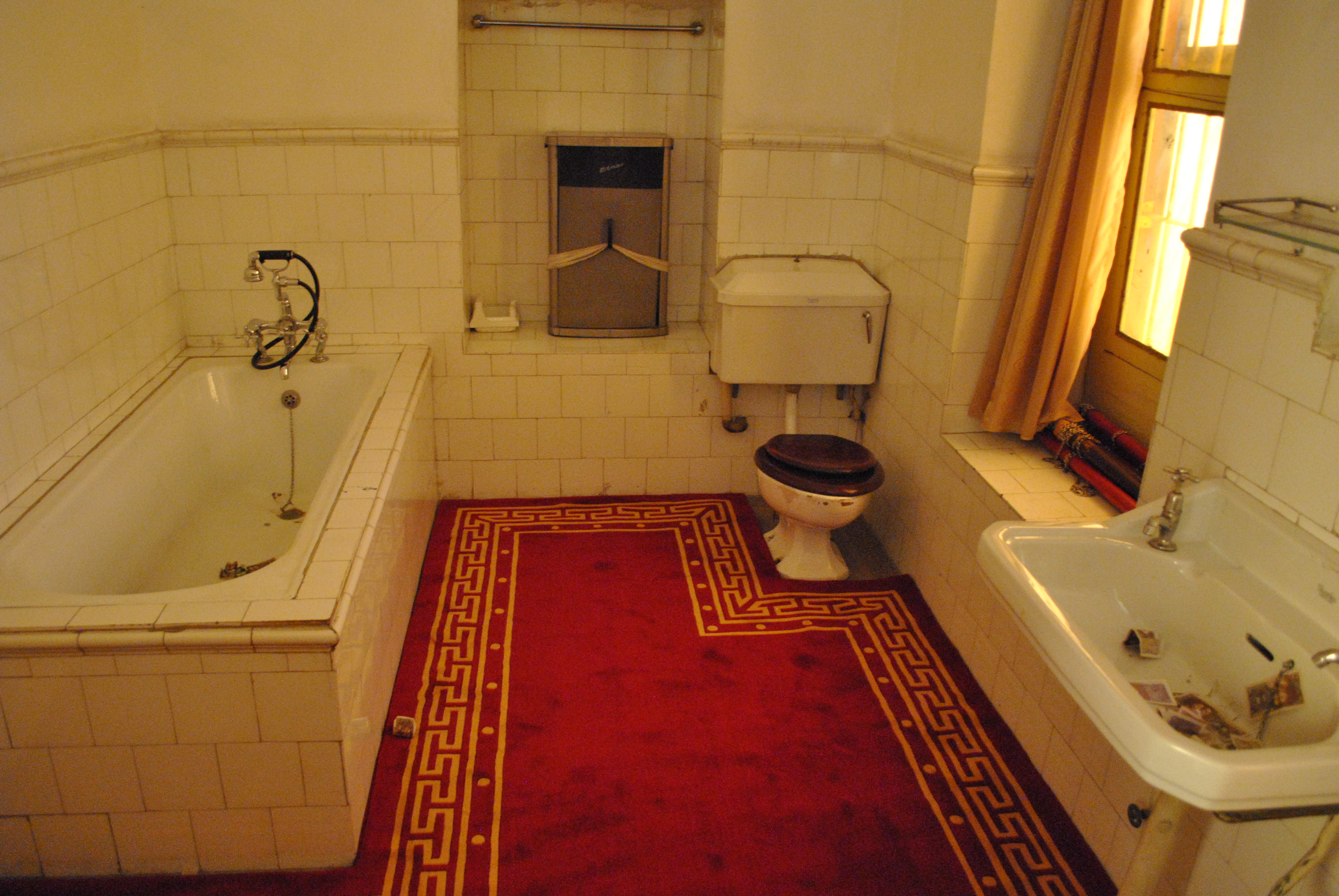
Bathroom of the 14th Dalai Lama at Norbulingka
