= Traditional games of Tibet =

Tibet has many traditional games with origins dating up to 5,000 years ago.

== Traditional games ==
=== Rock carrying ===
There are various rock-lifting competitions in Tibet that centre on participants who carry and manoeuvre rocks that are 150 kilograms (330 lb) or more.

== Board games ==
=== Gyiren ===
Gyiren is a popular Tibetan variation of snooker which originated in India.

=== Sho ===
Sho ( Tibetan : ཤོ ) is a traditional race game in Tibet, still common today. Its name is simply the Tibetan word for "dice". It is traditionally played for money and by men, with two to four players—three being the most common. With four players, the usual variant is to play as two teams of two, with the partners sitting opposite each other.

=== Ming mang ===
Position: a8 white circle, b8 black circle, c8 black circle, d8 black circle, e8 black circle, f8 black circle, g8 black circle, h8 black circle, a7 white circle, h7 black circle, a6 white circle, h6 black circle, a5 white circle, h5 black circle, a4 white circle, h4 black circle, a3 white circle, h3 black circle, a2 white circle, h2 black circle, a1 white circle, b1 white circle, c1 white circle, d1 white circle, e1 white circle, f1 white circle, g1 white circle, h1 black circle

Starting positions for Ming mang

Ming mang (Tibetan: མིག་མངས, Wylie: mig mangs) is a two-player abstract strategy board game from Tibet. Ming mang is also a general term for the word "board game" in Tibet. The correct name and spelling of the game may actually be Mig mang(s) (or Mig-Mang(s)), but pronounced Ming mang or Mi Mang. The term mig mang is also applied to Tibetan go with both games using exactly the same board which is a 17 x 17 square board, and black and white pieces. Mig is in reference to the chart (the pattern of horizontal and vertical lines) of the board, and Mangs refers to the notion that the more charts are used on the board, the more pieces are needed to play the game, but some state that it means "many eyes". The game may also be known as Gundru (or Gun-dru). The game was popular among some Tibetan monks before the Chinese invasion of Tibet in 1950, and the uprising in 1959, and among aristocratic families.

== Animal events ==
=== Horse racing ===
The Litang Horse Festival is a summer horse festival held in Litang County, Sichuan province, China. Khampas from all over the Tibetan Plateau come to trade, celebrate and ride. Khampas are Tibetan nomads who are usually herders.

=== Polo ===
Polo is a stick and ball game that is played on horseback as a traditional field sport, and is one of the oldest known team sports in the world.

Polo has been played in Tibet since at least the early eighth century.

=== Yak racing ===
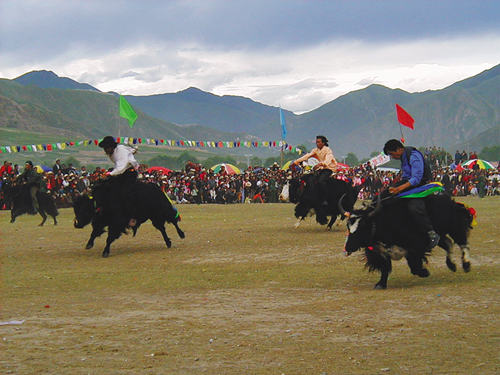
A yak race

Yak racing (Chinese: 赛牦牛) is a spectator sport held at many traditional festivals of Tibet, Kazakhstan, Kyrgyzstan, Gilgit-Baltistan, Ladakh and Mongolia, in gatherings which integrate popular dances and songs with traditional physical games. For Tibetans in particular it is a very special festive occasion.

== See also ==
- Traditional games of China
- Traditional games of South Asia
