= Sho Dun Festival =

Buddhist festival

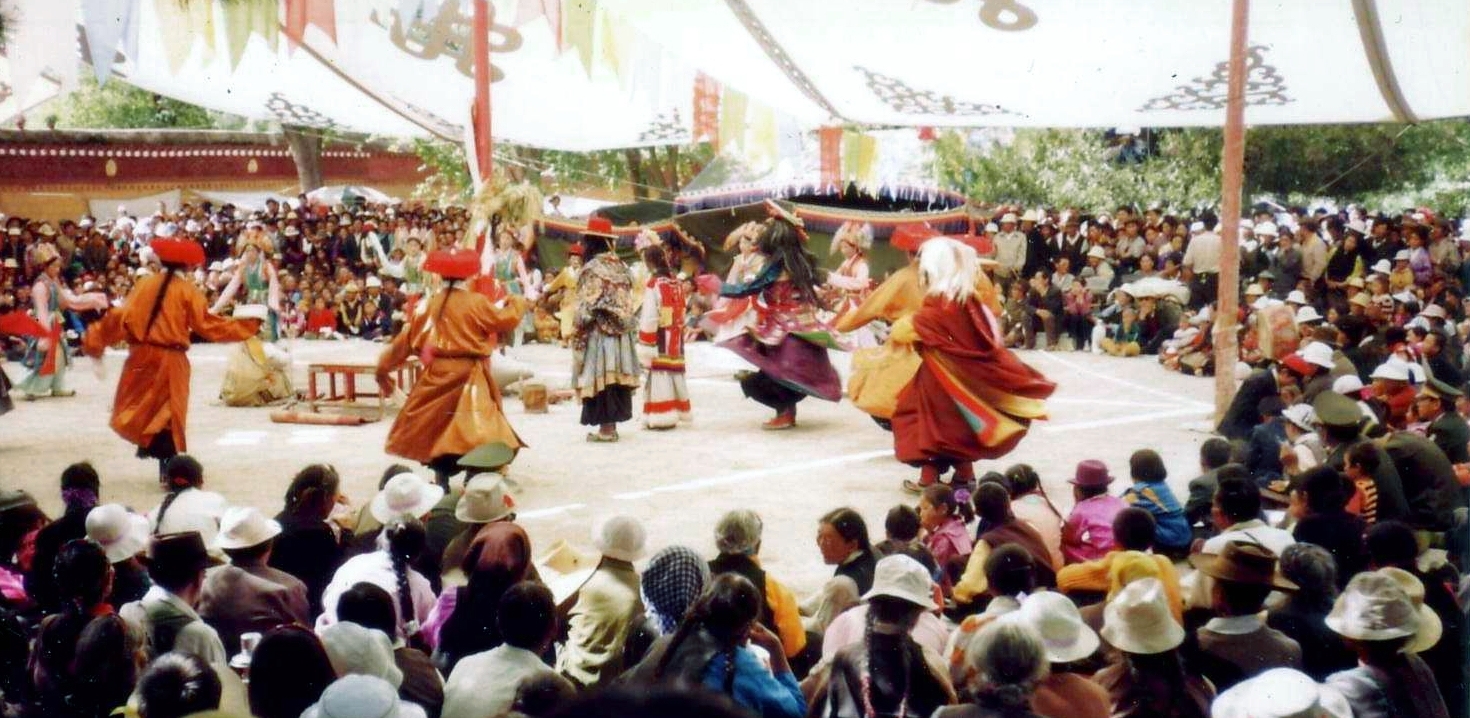
- Also called: Shoton Festival, Yogurt Festival, Banquet
- Observed by: Tibetans, Bhutanese, Nepalese, Monpa
- Type: Tibetan culture, Tibetan Buddhist
- Frequency: Annual

The Sho Dun Festival (Tibetan: ༄༅། ཞོ་སྟོན།; Chinese: 雪頓節; pinyin: Xuědùn Jié), commonly known as the Shoton or Yogurt Festival or Banquet since "Sho" means Yogurt and "Dun" means Banquet, is an annual festival held at Norbulingka or "Jewel Park" palace in Lhasa, Tibet Autonomous Region.

The festival is celebrated in the summer, from the 15th to the 24th of the 5th lunar month - usually about the middle of August, after a month's retreat by the monks who stay within their monasteries to avoid walking on the emerging summer insects and killing them.

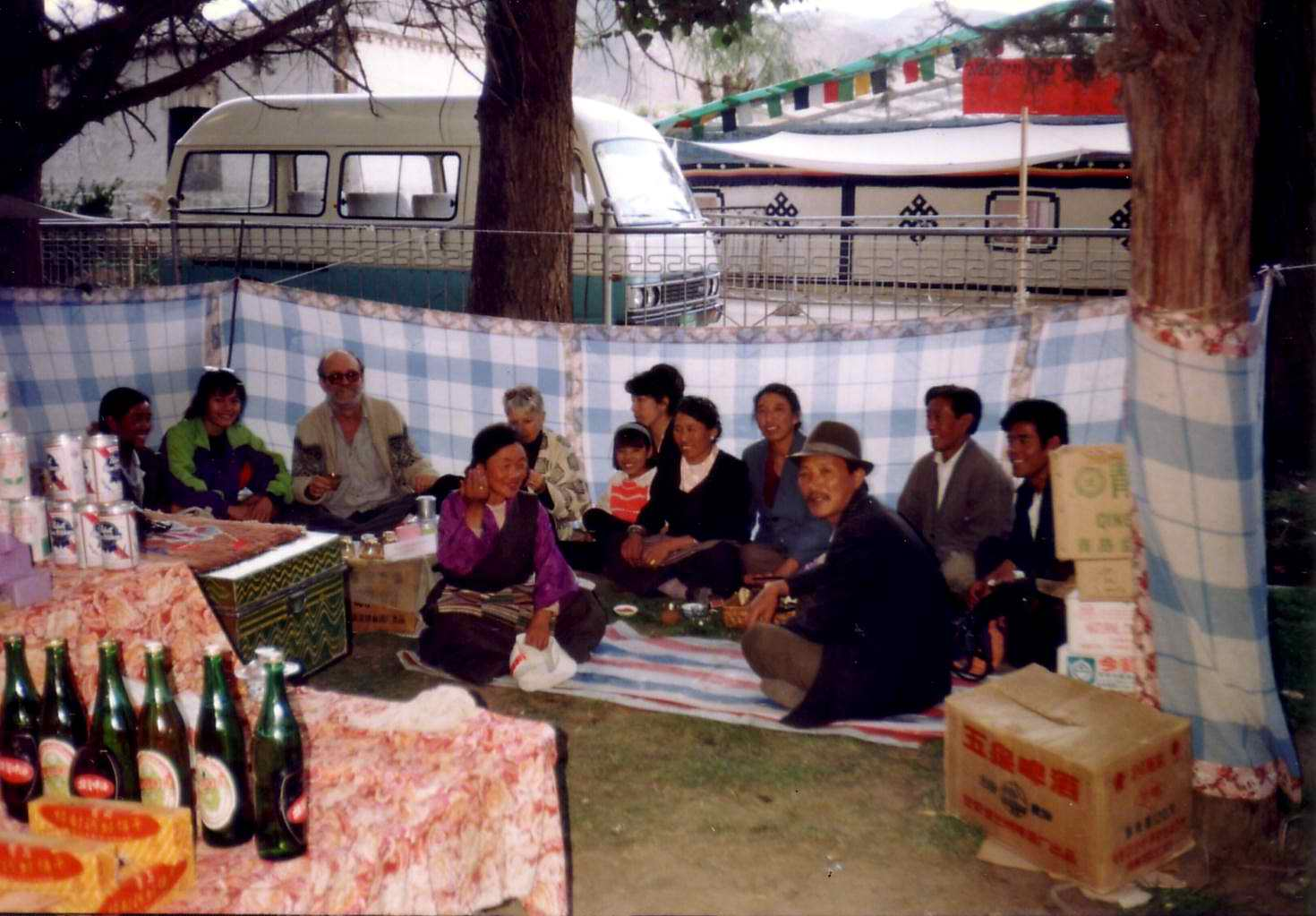
Partying at Sho Dun Festival, Norbulingka, 1993

It began in the 11th century with a banquet given by the laypeople for the monks featuring yogurt. Later on, summer operas, or Lhamo, and theatricals were added to the festivities. The operas, "last all day with clashing cymbals, bells and drums; piercing recitatives punctuating more melodious choruses; hooded villains, leaping devils, swirling girls with long silk sleeves. In the past, dancers came from all over Tibet, but today there is only the state-run Lhasa Singing and Dancing Troupe."

== See also ==
- Tshechu, similar festival in Bhutan
