= Yak racing =

Traditional sport in Central Asia

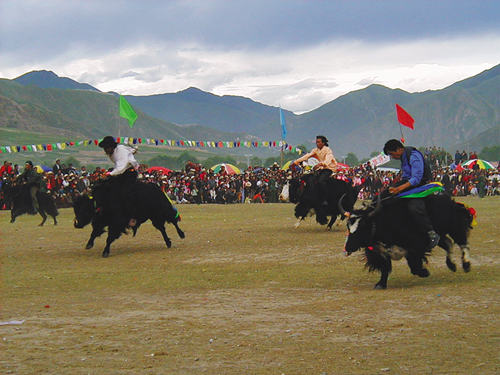
A yak race

Yak racing (Chinese: 赛牦牛) is a spectator sport held at many traditional festivals of Tibet, Kazakhstan, Kyrgyzstan, Gilgit-Baltistan, Ladakh and Mongolia, in gatherings which integrate popular dances and songs with traditional physical games. For Tibetans in particular it is a very special festive occasion.

== The race ==
Each of the competitors, which commonly number 10 or 12, mounts his or her yak, and the yaks run towards the opposite end of the race course. Yak racing is also known to be performed in parts of Kazakhstan, Kyrgyzstan and in Pamir in Pakistan. The race attains a feverish pitch with the daredevilry of the yak rider and the yak displaying their pluck to reach the target.

Yaks and their riders gather at the venue of racing from different villages of the region. Now nearly 150 yaks are entered into the race, as against 50 in the past. The race is a very colourful event with both the yak and its rider dressed in strikingly attractive clothing and decorations; the yak's head is adorned with red tassels, the horns are wrapped in colourful silk cloth, the ears are draped in ribbons and the tail is covered with cloth in fan shaped cloth with Tibetan designs. The riders and herdsmen also turn up wearing very colourful attire suitable for the occasion as lucky symbols so that their yaks could get to win the first place, The race has the same degree of risks as is involved in horse racing. The race track is nowadays of 2000 metres length in open fields and racing yaks would cover this distance in about 8 minutes. The winning yak and its rider get the adulation of the people and are treated with respect.

== In China ==
Yak racing became an integral part of the Jyekundo (Yushu in Chinese) Horse Festival in 2006. It was held 20 km south of Jyekundo near the small township of Batang with over 20,000 people in attendance. For the 2007 horse festival all 6 counties of Yushu Tibetan Autonomous Prefecture are combining resources and financing together to provide a larger festival, called Khampa Arts Festival (Chin. Kangba Yishu Jie) in the prefecture capital of Jyekundo with an anticipated 40,000 to 50,000 people in attendance. Yak racing is also an integral part of the nineteen-day Darma Festival in Gyangze, and a comic highlight of the Damxung Horse Festival also known as the Dajyur.

Yak racing is also a common sport in the farming and stockbreeding areas on the grand Tibetan Plateau of Qingzang altiplano. They hold yak racing events annually to celebrate the good harvest, and they pray for good weather during the coming year. The festival which used to be held on 25 November has been reordered as the Wangguo Festival and is held before the harvest season in August.

== In Mongolia ==
In the northern Khangai Mountains of Mongolia, the traditional Yak Festival is held near the lake Terkhiin Tsagaan Nuur every year, on the first and second days of August.

== See also ==
- Buzkashi
