= Michael Lilienthal =

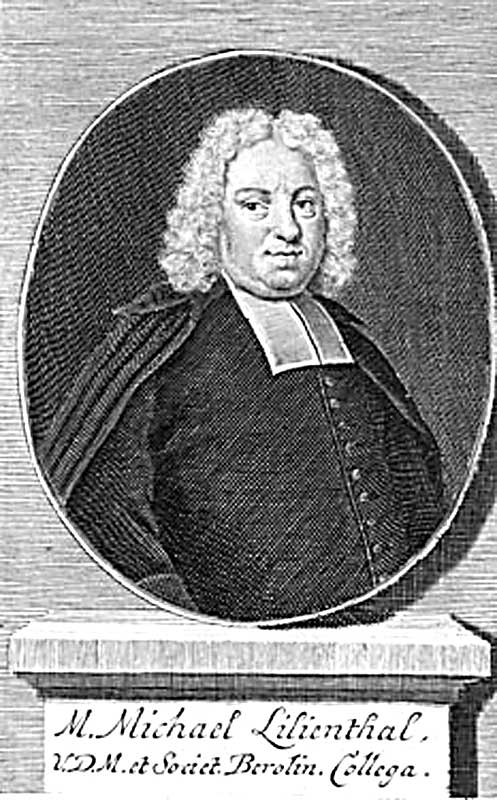
- Born: 8 September 1686; Liebstadt
- Died: 23 January 1750 (aged 63); Königsberg
- Alma mater: University of Königsberg
- Occupation: Theologian, librarian

Michael Lilienthal (8 September 1686 – 23 January 1750) was a German theologian. He was born in Liebstadt, Prussia, on 8 September 1686. He studied theology at Königsberg and Jena, and became professor in the University of Rostock. He afterwards visited Holland, where he studied philology and archaeology, and after his return was for some years professor at Königsberg. In 1714 he became assistant librarian of that university, and in 1719 was appointed deacon of one of the churches at Heidelberg. He was made member of the Academy of Berlin in 1711, and of that of Strasburg in 1733. He died in Königsberg on 23 January 1750.

His principal works are Biblisch-exegetische Bibliothek (Königsb. 1740–1744, 3 volumes, 8vo); Biblischer Archivarius d. Heiligen Schrift (Könsigsb. 1745–1746, 2 volumes, 4to: it contains a list of Biblical commentators, arranged in the order of the difficult passages); Theologisch-homelit. Archivarius (Königs., 1749, 4to). See Herzog, Real-Encyklop. 8:413; Hoefer, Nouv. Biog. Generale, 31:225. (J.N.P.)
