= Dajyur =

Tibetan festival

Dajyur, or the Damxung Horse Festival, is a Tibetan festival that takes place at the beginning of the eighth month of the lunar calendar (solar September) throughout southern Tibet. The festivities last for ten days with events such as horse racing, bicycle riding contests, and rock-carrying competitions contributing to a time of merriment and celebration.
