= Guarisco =

Guarisco (pronounced [ɡwaˈrisko]) is an Italian surname from Lombardy and Sicily. It might originate from medieval names of Gothic origin, or from auspicious names derived from the verb guarire 'to heal'. Notable people with the surname include:

- Anthony Guarisco Jr. (born 1938), American politician, lawyer and real estate businessman
- Elio Guarisco (1954–2020), Italian writer, translator and Tibetan Buddhist scholar
- Taylor Guarisco, American singer and guitarist

== See also ==
- Guarischi
- Guareschi
