= Namkhai Norbu =

Tibetan Dzogchen master (1938–2018)

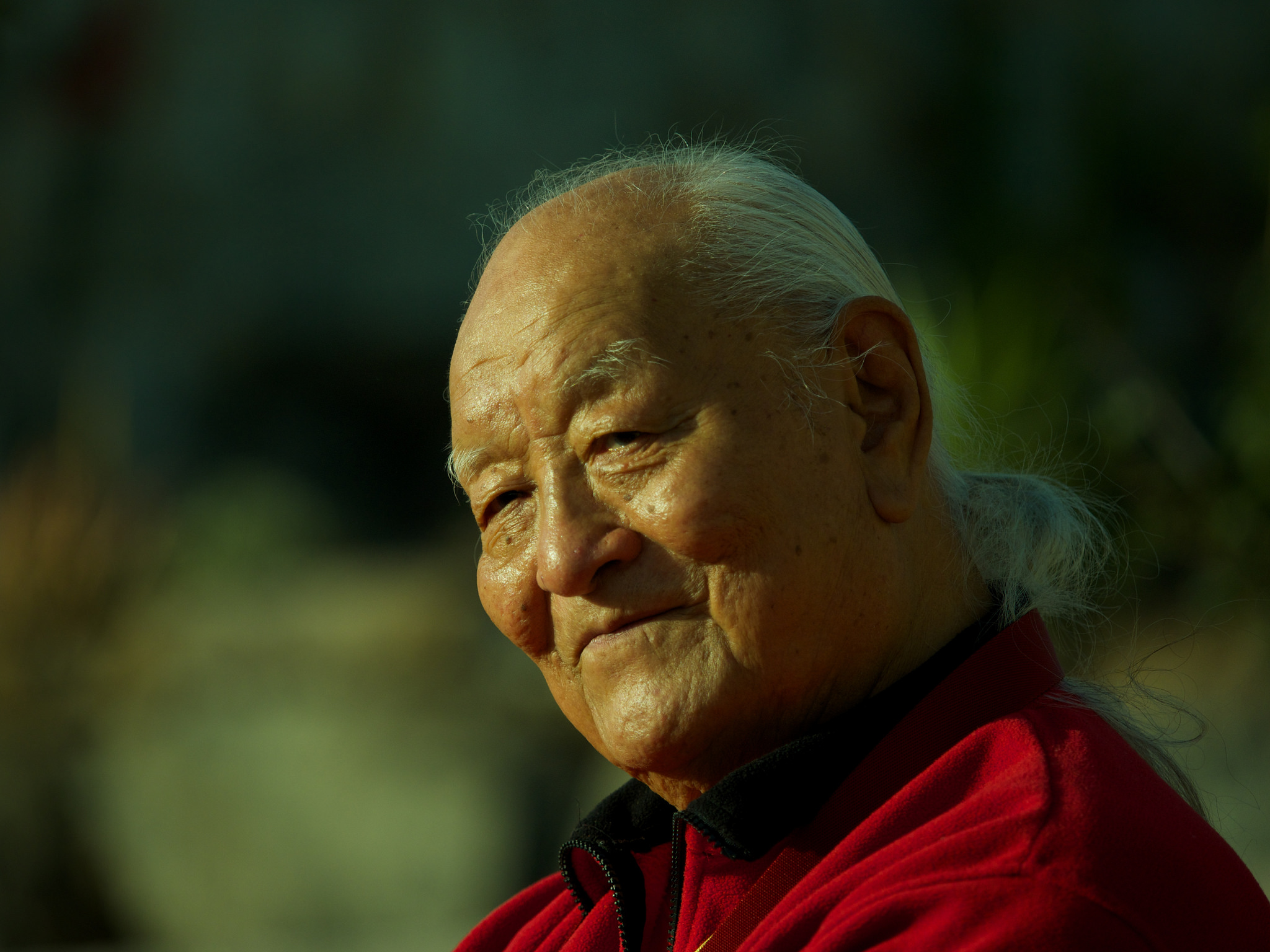
- Norbu in 2015
- Title: Rinpoche, Chögyal

Personal life
- Born: 8 December 1938 Derge, Tibet
- Died: 27 September 2018 (aged 79) Arcidosso, Italy
- Website: dzogchen.net

Religious life
- Religion: Buddhism
- School: Dzogchen

Senior posting
- Teacher: Rigdzin Changchub Dorje

Namkhai Norbu (Tibetan: ནམ་མཁའི་ནོར་བུ་, Wylie: nam mkha’i nor bu; 8 December 1938 – 27 September 2018) was a Tibetan Buddhist master of Dzogchen and a professor of Tibetan and Mongolian language and literature at Naples Eastern University. He was a leading authority on Tibetan culture, particularly in the fields of history, literature, traditional religions (Tibetan Buddhism and Bon), and Traditional Tibetan medicine, having written numerous books and scholarly articles on these subjects.

When he was two years old, Norbu was recognized as the mindstream emanation, a tulku, of the Dzogchen teacher Adzom Drugpa (1842–1924). At five, he was also recognized as a mindstream emanation of an emanation of Shabdrung Ngawang Namgyel (1594–1651). At the age of sixteen, he met master Rigdzin Changchub Dorje (1863–1963), who became his main Dzogchen teacher.

In 1960, he went to Italy at the invitation of Giuseppe Tucci and served as Professor of Tibetan and Mongolian Language and Literature from 1964 to 1992 at Naples Eastern University. In 1983, he hosted the first International Convention on Tibetan Medicine, held in Venice, Italy.

In 1976, Norbu began to give Dzogchen instruction in the West, first in Italy, then in numerous other countries. He became a respected spiritual authority among many practitioners, and created centers for the study of Dzogchen worldwide. Norbu taught Dzogchen for more than fifty years and was considered by the Tibetan government in exile as "the foremost living Dzogchen" teacher at the time of his death, in 2018. Norbu founded the Dzogchen Community, which today has centers around the world, including in the US, Mexico, Australia, Russia, and China.

== Birth ==
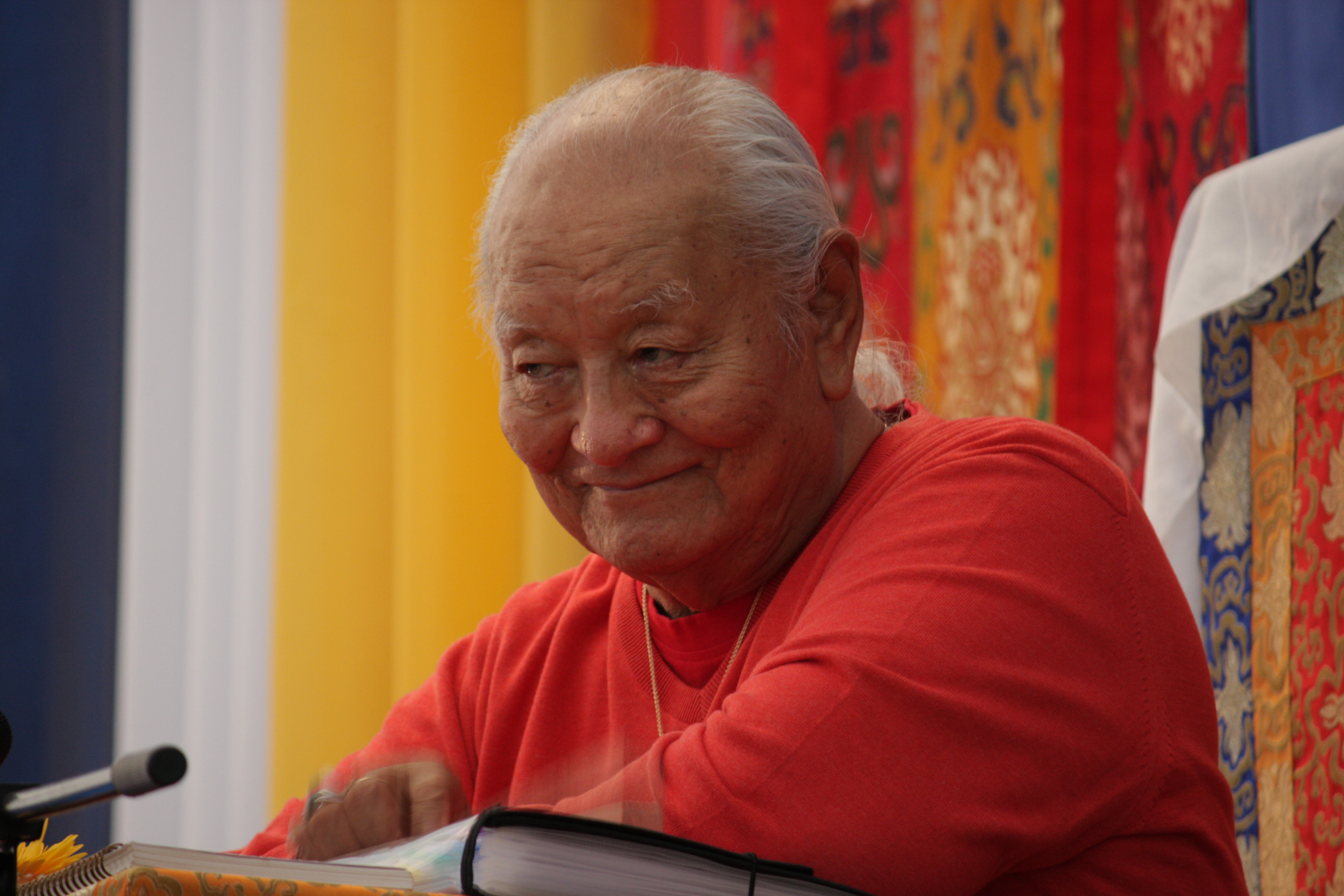
Chögyal Namkhai Norbu at the Kunsangar North center (Moscow region) on 4 July 2013

Namkhai Norbu was born on 8 December 1938 in the village of Ge'u in Derge County. His name, Namkhai, means "sky", "space", and "aether", and has the possessive case ending, thus it may be rendered into English as "...of the sky". Norbu means "jewel", "crystal", "gem", "cintamani". Therefore, Namkhai Norbu may be rendered in English as "jewel of the sky".

== Recognition as a reborn master ==
At birth, two of Norbu's uncles, the Dzogchen masters Palyul Karma Yangsid and Shechen Rabjam, believed him to be the reincarnation of their master, Adzom Drugpa Rinpoche (1841–1934). When Norbu was two years old, this was confirmed by a senior tulku of the Nyingma school. Adzom Drugpa was a disciple both of Jamyang Khyentse Wangpo (1820–92) and Patrul Rinpoche (1808–81).

Furthermore, when he was five years old, the sixteenth Gyalwa Karmapa and the Situ Rinpoche together recognized Norbu as the mind emanation (Note: Mindstream emanations may be either body, voice, mind, quality, or activity emanations.) of the mindstream of another well-known teacher, who was in turn the emanation of Shabdrung Ngawang Namgyel, the 17th-century Tibetan-born founder and spiritual leader of Bhutan. Because of this, Namkhai Norbu also bears the honorary title 'Chögyal' (Tibetan: ཆོས་རྒྱལ་, Wylie: chos rgyal), meaning 'Dharma King'. (Note: While the title Chögyal is more commonly associated with the monarchy of Sikkim (now a state in far-northern India) it is also conferred upon recognized mindstream emanations of Ngawang Namgyel, the lama who first unified the country.)

Such recognitions conferred a great deal of attention and prestige upon him from a very young age, leading him in later life to remark: "As I grew up, I was thus given quite a few names and titles, many of which are very long and grand-sounding. But I have never used them, because I have always preferred the name my parents gave me at birth".

== Tibet ==
In his early years, Norbu studied at the Derge Gonchen monastery. At the age of nine, he entered a Sakya college, where he studied Buddhist philosophy for many years with Khyenrab Chökyi Odzer. He also received numerous tantric and Dzogchen transmissions and teachings from many masters, including his paternal uncle Togden Ugyen Tendzin, his maternal uncle Khyentse Rinpoche Chökyi Wangchug, as well as Drubwang Rinpoche Kunga Palden, Negyab Rinpoche, Drugse Gyurmed Dorje, Dzongsar Khyentse Chökyi Lodrö, Dudjom Rinpoche Yeshe Dorje, and Bo Gongkar Rinpoche. He also received teachings at Dzogchen Monastery. In 1951, he received various teachings from the female yogi Ayu Khandro Dorje Paldrön (1838–1953).

Norbu was invited to China in 1953 as a representative of the Tibetan monasteries. After visiting Chengdu and Chungching, he accepted an invitation to teach Classical Tibetan in Menyag and also had the opportunity to learn Chinese there. During this time, he met Kangkar Rinpoche, from whom he received instruction on the Six Yogas of Naropa, and other teachings.

After having had a vision in a dream, Norbu returned to Derge. It was here that he met his root teacher, Rigdzin Changchub Dorje, in 1955 (when Norbu was sixteen). He stayed at Dorje's residence in Khamdogar for six months, and it was under this teacher that Norbu gained real experiential knowledge of Dzogchen.

Changchub Dorje was a disciple of Adzom Drugpa, Nyagla Padma Dündul, and Shardza Trashi Gyaltsen Rinpoche (1859–1935), and was the leader of a small community of lay practitioners, as well as a doctor of Tibetan medicine. From Changchub Dorje, Norbu received authentic transmissions of all three series of Dzogchen (Semde, Longde, and Menngagde).

== Italy ==
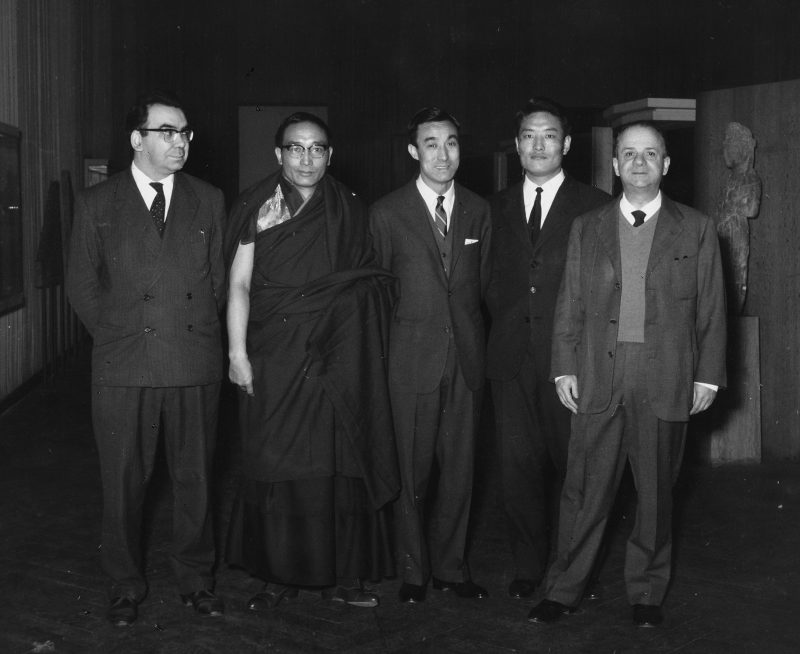
From left: Lionello Lanciotti (professor of Chinese Studies), Geshe Jampel Singe, Lobsang Samten, Chögyal Namkhai Norbu, Luciano Petech, IsMEO, Rome, 1961

In the late 1950s, Norbu made a pilgrimage that took him to central Tibet, India, Bhutan, and Nepal. Because of the turmoil and aftermath of the 1959 Tibetan Rebellion, he could not return to Derge from Sikkim, so he stayed as a refugee in Gangtok, working as a writer and editor of Tibetan literature for the Chogyal government from 1958 to 1960. It was here that he met with the Italian Tibetologist Giuseppe Tucci. Also during his time in Sikkim, he met and received teachings from the XVI Gyalwa Karmapa.

Already recognized as a knowledgeable figure in all aspects of Tibetan culture at the age of 22, Norbu was invited to Italy by Giuseppe Tucci to work at the Institute for the Middle and Far East (IsMEO) in Rome for two years. He collaborated with Tucci and Geshe Jempel Senghe on a catalogue and library of Tibetan texts.

In 1962, he took up a post in Naples at the Istituto Universitario Orientale, where he taught the Tibetan language and literature until 1992. Namkhai Norbu focused his research on the ancient history of Tibet, the Shang Shung kingdom, and the Bön tradition. His research included works on history, Tibetan medicine, astrology, Bön, and Tibetan folk traditions.

Norbu married Rosa Tolli in 1968. They had a son, Yeshi Silvano Namkhai (born in 1970), and a daughter, Yuchen Namkhai (born in 1971).

== Teaching Dzogchen in the West ==
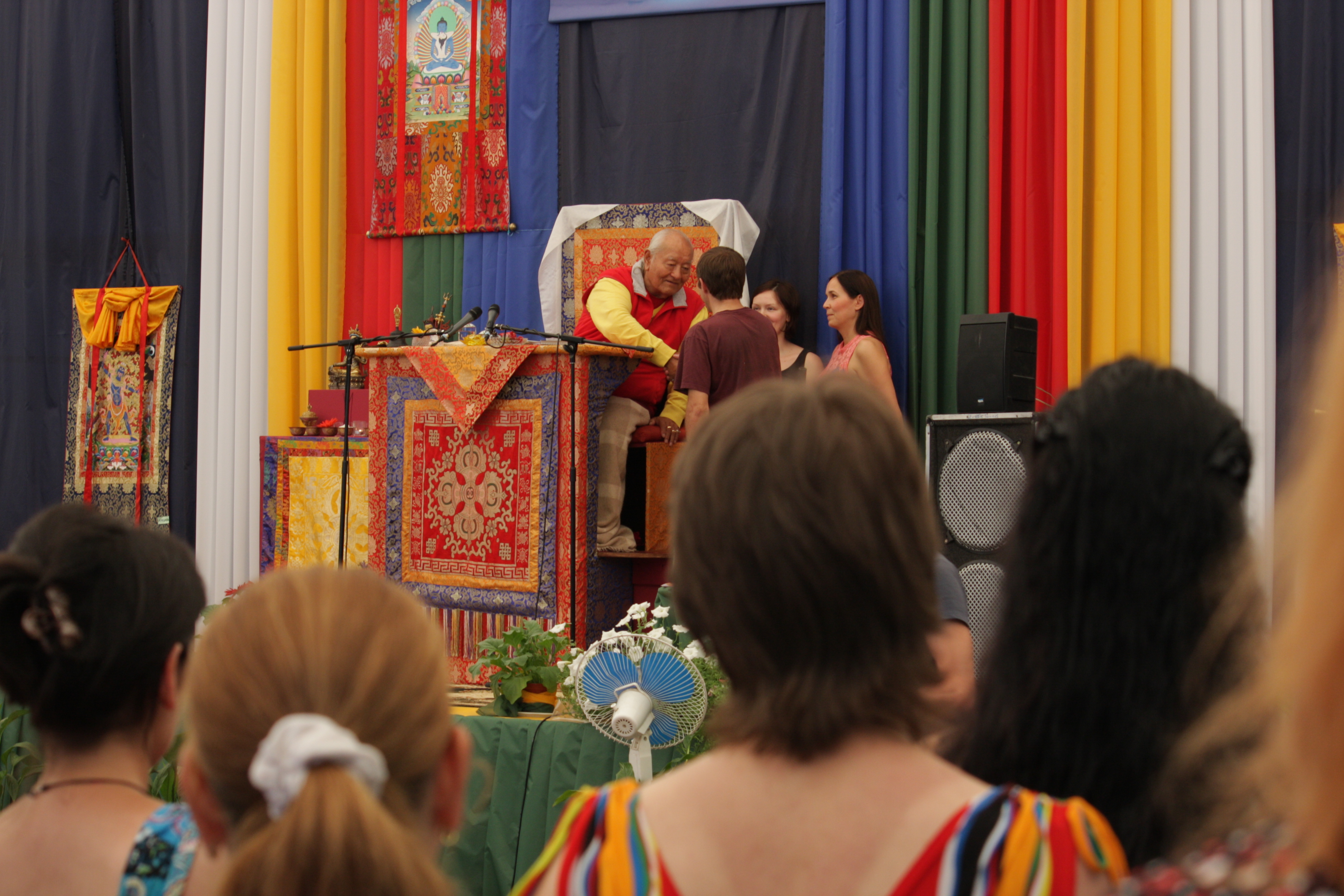
Chögyal Namkhai Norbu in Moscow, 2013

In 1971, Norbu began to teach an ancient Tibetan form of physical yoga he called Yantra Yoga (Tibetan:Trul Khor). This system is based on the Dzogchen tantra called The Union of the Sun and Moon and uses physical postures, breathing, and visualization to harmonize one's energy and relax the mind. Starting in 1976, Norbu began to teach Dzogchen to a small group of Italian students. During this time, Dzogchen was barely known in the West, and Norbu worked to make it accessible to modern Western students.

As interest in his teachings grew, Norbu dedicated himself to teaching Dzogchen throughout the world through his growing "Dzogchen Community" (Wylie: rdzogs chen 'dus sde). The first "gar" (gathering, settlement) of the DC was established in 1981, near Arcidosso, in Tuscany. It was called Merigar ("Community of the Mountain-of-Fire").

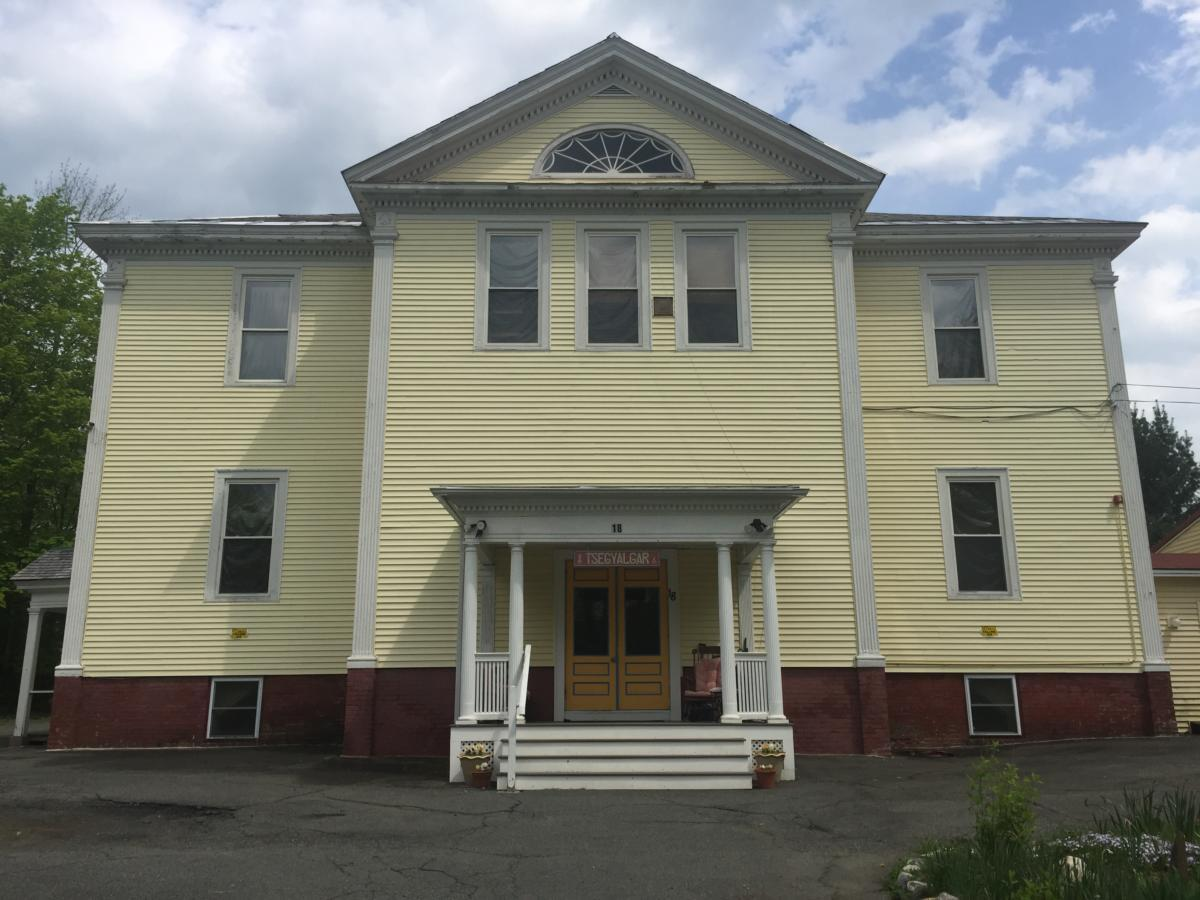
Tsegyalgar East in 2018

The Dzogchen Community would eventually grow to include thousands of members in over forty countries, including in Europe, Australia, Asia, North America, and South America. The main DC Gars were: Merigar West in Italy and Merigar East in Romania; Tsegyalgar East in Massachusetts, USA and Tsegyalgar West in Baja California, Mexico; Tashigar North in Venezuela and Tashigar South in Argentina; Namgyalgar in New South Wales, Australia, and Kunsangar in Ukraine and Russia.

Norbu continued to travel around the world, giving Dzogchen teachings. He held over 600 Dzogchen retreats throughout his life. Since 2005, some of these teachings were also transmitted worldwide via the internet. Norbu also developed a system of study and contemplative training for his students, which he called Santi Maha Sangha.

In the 1980s, Norbu also began to reveal a new series of Dzogchen teachings (i.e., a terma cycle) called Longsal. These terma revelations have been translated and published in ten volumes.

In 2002, Norbu oversaw the establishment of the Ka-Ter translation project, which tasked experienced translators such as Adriano Clemente, Elio Guarisco, and Jim Valby with the translation from Tibetan of key texts, as well as the works of Norbu himself.

== Other projects ==
In 1983, Norbu organized the First International Congress on Tibetan Medicine, which was held at Ca' Foscari University in Venice and the Cini Foundation, Arcidosso. Norbu also convened the first three International Conferences on Tibetan Language, held at various major universities.

Apart from his spiritual activity, he founded the International Shang-Shung Institute for Tibetan Studies in 1990 to preserve the cultural traditions of Tibet (including Tibetan medicine and language). The institute has a large collection of Tibetan books and manuscripts, and it also publishes the works of Namkhai Norbu. The institute was inaugurated by the XIV Dalai Lama in 1990. In 2005, the Shang Shung Medical Institute began to offer a four-year course in traditional Tibetan medicine.

Norbu also founded the NGO A.S.I.A (Association for International Solidarity in Asia), which works in Tibet, India, Nepal, Myanmar, Mongolia, and Sri Lanka. A.S.I.A. has worked on more than 200 projects, including building twenty schools, where 3,000 Tibetan children learn Tibetan language and culture.

== Recognition and legacy ==
Chögyal Namkhai Norbu's teachings on the Dance of the Vajra and Khaita Joyful Dances (a program based on the study, singing, and dancing of traditional and modern Tibetan songs) have been recognized at UNESCO's International Dance Council (CID). The numerous cultural artifacts collected by Norbu, such as valuable Himalayan and Central Asian works of art, sacred objects, documents, and handicrafts, are now in the collection of the Museum of Asian Art and Culture in Arcidosso (2016).

In 2000, Norbu was invited to the UN's Millennium World Peace Conference of Religious and Spiritual Leaders in New York.

On 10 September 2018, the Italian government conferred upon him its highest award, Commander of the Order of Merit of the Italian Republic; this was presented by President Sergio Mattarella.

== Works ==
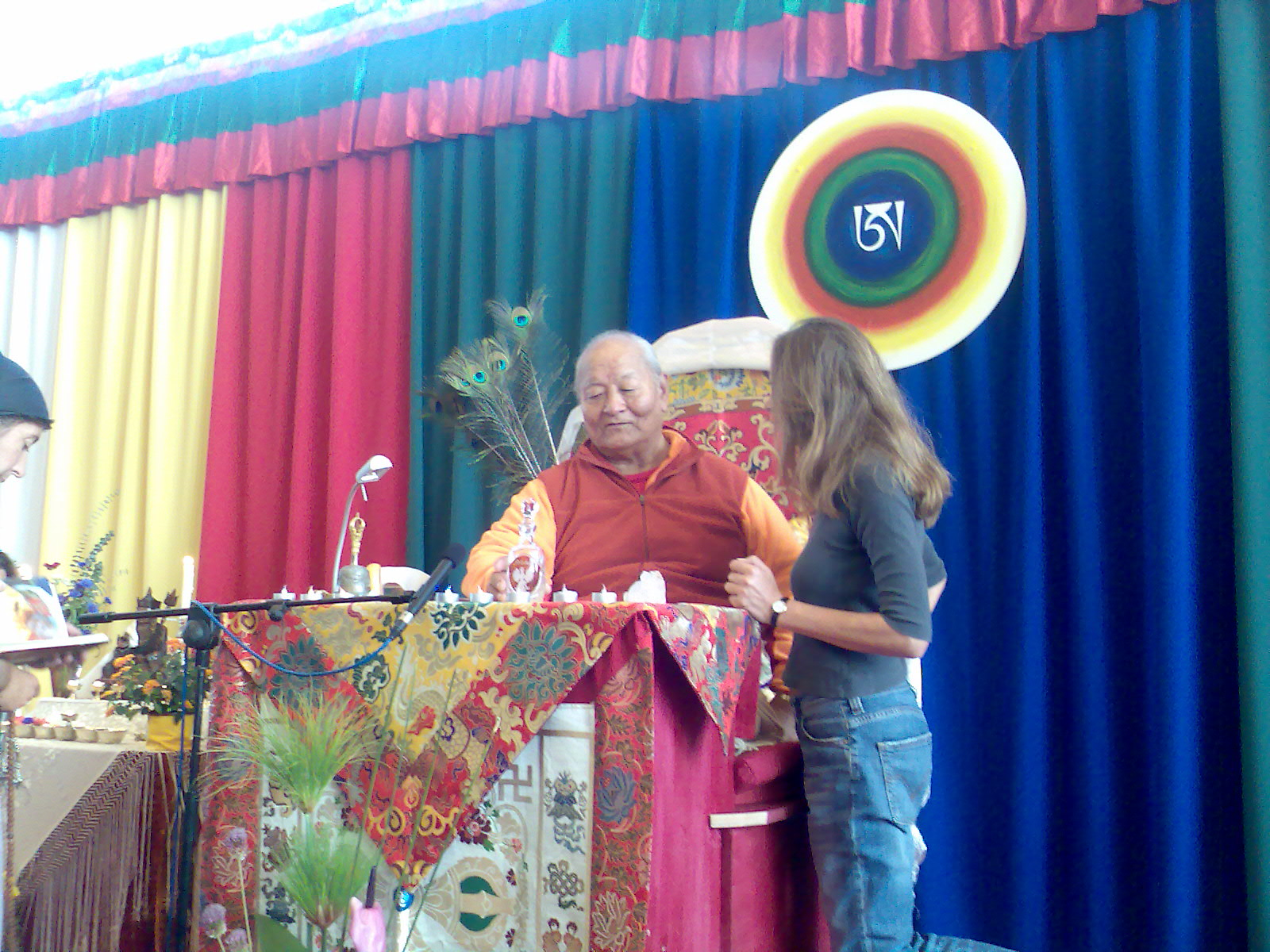
Namkhai Norbu in 2006

Chögyal Namkhai Norbu wrote more than eighty works, which have been translated into numerous languages. His oeuvre includes books on Tibetan Buddhism, Tibetan history, poetry, biographies, and works on Tibetan culture and Tibetan medicine.

=== Books ===
- The Necklace of Zi. Shang Shung Edizioni. 1981.
- Yantra Yoga: the Tibetan Yoga of Movement. Snow Lion. 1982. ISBN 1-55939-308-4.
- Journey into the Culture of Tibetan Nomads. Shang Shung Edizioni. 1983.
- The Mirror: Advice on the Presence of Awareness. Shang Shung Edizioni. 1983.
- On Birth and Life: A Treatise on Tibetan Medicine. Shang-Shung Edizioni. 1983.
- The Cycle of Day and Night: Where One Proceeds Along the Path of the Primordial Yoga. Blue Dolphin. 1984. ISBN 0-89581-080-8.
- Dzogchen and Zen. Blue Dolphin. 1984. ISBN 0-931892-08-2.
- The Small Collection of Hidden Precepts: A Study of An Ancient Manuscript on Dzogchen from Tun-huang. Shang Shung Edizioni. 1984.
- Rigbai Kujnug. The Six Vajra Verses. An Oral Commentary. Singapore: Rinchen Editions. 1985.
- Zernga: The Five Principal Points. Shang Shung Edizioni. 1985.
- The Crystal and the Way of Light: Sutra, Tantra and Dzogchen. Penguin Books. 1986. ISBN 1-55939-135-9.
- The Four Contemplations of the Semde. Shang Shung Edizioni. 1986.
- The Little Song of "Do As You Please". Shang Shung Edizioni. 1986.
- Answer to Sixteen Questions. Shang Shung Edizioni. 1987.
- The Cycle of Day and Night: An Essential Tibetan Text on the Practice of Contemplation. Station Hill Press. 1987. ISBN 0-88268-040-4.
- Primordial Experience: An Introduction to Rdzogs-Chen Meditation. Shambhala. 1987. ISBN 0-87773-372-4.
- Dzogchen: The Self-Perfected State. Shang Shung Edizioni. 1989. ISBN 1-55939-057-3.
- Mi-Lam: The Dream Practice. Shang Shung Edizioni. 1989.
- The Voice of the Bee. Shang Shung Edizioni. 1989.
- The Dzogchen Ritual Practices. London: Kailash Editions. 1991.
- The Practice of Sinhamuka. Shang Shung Edizioni. 1991.
- The Authentic Principle of the Ati Dzogchen Community. Shang Shung Edizioni. 1992.
- Dream Yoga and the Practice of Natural Light. Snow Lion. 1992. ISBN 978-1-55939-007-1.
- The Song of the Vajra. Station Hill Press. 1992.
- Three Songs for Disciples of Changchub Dorje. Shang Shung Edizioni. 1992.
- Examination Questions for the Base of Santi Maha Sangha. Shang Shung Edizioni. 1993.
- The Practice for the Naga. Shang Shung Edizioni. 1993.
- The Wish-Fulflling Vase: Instructions on the Base of Santi Maha Sangha. Shang Shung Edizioni. 1993.
- The Treasure That Introduces Knowledge of Ati Contemplation: First level of Santi Maha Sangha. Shang Shung Edizioni. 1994.
- Drung, Deu and Bön. Paljor. 1995. ISBN 81-85102-93-7.
- From the Depth of my Heart to my Mother. Shang Shung Edizioni. 1995.
- Santi Maha Sangha Kumar Kumari Base Level: The Opening of the Eye of Wisdom. Shang Shung Edizioni. 1995.
- Dzogchen: The Self-Perfected State. Snow Lion. 1996. ISBN 978-1-55939-057-6.
- Instructions for the Second Level Practices of Santi Maha Sangha. Shang Shung Edizioni. 1996.
- The Mirror: Advice on the Presence of Awareness. Station Hill Press. 1996. ISBN 1-886449-10-4.
- The Opening of the Door of Intelligence: First Level of Santi Maha Sangha Kumar Kumari. Shang Shung Edizioni. 1996.
- The Treasure of Primordial Bodhichitta: Second Level of Santi Maha Sangha. Shang Shung Edizioni. 1996.
- The Mirror of a Clear Mind: Second Level of Santi Maha Sangha Kumar Kumari. Shang Shung Edizioni. 1997.
- The Ati Treasure of Dharmadhatu: Third Level of Santi Maha Sangha. Shang Shung Edizioni. 1998.
- The Practice of Narag Tongtrug. Shang Shung Edizioni. 1998.
- Direct Introduction to the State of AtiYoga. Shang Shung Edizioni. 1999.
- The Eight Movements of Yantra Yoga. Snow Lion. 1999.
- The Practice of Long Life of the Immortal Dakini Mandarava. Shang Shung Edizioni. 1999.
- The Precious Vase: Instructions on the Base of Santi Maha Sangha. Shang Shung Edizioni. 1999.
- Songs from the Hospital and Other Poems. Shang Shung Edizioni. 1999.
- The Supreme Source: the Fundamental Tantra of the Dzogchen Semde. Snow Lion. 1999. ISBN 1-55939-120-0.
- The Garuda Practice. Shang Shung Edizioni. 2000.
- The Transference to Purify the Dimensions of the Three Kayas. Shang Shung Edizioni. 2000.
- Concise Experiential Instructions on the Short Thun As a Daily Practise for the Dzogchen Community. Shang Shung Edizioni. 2001.
- The Dzogchen Community. Shang Shung Edizioni. 2001.
- Dzogchen Teachings in Gutenstein, Austria. Shang Shung Edizioni. 2001.
- Dzogchen Teachings: Merigar, 6–11 July 2001. Shang Shung Edizioni. 2001.
- Longde Teachings: Based on the Original Texts by Vairochana and Dzin Dharmabodhi. Shang Shung Edizioni. 2001.
- The Yoga of Arya Tara. Shang Shung Edizioni. 2001.
- An Introduction to the Practice of Contemplation. Shang Shung Edizioni. 2002.
- Journey Among the Tibetan Nomads. Paljor. 2002. ISBN 81-86470-10-7.
- The Cycle of Day and Night and the Upadesha of Vajrasattva. Shang Shung Edizioni. 2003.
- Key for Consulting the Tibetan Calendar. Shang Shung Edizioni. 2003. ISBN 978-88-7834-123-4.
- A Wondrous Sight (with Elio Guarisco). Shang Shung Edizioni. 2003.
- The Practice in Daily Life. Shang Shung Edizioni. 2004.
- The Practice of Self-Liberation of the Causes of the Six Lokas. Shang Shung Edizioni. 2004.
- The Twenty-Seven Commitments. Shang Shung Edizioni. 2004.
- The Foundation of the Path. Shang Shung Edizioni. 2005.
- A Dream from the Display of the Moon in the Water. Shang Shung Edizioni. 2006.
- Dzogchen Teachings. Snow Lion Publications. 2006. ISBN 978-1-55939-243-3.
- Dzogchen Teachings: Oral Commentary on the Longsal Terma The Opening of the Gate to the State of Ati. Shang Shung Edizioni. 2006.
- Teachers' Training. Shang Shung Edizioni. 2006.
- A Short Purification Ritual for the Dead as a Supplement to the Shitro of the Space Teachings. Shang Shung. 2007.
- The Ati Treasury of Contemplation. Shang Shung Edizioni. 2008.
- Dzogchen Teachings at Sinabelkirchen, Austria. Shang Shung Edizioni. 2008.
- Natural Perfection: Longchenpa's Radical Dzogchen. Translated by Keith Dowman. Wisdom Publications. 2010. ISBN 978-0-86171-640-1.
- The Four Methods of Development. Shang Shung Edizioni. 2011.
- Healing with Fire: A Practical Manual of Tibetan Moxibustion. Shang Shung Edizioni. 2011. ISBN 978-88-7834-113-5.
- The Lamp That Enlightens Narrow Minds: The Life and Times of a Realized Tibetan Master. North Atlantic Books. 2012. ISBN 978-1-58394-492-9.
- Rainbow Body: The Life and Realization of a Tibetan Yogin, Togden Ugyen Tendzin. North Atlantic Books. 2012. ISBN 978-1-58394-491-2.
- Small Glossary for the Dzogchen Community. Shang Shung Edizioni. 2012.
- A History of Zhang Zhung and Tibet: The Early Period. Vol. 1. North Atlantic Books. 2013. ISBN 978-1-58394-610-7.
- The Vision of Clear Light and the Crucial Points of Dzogchen Practice. Shang Shung Edizioni. 2013.
- The Practice of Guru Medicine Buddha. Shang Shung Edizioni. 2014.
- The Temple of the Great Contemplation: The Gonpa of Merigar. Shang Shung Edizioni. 2014.

=== Contributions ===
- Introduction: Beyond Words: Dzogchen Made Easy (2003) (Element Books) ISBN 978-0-00-711677-5
- Introduction: Self-Liberation: Through Seeing with Naked Awareness (2000) (Station Hill Press) ISBN 0-88268-058-7
- Introduction: The Tibetan Book of the Dead: Awakening Upon Dying (2013) ISBN 978-1-58394-555-1
- Introduction: The Golden Letters (1996) (Snow Lion) ISBN 1-55939-050-6
- Introduction: Togden Shakya Shri. The Life and Liberation of a Tibetan Yogin (2009) (Shang Shung Edizioni) ISBN 978-88-7834-103-6
- Introduction: You Are the Eyes of the World (2011) (Shambhala ) ISBN 978-1-55939-367-6

=== Discography ===
- Chöd: Cutting Through Dualism (1995) CD (Amiata Records) ARNR-0193
- Purification of the Six Lokas (2001) CD (Shang Shung) 10020
- General Introduction to Dzogchen (2009) DVD
- Music for the Dance of the Vajra (2009) CD (Amiata Records) ARNR-0200
- My Reincarnation (2012) DVD (New York) ISBN 978-1-4229-1874-6

== See also ==
- Lucid dream
- My Reincarnation – a documentary film by Jennifer Fox
- Rimé movement
- Six realms
- Zhitro
