= Hor Lhamo =

Hor Lhamo (late 19th – early 20th century) was a Tibetan woman from Kham, on Tibetan territory. She rebelled against local lords and collaborating officials as well as against Chinese influence, at a time when the region was still Tibetan and independent. Her actions are one of the few known examples of female resistance against patriarchal oppression and external interference in Tibetan history.

Qinghai, now in Northwestern China used to be under the dominion of Tibet, and the feudal government at Lhasa required payment of tribute from the local nomadic serfs. Hor Lhamo's family suffered under these requirements and in 1918 led a delegation representing 150 families to the local ruler to protest the excessive taxation. This was refused and Lhamo returned with what has been described as a peasant army.

Lhamo's army defeated the Tibetan authorities, taking 45 soldiers prisoner and killing the local ruler. The Tibetan government responded by sending a superior force to restore order. Lhamo's revolt was subdued and she was executed.
