= Kingdom of Tibet =

Kingdom of Tibet might refer to:

- Tibetan Empire
- Tibet (1912–1951)
