= 3rd Taktra Rinpoche =

Tibetan regent and Buddhist monk (1874–1952)

Ngawang Sungrab Thutob
- སྟག་བྲག་ནག་དབང་གསུང་རབ
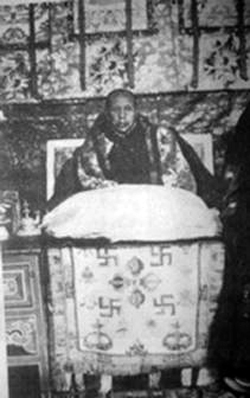

3rd Taktra Rinpoche
- In office 1874–1952
- Preceded by: Lobsang Khyenrab Wangchug
- Succeeded by: Tenzin Geleg

Regent of Tibet
- In office 1941–1950
- Dalai Lama: Tenzin Gyatso
- Preceded by: 5th Reting Rinpoche
- Succeeded by: title abolished

Personal details
- Born: 1874 Kyarpa, Tibet, China
- Died: 1952 (aged 77–78) Lhasa, Tibet, China

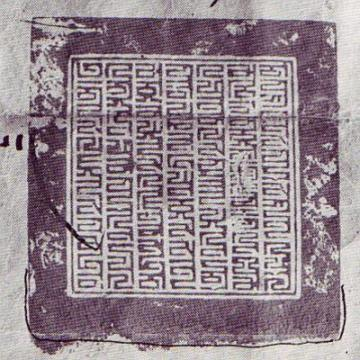
Seal of Taktra Rinpoche

Ngawang Sungrab Thutob (Standard Tibetan: སྟག་བྲག་ནག་དབང་གསུང་རབ།; Chinese: 达扎·阿旺松绕) (1874–1952) was the third Taktra Rinpoche, (Wylie transliteration: sTag-brag, also Takdrak, Tagdrag, etc.) who assumed the regency of Tibet's de facto state in 1941, after succeeding the fifth Reting Rinpoche, Jamphel Yeshe Gyaltsen. After an alleged attempt to rise a rebellion, Gyaltsen was imprisoned in the Potala Palace, where he died under mysterious circumstances.

State-controlled media in China claims that Thutob was responsible for the death of Jamphel Yeshe Gyaltsen. The 5th Reting Rinpoche was praised as a patriot and devout Buddhist, whereas Ngawang Sungrab Thutob was called a "pro-Britain, pro-slavery separatist." Gyaltsen was responsible for discovering Tenzin Gyatso and enthroning him as the 14th Dalai Lama, and had been the first appointed teacher of 14th Dalai Lama. Following the 5th Reting Rimpoche's regency, the third Taktra Rinpoche became responsible for the raising and education of the 14th Dalai Lama.

== 4th Taktra ==
The 4th Taktra or Dagzhag (dharma name: Tenzin Geleg; Standard Tibetan: བསྟན་འཛིན་དགེ་ལེགས་; Chinese: 达扎·单增格列, 丹增格列 or 丹增赤烈) was born in 1955 (or 1954). He was recognized and named by the 14th Dalai Lama in 1958 (or 1957), about a year before the latter's escape to India.

Even though the 3rd Taktra's negative portrait in China, the 4th Taktra studied under the Chinese curriculum. He became a member of the 6th council of the Buddhist Association of China and the Vice President of Tibetan Sub-Association of Buddhist Association of China. He was quoted by Chinese press to have pejoratively labeled the Dalai Lama's supporters as the "Dalai Group":

"A few temple monks, following the scriptures poorly, do not comply with religious teachings; undermine religious order; promote anarchy; and, echoing with the Dalai clique, encourage separatist activities, sabotage Tibet's stability, damage the normal order of Tibetan Buddhism, doing evil to the religious community and the majority of believers, as well as the fundamental interests of Buddhism. We will never agree with their views and will strongly oppose them."

("少数寺庙僧人不好好学经，不遵守教规，破坏宗教正常秩序，目无国法，与达赖集团遥相呼应，大搞分裂祖国活动，破坏西藏稳定，破坏藏传佛教正常秩序，损坏了宗教界和广大信教群众的根本利益，我们决不答应，坚决反对。")
