= Tenzin Jigme =

Tibetan tulku and monk (1948–1997)

Tenzin Jigme (Thutob Wangchuk) (Lhasa, 1948 – February 13, 1997) was a Tibetan tulku and the sixth Reting Rinpoche.

His reincarnation is recognized by the Tibetan government in exile. His recognition is being challenged by another sixth Reting Rinpoche who acts by the title of Reting Hutukthu; hutukthu equal to rinpoche and mainly in use in Mongolia.

== Life ==
Tenzin Jigme was identified as the reincarnation of the fifth Reting Rinpoche Jamphel Yeshe Gyaltsen in 1951 and enthroned in 1955.

In 1956 (eight years old) he was the first to be assigned to the Tibet Committee of the Buddhist Association of China.

Jigme stayed in Tibet when the Tibetan government went in exile in 1959 during the Tibetan diaspora. During the Cultural Revolution (1966–1976) he was publicly denounced by the authorities because of his religious position. Next he was imprisoned for one year. Later he was rehabilitated and at the end of the 1970s he was appointed to several official posts. Comparably with the tenth Panchen Lama he was married and lived as a layman.

His next reincarnation was appointed by the People's Republic of China. This reincarnation is not recognized by the (itself unrecognized) Central Tibetan Administration in exile.
