= Guareschi =

Guareschi (pronounced [ɡwaˈreski]) is an Italian surname from northern Italy, particularly Parma. It might originate from medieval names of Gothic origin, or from auspicious names derived from the verb guarire 'to heal'. Notable people with the surname include:

- Giovannino Guareschi (1908–1968), Italian journalist, cartoonist and humorist
- Icilio Guareschi (1847–1918), Italian chemist
- Vittoriano Guareschi (born 1971), Italian motorcycle racer

== See also ==
- Guarischi
- Guarisco
