= Jamphel Yeshe Gyaltsen =

Tibetan monk (1912–1947)

Thubten Jamphel Yeshe Gyaltsen
- ཐུབ་བསྟན་འཇམ་དཔལ་ཡེ་ཤེས་རྒྱལ་མཚན་
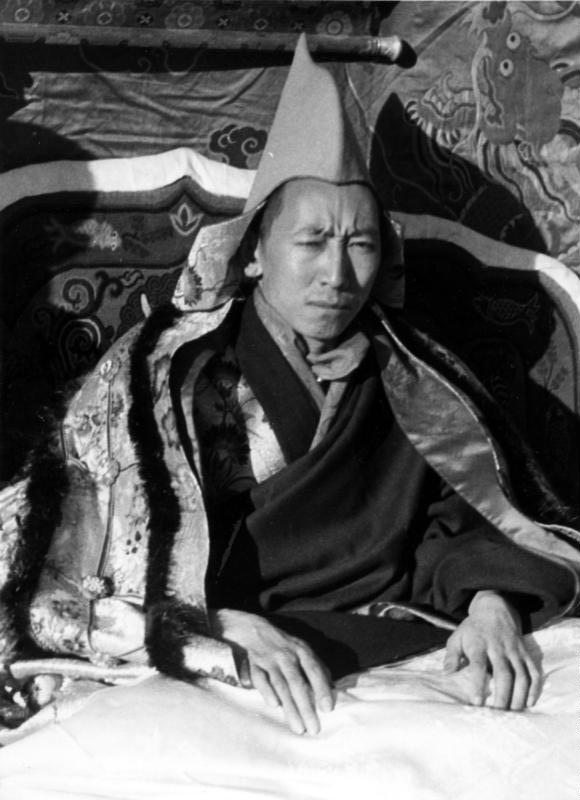
- Gyaltsen in 1938

5th Reting Rinpoche
- In office 1930–1947
- Preceded by: Ngawang Lobsang Yeshe Tenpai Gyaltsen
- Succeeded by: Tenzin Jigme Thutob Wangchuk

Regent of Tibet
- In office 1934–1941
- Dalai Lama: Tenzin Gyatso
- Preceded by: vacant (last: 3rd Tsomonling Rinpoche
- Succeeded by: 3rd Taktra Rinpoche

Personal details
- Born: 1912 Dagpo, Gyaca, Tibet, Qing dynasty
- Died: 1947 (aged 34–35) Lhasa, Tibet

(Thubten) Jamphel Yeshe Gyaltsen or Thupten Jampel Yishey Gyantsen, (Tibetan: ཐུབ་བསྟན་འཇམ་དཔལ་ཡེ་ཤེས་རྒྱལ་མཚན་, Wylie: thub-bstan 'jam-dpal ye-shes rgyal-mtshan; 1912–1947) was a Tibetan tulku and the fifth Reting Rinpoche.

== Life ==
Gyantsen played a significant role in Tibetan history as the one-time regent of the present (14th) Dalai Lama. On 26 January 1940, Gyantsen requested the Central Government of China to exempt Lhamo Dhondup from lot-drawing process using Golden Urn to become the 14th Dalai Lama. The request was approved by the Central Government. He was forced out of office and was succeeded in the beginning of 1941 by Taktra Rinpoche. Subsequently, he was alleged to have organized an uprising against his replacement. He died in 1947 in the prisons of Lhasa's Potala, apparently the victim of poisoning. His jailor also allegedly reported that his testicles were bound and beaten until he died of the pain.

The episode exposed a number of the political dimensions of the religious hierarchy in Lhasa. Critics of the fifth Reting Rinpoche accused him of widespread corruption, and involvement with married women as a monk. Defenders alleged that his imprisonment was partly the result of his attraction to the teachings of the Nyingma lineage, a politically sensitive orientation, and that the case against him had been fabricated by the cabinet minister Kapshopa.

His successor was Tenzin Jigme Thutob Wangchuk as the sixth Reting Rinpoche, although this was challenged by another claimant, who styles himself Reting Hutukthu.
