= Elio Guarisco =

Italian writer (1954–2020)

Elio Guarisco (August 5, 1954 - November 27, 2020) was an Italian writer, translator, Tibetan Buddhist scholar, and Dzogchen practitioner, member of the International Dzogchen Community.

== Life ==
Guarisco was born in Varese, Italy. After spending his formative years in Como, he went on to study art and receive a Master of Arts before traveling to India to study Buddhism.

In the early 1970s, he studied under the auspices of several Theravada leaders in India including Satya Narayan Goenka. He later studied Buddhist philosophy in a Tibetan monastery in Switzerland for ten years, after which he was invited by Kalu Rinpoche to work as a translator in Sonada, India where he stayed for twenty years. In the meantime he met in Italy his teacher Chögyal Namkhai Norbu, becoming an active member of the Dzogchen community in 1986.

He served as a coordinator of the Ka-ter Translation Project, as well as an instructor of the Santi Maha Sangha program. He was a founding member of the Shang Shung Institute in Italy. During the last years of his life, he also taught the application of meditation to daily life to any who were interested. He taught meditation and contemplation all over the world: including Europe, Russia, China, Australia, the US, Mexico, and Latin America.

Elio Guarisco died in November 2020 of COVID-19 in Como, Italy.

== Translations ==
- The Treasury of Knowledge: Book Six, Part Four (2005)
- The Treasury of Knowledge: Book Eight, Part Three (2008)
- Healing with Fire: A Practical Manual of Tibetan Moxibustion (2011)
- Longchenpa's Advice from the Heart (2011)
- Togden Shakya Shri: The Life and Liberation of a Tibetan Yogin (2012)
- Creative Vision and Inner Reality by Jamgon Kongtrul Lodrö Thaye (2012)
- The Tibetan Book of the Dead: Awakening Upon Dying (2013)
- The Marvelous Primordial State. The Mejung Tantra. A Fundamental Scripture of Dzogchen Semde - together with Adriano Clemente and Jim Valby (2013)
- The Secret Map Of The Body: Visions Of The Human Energy Structure by Gyalwa Yangönpa (2015)
- The Life and Teaching of A Tibetan Master (in Italian)
- The Autobiography of the 84 Tantric Masters of India (in Italian)
- The Lifestory of Kunga Lekpa (in Italian)
- Myriad Worlds
- Buddhist Ethics
- The Indestructibe Way
- The Lifestory of Shakya Shri
- Three volumes on Tibetan Medicine:
  - The Silver Mirror
  - Tibetan Medicine Applied in an Easy Way
  - Universal Benefit, the Practice of Kunye the Tibetan Massage.

Other works:

- When the Garuda Flew to the West (autobiography)
- Healing with Yantra Yoga. From Tibetan Medicine to the Subtle Body - together with Puntsog Wangmo (2016)
