= Tibet (1912–1951) =

Former de facto state in East Asia

Tibet བོད་ Bod
- 1912–1951
- Flag Coat of arms
- Anthem: "Gyallu"
- Territorial extent of Tibet in 1946
- Status: De facto independent state
- Capital and largest city: Lhasa
- Official languages: Tibetan, Tibetic languages
- Religion: Tibetan Buddhism (official)
- Demonym: Tibetan
- Government: Tibetan dual system of government
- Dalai Lama
  - 1912–1933 (first): Thubten Gyatso
  - 1937–1951 (last): Tenzin Gyatso
- Regent
  - 1934–1941 (first): Thubten Jamphel Yeshe Gyaltsen
  - 1941–1950 (last): Ngawang Sungrab Thutob
- Kalön Tripa
  - 1912–1920 (first): Chankhyim Trekhang Thupten Shakya
  - 1950–1951 (last): Lobsang Tashi
- Legislature: None (rule by decree)
- History
  - Declaration of Independence: 4 April 1912
  - Three Point Agreement: 12 August 1912
  - 13th Dalai Lama returns: January 1913
  - Simla Convention signed with Britain: 3 July 1914
  - Battle of Chamdo: October 1950
  - Seventeen Point Agreement: 23 May 1951

Area
  - Total: 1,221,600 km^{2} (471,700 sq mi)

Population
  - 1945: 1,000,000
- Currency: Skar, srang, tangka
Preceded by	Succeeded by
Tibet under Qing rule	Tibet Area (administrative division); Central Tibetan Administration
- Today part of: China ∟ Tibet Autonomous Region

Tibet (Tibetan: བོད་, Wylie: Bod) was a de facto independent state in East Asia that lasted from the collapse of the Qing dynasty in 1912 until its annexation by the People's Republic of China in 1951.

The Ganden Phodrang based in Central Tibet was a protectorate under Qing rule. In 1912 the provisional government of the Republic of China (ROC) succeeded the Qing and received an imperial edict inheriting the claims over all of its territories. The newly formed ROC was unable to assert consistent authority in remote areas such as Tibet however. The 13th Dalai Lama declared that Tibet's relationship with China ended with the fall of the Qing dynasty and proclaimed independence, although almost no country formally recognized this. (Note: Except for the short-lived Outer Mongolia which signed a disputed treaty proclaiming mutual recognition of independence)

During the 1910s, the British and Russian empires, both vying for influence in Tibet, attempted to form an agreement with China regarding the region's status, but no consensus was reached. After the 13th Dalai Lama's death in 1933, the Kuomintang-ruled Nationalist government of ROC opened a mission in Lhasa to restart negotiations, but no agreements followed.

By 1949 the Nationalist government had lost its renewed civil war against the Chinese Communist Party. In 1951 Ü-Tsang and the western Kham area of Chamdo were annexed by the newly formed People's Republic of China.

== History ==
=== Fall of the Qing dynasty (1911) ===
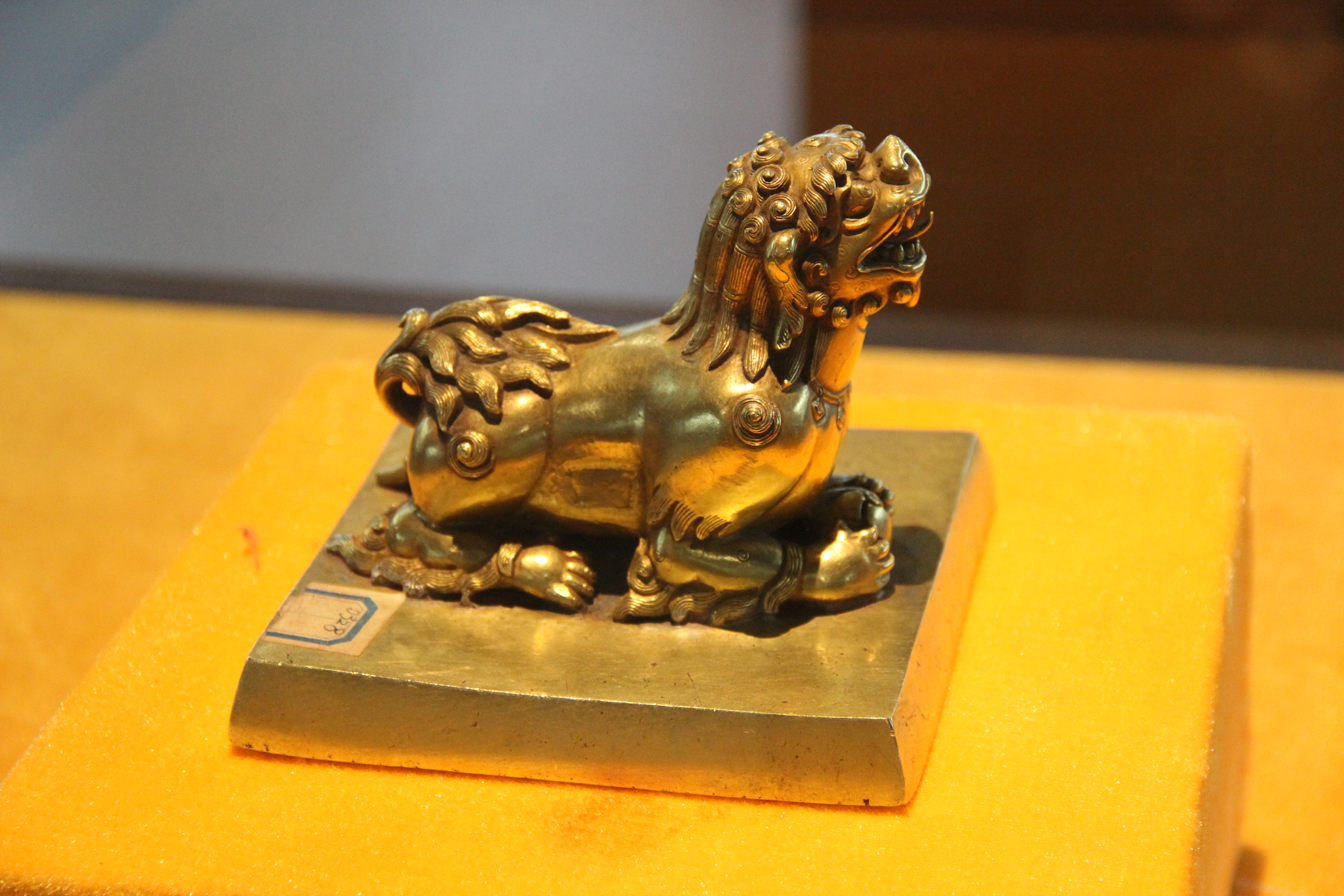
Gold Seal presented by the Tibetan people to the 13th Dalai Lama in 1909. Its use symbolized China no longer had nominal rule over Tibet

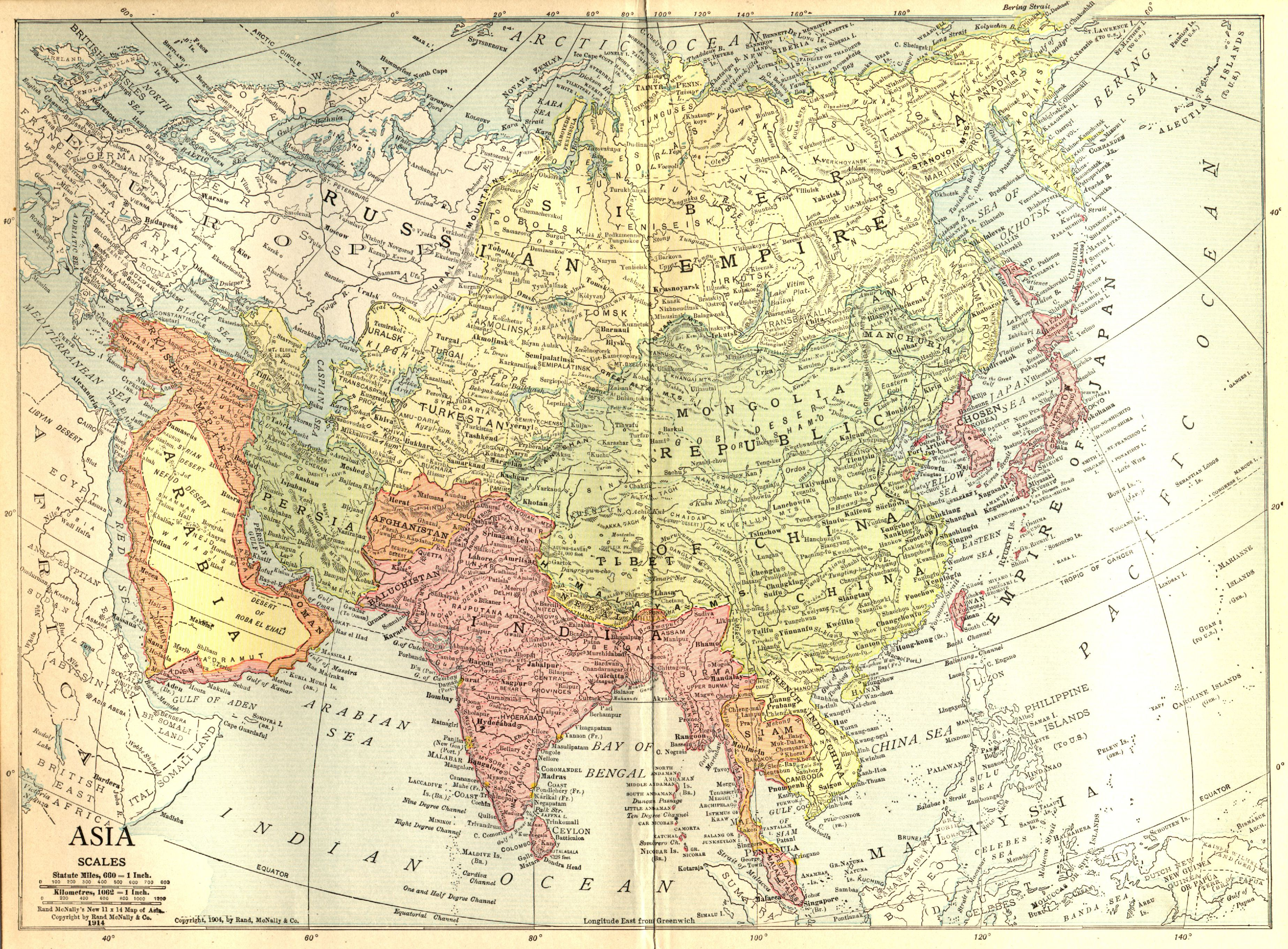
A map of East Asia in 1914 published by Rand McNally, showing Tibet as an autonomous region of the Republic of China (Note: As late as 1889, map from Rand McNally shows Tibet as outside China. See File:1889 China Map by Rand McNally and Company.jpg.)

Tibet came under the rule of the Qing dynasty of China in 1720 after the Qing expelled the forces of the Dzungar Khanate. But by the end of the 19th century, Qing authority in Tibet became little more than ritualistic and symbolic. In response to perceived British encroachment in Tibet, however, the Qing dynasty launched an expedition to the region in 1910 and decided to assert greater control over the region. Following the Xinhai Revolution in 1911–1912, Tibetan militia launched a surprise attack on the Qing garrison stationed in Tibet after the Xinhai Lhasa turmoil. After the fall of the Qing dynasty in 1912, the Qing officials in Lhasa were then forced to sign the "Three Point Agreement" for the surrender and expulsion of Qing forces in central Tibet. In early 1912, the Government of the Republic of China replaced the Qing dynasty as the government of China and the new republic asserted its sovereignty over all the territories of the previous dynasty, which included 22 Chinese provinces, Tibet, and Outer Mongolia. This claim was provided for in the Imperial Edict of the Abdication of the Qing Emperor signed by the Empress Dowager Longyu on behalf of the six-year-old Xuantong Emperor: "... the continued territorial integrity of the lands of the five races, Manchu, Han, Mongol, Hui, and Tibetan into one great Republic of China" (... 仍合滿、漢、蒙、回、藏五族完全領土，為一大中華民國). The Provisional Constitution of the Republic of China adopted in 1912 specifically established frontier regions of the new republic, including Tibet, as integral parts of the state.

Following the establishment of the new Republic, China's provisional President, Yuan Shikai, sent a telegram to the 13th Dalai Lama, restoring his earlier titles. The Dalai Lama spurned these titles, replying that he "intended to exercise both temporal and ecclesiastical rule in Tibet." In 1913 he returned to Lhasa and issued a proclamation that stated that the relationship between Beijing and Tibet "had been that of patron and priest and had not been based on the subordination of one to the other." "We are a small, religious, and independent nation," the proclamation stated.

In January 1913, Agvan Dorzhiev and three other Tibetan representatives signed a treaty between Tibet and Mongolia in Urga, proclaiming mutual recognition and their independence from China. The British diplomat Charles Bell wrote that the 13th Dalai Lama told him that he had not authorized Agvan Dorzhiev to conclude any treaties on behalf of Tibet. Because the text was not published, some initially doubted the existence of the treaty, but the Mongolian text was published by the Mongolian Academy of Sciences in 1982.

=== Simla Convention (1914) ===
In 1913–1914, a conference was held in Simla between the British India, Tibet, and the Republic of China. The British suggested dividing Tibetan-inhabited areas into an Outer and an Inner Tibet (on the model of an earlier agreement between China and Russia over Mongolia). Outer Tibet, approximately the same area as the modern Tibet Autonomous Region, would be autonomous under Chinese suzerainty. In this area, China would refrain from "interference in the administration." In Inner Tibet, consisting of eastern Kham and Amdo, China would have rights of administration and Lhasa would retain control of religious institutions.

When negotiations broke down over the specific boundary between Inner and Outer Tibet, the boundary of Tibet defined in the convention also included what came to be known as the McMahon Line, which delineated the Tibet-India border, in the Assam Himalayan region. The boundary included in India the Tawang tract, which had been under indirect administration of Tibet via the control of the Tawang monastery.

The Simla Convention was initialled by all three delegations, but was immediately rejected by Beijing because of dissatisfaction with the boundary between Outer and Inner Tibet. McMahon and the Tibetans then signed the document as a bilateral accord with a note denying China any of the rights under the convention until it signed. The British Government initially rejected McMahon's bilateral accord as being incompatible with the 1907 Anglo-Russian Convention.

The 1907 Anglo-Russian Treaty, which had earlier caused the British to question the validity of Simla, was renounced by the Russians in 1917 and by the Russians and British jointly in 1921. Tibet, however, altered its position on the McMahon Line in the 1940s. In late 1947, the Tibetan government wrote a note presented to the newly independent Indian Ministry of External Affairs laying claims to Tibetan districts south of the McMahon Line. According to Alastair Lamb, by refusing to sign the Simla documents, the Chinese Government had escaped giving any recognition to the McMahon Line.

=== After the death of the 13th Dalai Lama in 1933 ===
1936 Survey of India map of Tibet, showing Tibet as an independent country.

Since the expulsion of the Amban from Tibet in 1912, communication between Tibet and China had taken place only with the British as mediator. Direct communications resumed after the 13th Dalai Lama's death in December 1933, when China sent a "condolence mission" to Lhasa headed by General Huang Musong.

Soon after the 13th Dalai Lama died, according to some accounts, the Kashag reaffirmed its 1914 position that Tibet remained nominally part of China, provided Tibet could manage its own political affairs. In his essay Hidden Tibet: History of Independence and Occupation published by the Library of Tibetan Works and Archives at Dharamsala, S.L. Kuzmin cited several sources indicating that the Tibetan government had not declared Tibet a part of China, despite an intimation of Chinese sovereignty made by the Kuomintang government. Since 1912, Tibet had been de facto independent of Chinese control, but on other occasions it had indicated willingness to accept nominal subordinate status as a part of China, provided that Tibetan internal systems were left untouched, and provided China relinquished control over a number of important ethnic Tibetan areas in Kham and Amdo. In support of claims that China's rule over Tibet was not interrupted, China argues that official documents showed that the National Assembly of China and both chambers of parliament had Tibetan members, whose names had been preserved all along.

China was then permitted to establish an office in Lhasa, staffed by the Mongolian and Tibetan Affairs Commission and headed by Wu Zhongxin, the commission's director of Tibetan Affairs, which Chinese sources claim was an administrative body—but the Tibetans claim that they rejected China's proposal that Tibet should be a part of China, and in turn demanded the return of territories east of the Drichu (Yangtze River). In response to the establishment of a Chinese office in Lhasa, the British obtained similar permission and set up their own office there.

The 1934 Khamba Rebellion led by Pandastang Togbye and Pandatsang Rapga broke out against the Tibetan Government during this time, with the Pandatsang family leading Khamba tribesmen against the Tibetan Army.

=== 1930s to 1949 ===
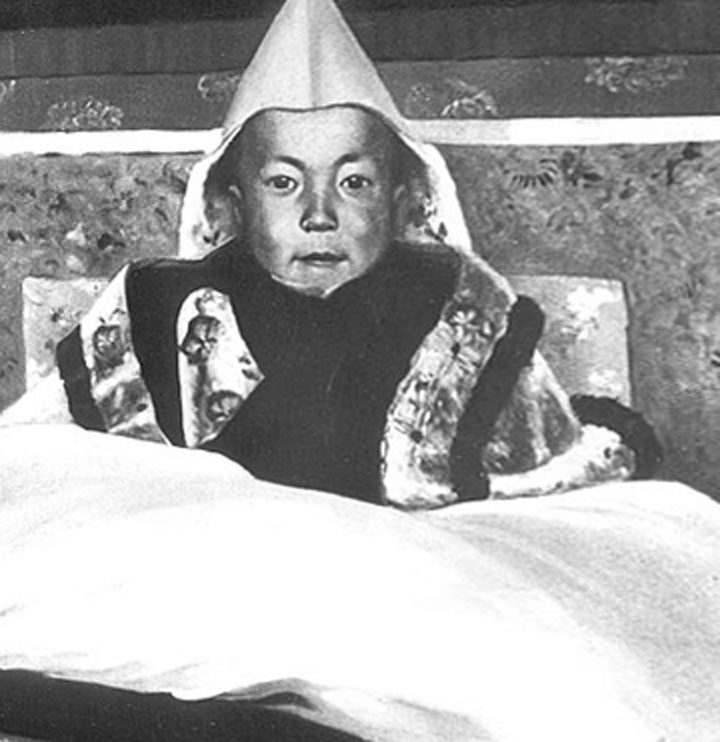
The 14th Dalai Lama as a young boy.

In 1935, Lhamo Dhondup was born in Amdo in eastern Tibet and recognized by all concerned as the incarnation of the 13th Dalai Lama. Similar to his predecessor Thubten Gyatso who was approved by the Central Government of China in 1877 to be exempted from the lot-drawing process using Golden Urn to become the 13th Dalai Lama On 26 January 1940, the Regent Reting Rinpoche requested the Central Government of China to exempt Lhamo Dhondup from the lot-drawing process using the Golden Urn to become the 14th Dalai Lama, and the Chinese government approved. After a ransom of 400,000 silver dragons had been paid by Lhasa to the Hui Muslim warlord Ma Bufang, who ruled Qinghai (Chinghai) from Xining, Ma Bufang released him to travel to Lhasa in 1939. He was then enthroned by the Ganden Phodrang government at the Potala Palace on the Tibetan New Year.

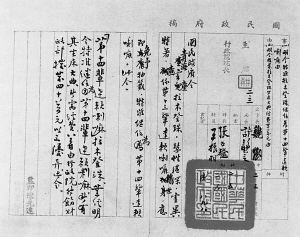
The approval certificate of the accession of the 14th Dalai Lama issued by the Government of the Republic of China on 1 January 1940

The Kuomintang Government 'ratified' the current 14th Dalai Lama, and that Kuomintang representative General Wu Zhongxin presided over the ceremony; both the ratification order of February 1940 and the documentary film of the ceremony still exist intact. Wu Zhongxin (along with other foreign representatives) was present at the ceremony. Reports from contemporary newspapers, sourced directly from Lhasa, also give witness to these ceremonies. For example, the Associated Press on 22 February 1940 writes:

Lhasa, Tibet (Thursday) - (By Radio to Hong Kong) - [..] The Chinese government had worked for months to put the succession of Ling-ergh La-mu-tan-chu beyond the fortunes of the goldern urn from which the 14th Dalai Lama would normally be picked. Yet today, with true Oriental urbanity, the Regent of Tibet petitioned the Chungking government to authorized the abandonment of the traditional lot-drawing. This given, he wirelessed warm thanks to Chiang Kai-shek and other Chinese governmental leaders.

Regarding the ceremony, according to Associated Press reports dated 23 February 1940:

Direct word from Lhasa arrived only today, telling of the lengthy rites in which Chinese officials took part. Chinese learned with satisfaction that Gen. Wu Chung Hsin, chairman of the Mongolian and Tibetan affairs commission at Chungking and chief of the Chinese delegation at the enthronement, sat at the Dalai Lama's left -- thus being accorded an equal status with the new ruler. Lhasa enjoyed a complete holiday. The populace was treated to devil dances, horse shows, wrestling contests and a fireworks display.

Likewise, according to United Press reports dated 22 February 1940:

Lhasa, Tibet. Feb 22 - The fourteenth Dalai Lama, who will share spiritual and temporal leadership of Tibet, was enthroned in a pompous elaborate ceremony today. The enthronement took place in Lhasa's leading monastery, "Potala". The six-year-old boy chosen after long search for the exalted position, received felicitations from a Chinese delegation numbering 1,000 persons. A departure from ordinary procedure was marked by display of a huge portrait of Dr. Sun Yat-sen and a Kuomintang flag in the golden main hall of the monastery.

Billings Gazette Sun reports dated 18 February 1940:

Tibetan circles here revealed that the portrait of Dr. Sun Yat-sen, "father of the Chinese republic", will have the place of honor in the main ceremonial hall, surrounded by Buddhist pictures. [..] All these, Tibetan sources pointed out, mark "the cordial friendship and political ties between Tibet and the central government." [..] There are two other children who theoretically have an equal chance of being chosen. [..] However Tibetan and Chinese officials favor the Kokonor boy.

Britain, who had an interest in Tibet at the time and wished to undermine Chinese sovereignty over it, had a representative, Sir Basil Gould, who claims to have been present at the ceremony, and opposes the above diverse international sources that China presided over it. He claims that:

The report was issued in the Chinese Press that Mr Wu had escorted the Dalai Lama to his throne and announced his installation, that the Dalai Lama had returned thanks, and prostrated himself in token of his gratitude. Every one of these Chinese claims was false. Mr Wu was merely a passive spectator. He did no more than present a ceremonial scarf, as was done by the others, including the British Representative. But the Chinese have the ear of the world, and can later refer to their press records and present an account of historical events that is wholly untrue. Tibet has no newspapers, either in English or Tibetan, and has therefore no means of exposing these falsehoods.

Tibetan author Nyima Gyaincain wrote that based on Tibetan tradition, there was no such thing as presiding over an event, and claims that the Han Chinese word "主持" (to preside or organize) was used in many places in communication documents. The meaning of the word was different than what we understand today. He added that Wu Zhongxin spent a lot of time and energy on the event, his effect of presiding over or organizing the event was very obvious.

In 1942, the U.S. government told the government of Chiang Kai-shek that it had never disputed Chinese claims to Tibet. In 1944, the USA War Department produced a series of seven documentary films on Why We Fight; in the sixth series, The Battle of China, Tibet is incorrectly called a province of China (as the Chinese officially referred to the administrative division of Tibet as Tibet Area, which was distinct from a province). In 1944, during World War II, two Austrian mountaineers, Heinrich Harrer and Peter Aufschnaiter, came to Lhasa, where Harrer became a tutor and friend to the young Dalai Lama, giving him sound knowledge of Western culture and modern society, until Harrer chose to leave in 1949.

Tibet established a Foreign Office in 1942, and in 1946 it sent congratulatory missions to China and India (related to the end of World War II). The mission to China was given a letter addressed to Chinese President Chiang Kai-shek which states that, "We shall continue to maintain the independence of Tibet as a nation ruled by the successive Dalai Lamas through an authentic religious-political rule." The mission agreed to attend a Chinese constitutional assembly in Nanjing as observers.

Under orders from the Kuomintang government of Chiang Kai-shek, Ma Bufang repaired the Yushu airport in 1942 to deter Tibetan independence. Chiang also ordered Ma Bufang to put his Muslim soldiers on alert for an invasion of Tibet in 1942. Ma Bufang complied, and moved several thousand troops to the border with Tibet. Chiang also threatened the Tibetans with bombing if they did not comply.

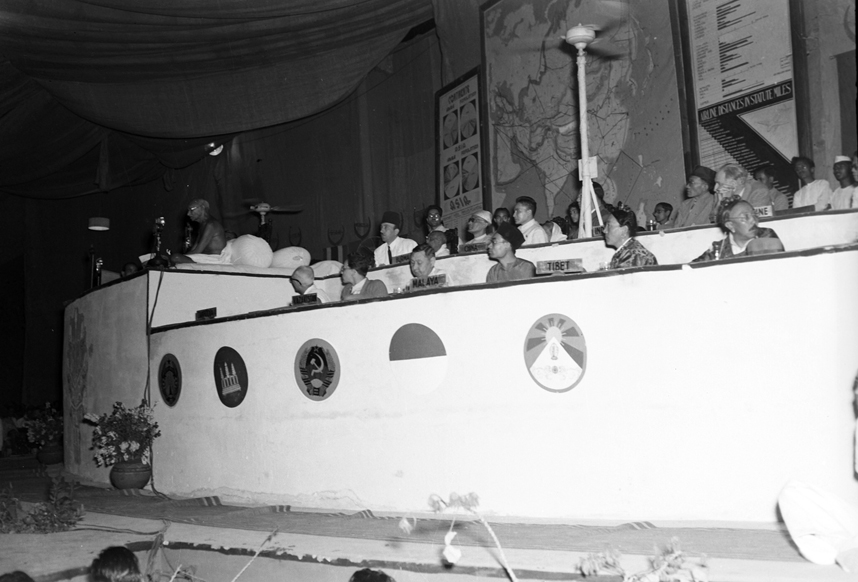
Emblem of Tibet shown at the 1947 Asian Relations Conference, Delhi

In 1947, Tibet sent a delegation to the Asian Relations Conference in New Delhi, India, where it represented itself as an independent nation. India based its position on recognising it as an independent nation until 1954. This may have been the first appearance of the Tibetan national flag at a public gathering.

André Migot, a French doctor who travelled for many months in Tibet in 1947, described the complex history and border arrangements between Tibet and China. Following the 1906 British expedition to Tibet, the Qing government attempted to reinforce its control over the region but was met with resistance. Chinese bannerman Zhao Erfeng killed many Tibetans in Kham and attempted to create a new province called Xikang. After the 1911 Revolution however, Chinese forces lost ground control beyond the city of Kangding.

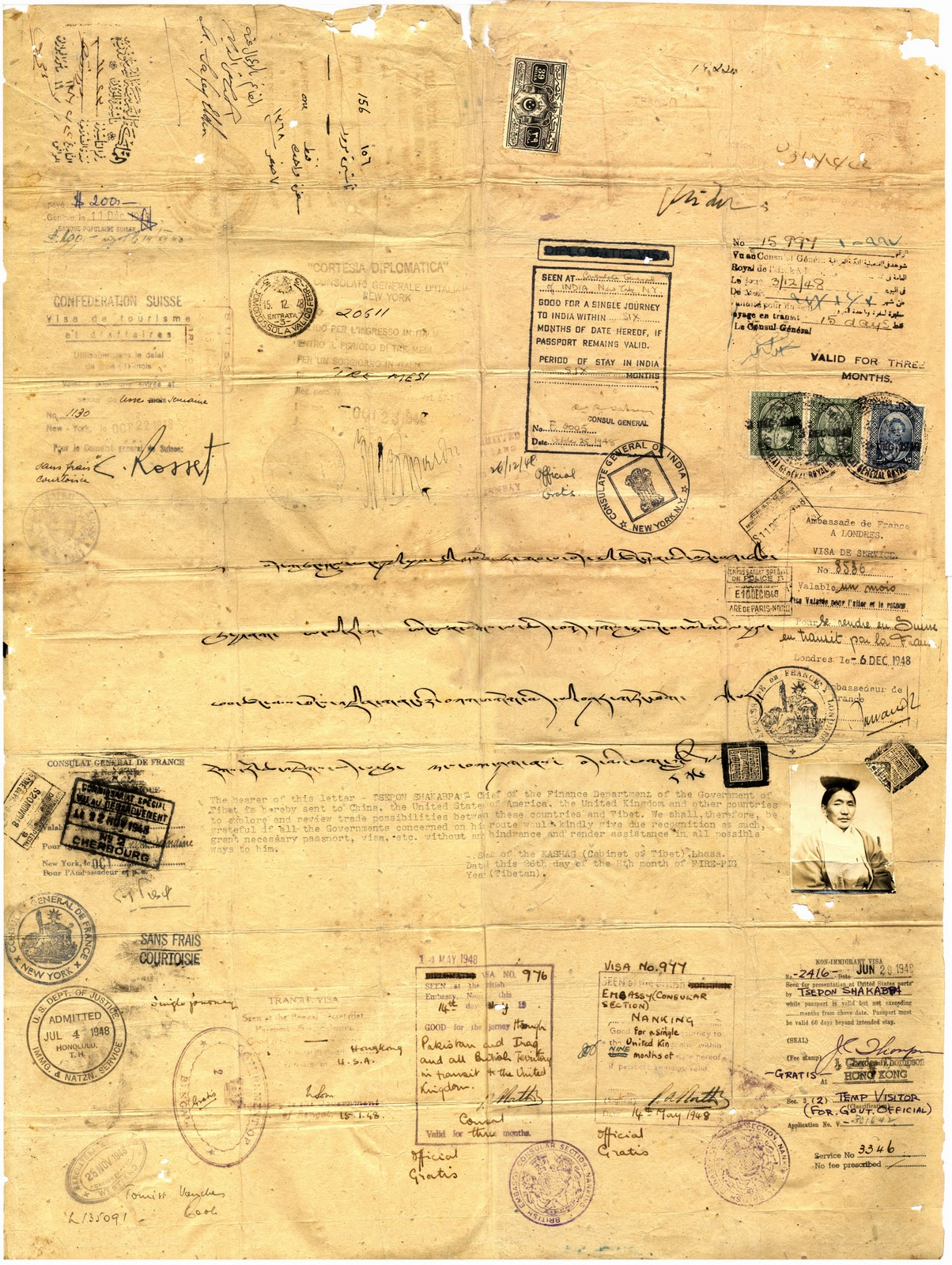
Tibetan passport for Shakabpa, with visas from various countries.

In 1947–49, Lhasa sent a trade mission led by Finance Minister Tsepon W. D. Shakabpa to India, China, Hong Kong, the US, and the UK. The visited countries were careful not to express support for the claim that Tibet was independent of China and did not discuss political questions with the mission. These Trade Mission officials entered China via Hong Kong with their newly issued Tibetan passports that they applied at the Chinese Consulate in India and stayed in China for three months. Other countries did, however, allow the mission to travel using passports issued by the Tibetan government. The U.S. unofficially received the Trade Mission. The mission met with British Prime Minister Clement Attlee in London in 1948.

=== Annexation by the People's Republic of China ===
In the year 1949, seeing that the Communists were gaining control of China, the Kashag government expelled all Chinese officials from Tibet despite protests from both the Kuomintang and the Communists. On 1 October 1949, the 10th Panchen Lama wrote a telegraph to Beijing, expressing his congratulations for the liberation of northwest China and the establishment of the People's Republic of China, and his excitement to see the inevitable liberation of Tibet. The Chinese Communist government, led by Chairman Mao Zedong, began reasserting Chinese presence shortly thereafter. In June 1950, the British government stated in the House of Commons that His Majesty's Government "have always been prepared to recognise Chinese suzerainty over Tibet, but only on the understanding that Tibet is regarded as autonomous". In October 1950, the People's Liberation Army entered the Tibetan area of Chamdo, defeating sporadic resistance from the Tibetan Army. In 1951, representatives of the Tibetan authorities, headed by Ngapoi Ngawang Jigme, with the Dalai Lama's authorization, participated in negotiations in Beijing with the Chinese government. It resulted in the Seventeen Point Agreement which affirmed China's sovereignty over Tibet. The agreement was ratified in Lhasa a few months later. China described the signing of the agreement as the "peaceful liberation of Tibet".

== Politics ==
=== Government ===
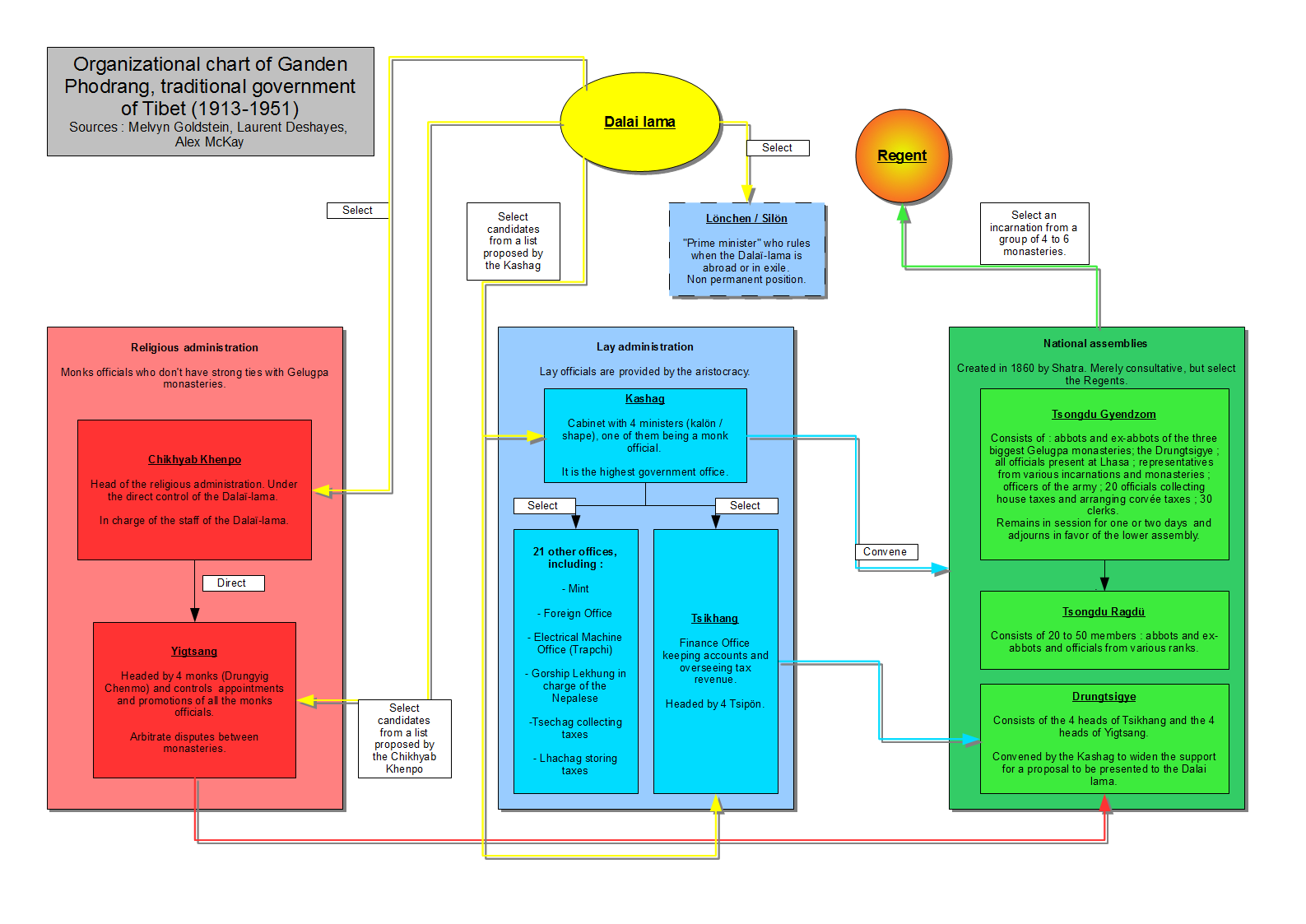
Organizational chart of Ganden Phodrang

=== Administrative divisions ===
Tibet was divided into eight chikyaps (Wylie: spyi khyab), which were subdivided into dzongs (Wylie: rdzong) and shikas (Wylie: gzhis ka):

- Lhasa Chikyap also known as Xoi Chikyap or Xoi Lhakhang, administered 29 dzongs. seat: Lhasa.
- Changgyu Chikyap, seat: Nagqu.
- Lhoka Chikyap, seat: Tsetang.
- Dakong Chikyap, seat: rtse-la.
- Ngari Chikyap also known as Ngari Garpön, seat: Gar.
- Chomo Chikyap, seat: Chomo.
- Shigatse Chikyap, seat: Shigatse.
- Domed Chikyap, also known as Kham Chikyap, seat: Chamdo.

=== Military ===
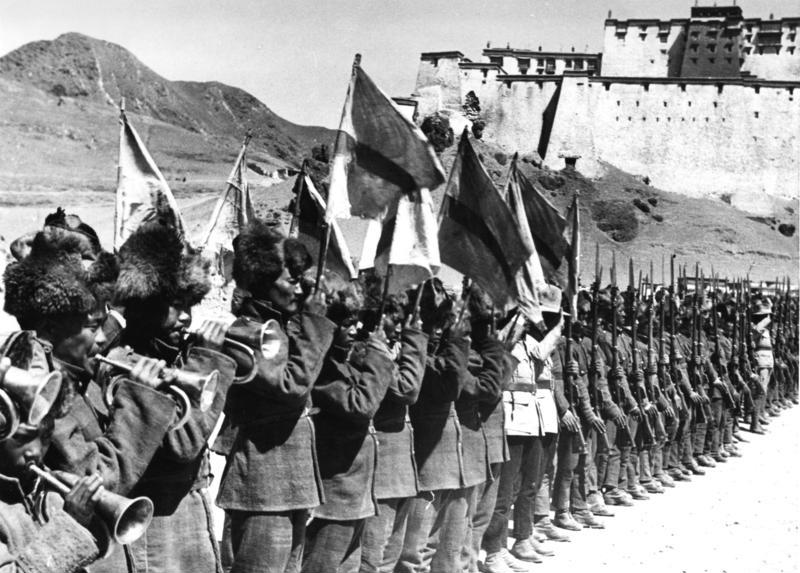
The Tibetan Army on parade in 1938

After the 13th Dalai Lama had assumed full control over Tibet in the 1910s, he began to build up the Tibetan Army with support from the United Kingdom, which provided advisors and weapons. This army was supposed to be large and modern enough to not just defend Tibet, but to also conquer surrounding regions like Kham which were inhabited by Tibetan peoples. The Tibetan Army was constantly expanded during the 13th Dalai Lama's reign, and had about 10,000 soldiers by 1936. These were adequately armed and trained infantrymen for the time, though the army almost completely lacked machine guns, artillery, planes, and tanks. In addition to the regular army, Tibet also made use of great numbers of poorly armed village militias. Considering that it was usually outgunned by their opponents, the Tibetan Army performed relatively well against various Chinese warlords in the 1920s and 1930s. Overall, the Tibetan soldiers proved to be "fearless and tough fighters" during the Warlord Era.

Despite this, the Tibetan Army was wholly inadequate to resist the People's Liberation Army (PLA) during the Chinese invasion of 1950. It consequently disintegrated and surrendered without much resistance.

=== Postal service ===
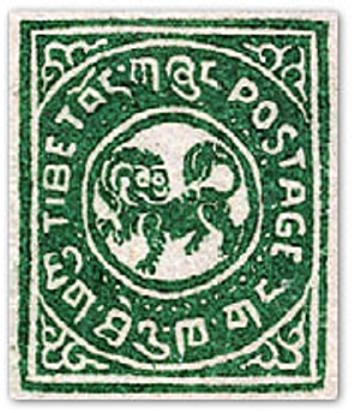
Snow lion stamp issued in 1912

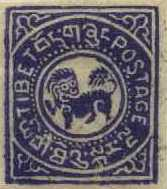
Snow lion stamp issued in 1912

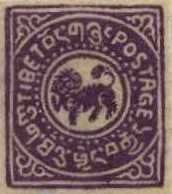
Snow lion stamp issued in 1912

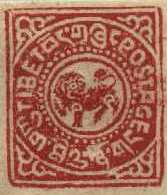
Snow lion stamp issued in 1912

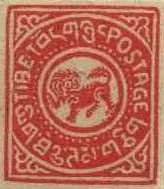
Snow lion stamp issued in 1912

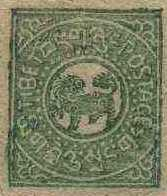
Snow lion stamp issued in 1912

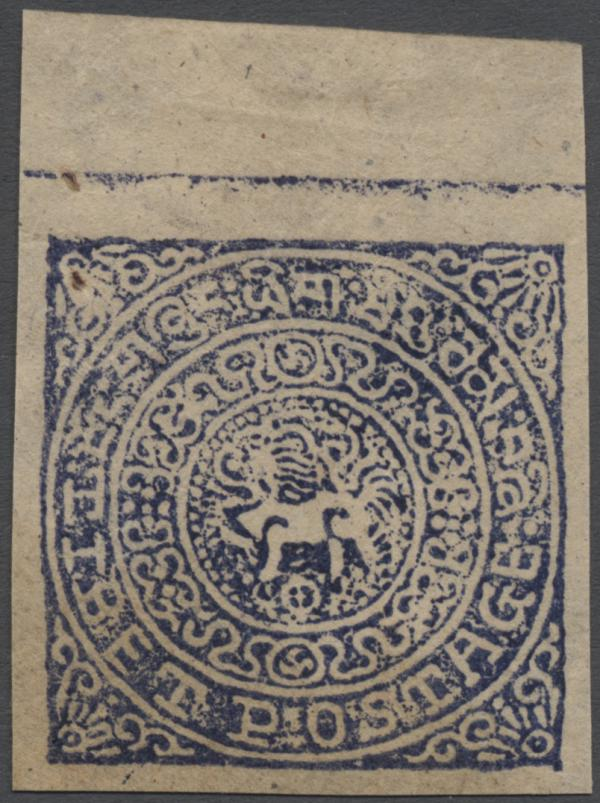
Snow lion stamp issued in 1920

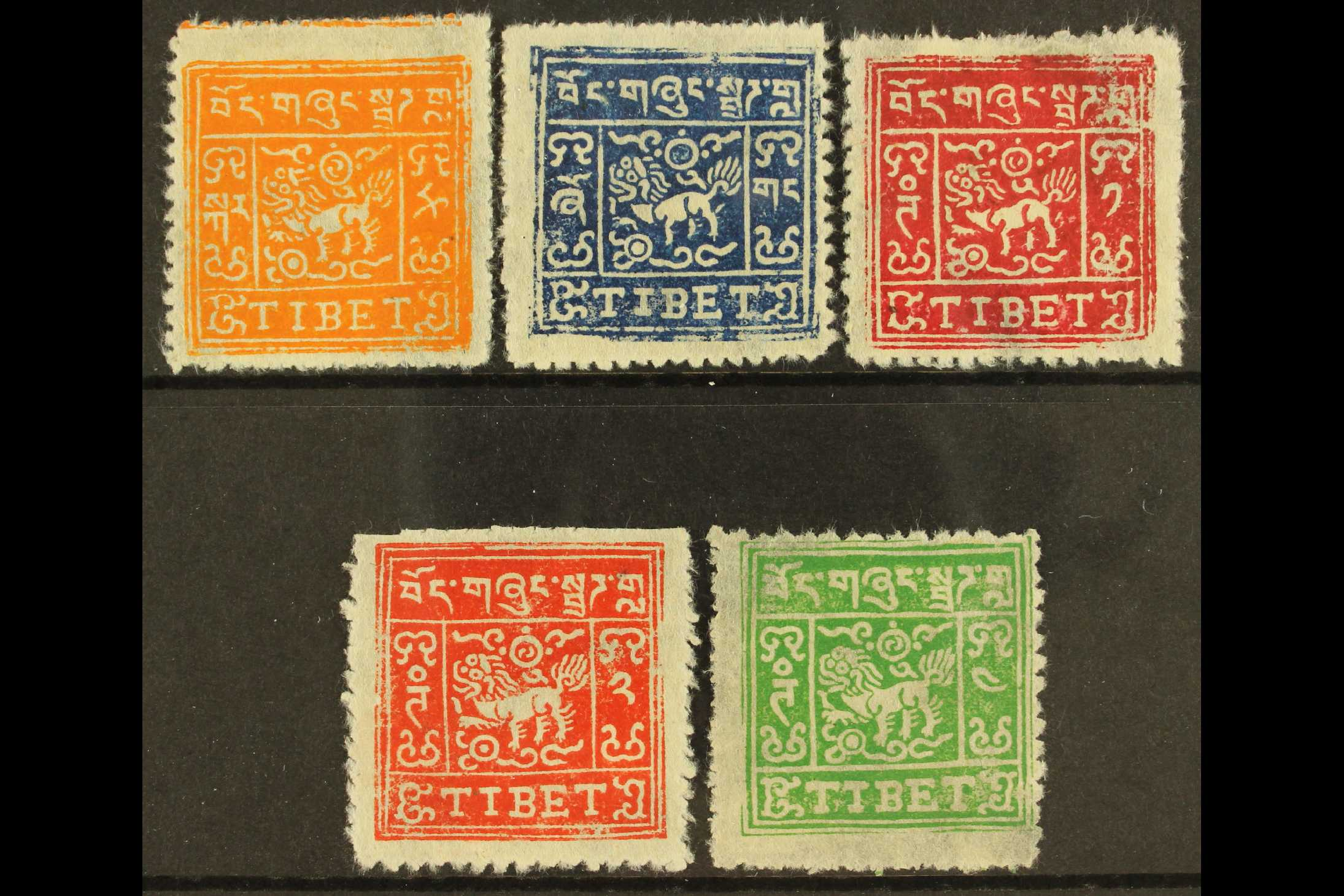
Snow lion stamps issued in 1933

Tibet created its own postal service in 1912. It printed its first postage stamps in Lhasa and issued them in 1912. The stamps were marked in Tibetan characters meaning "Tibet Government" and by "Tibet" in English. It issued telegraph stamps in 1950.

=== Foreign relations ===
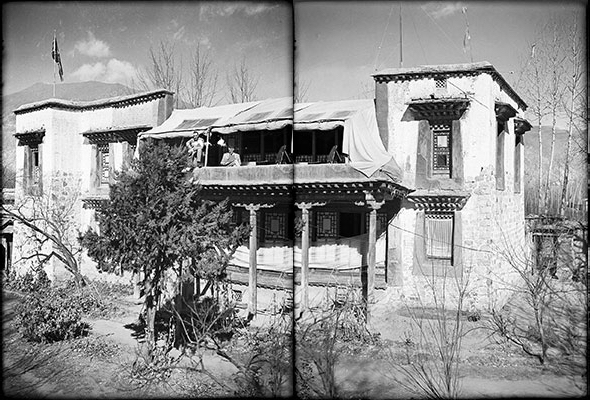
Residence of the British Mission in Lhasa

The division of China into military cliques kept China divided, and the 13th Dalai Lama ruled. But his reign was marked with border conflicts with Han Chinese and Muslim warlords, which the Tibetans lost most of the time. At that time, the government of Tibet controlled all of Ü-Tsang (Dbus-gtsang) and western Kham (Khams), roughly coincident with the borders of the Tibet Autonomous Region today. Eastern Kham, separated by the Yangtze River, was under the control of Chinese warlord Liu Wenhui. The situation in Amdo (Qinghai) was more complicated, with the Xining area controlled after 1928 by the Hui warlord Ma Bufang of the family of Muslim warlords known as the Ma clique, who constantly strove to exert control over the rest of Amdo (Qinghai). Southern Kham, along with other parts of Yunnan, belonged to the Yunnan clique from 1915 till 1927, then to Governor and warlord Long (Lung) Yun until near the end of the Chinese Civil War, when Du Yuming removed him under the order of Chiang Kai-shek. Within territory under Chinese control, war was being waged against Tibetan rebels in Qinghai during the Kuomintang Pacification of Qinghai.

In 1918, Lhasa regained control of Chamdo and western Kham. A truce set the border at the Yangtze River. At this time, the government of Tibet controlled all of Ü-Tsang and Kham west of the Yangtze River, roughly the same borders as the Tibet Autonomous Region has today. Eastern Kham was governed by local Tibetan princes of varying allegiances. Qinghai was controlled by ethnic Hui and pro-Kuomintang warlord Ma Bufang. In 1932, Tibet invaded Qinghai, attempting to capture southern parts of Qinghai province, following contention in Yushu, Qinghai, over a monastery in 1932. Ma Bufang's Qinghai army defeated the Tibetan armies.

During the 1920s and 1930s, China was divided by civil war and occupied with the anti-Japanese war, but never renounced its claim to sovereignty over Tibet, and made occasional attempts to assert it.

In 1932, the Muslim Qinghai and Han-Chinese Sichuan armies of the National Revolutionary Army led by Ma Bufang and Liu Wenhui defeated the Tibetan Army in the Sino-Tibetan War when the 13th Dalai Lama tried to seize territory in Qinghai and Xikang. They warned the Tibetans not to dare cross the Jinsha river again. A truce was signed, ending the fighting. The Dalai Lama had cabled the British in India for help when his armies were defeated, and started demoting his Generals who had surrendered.

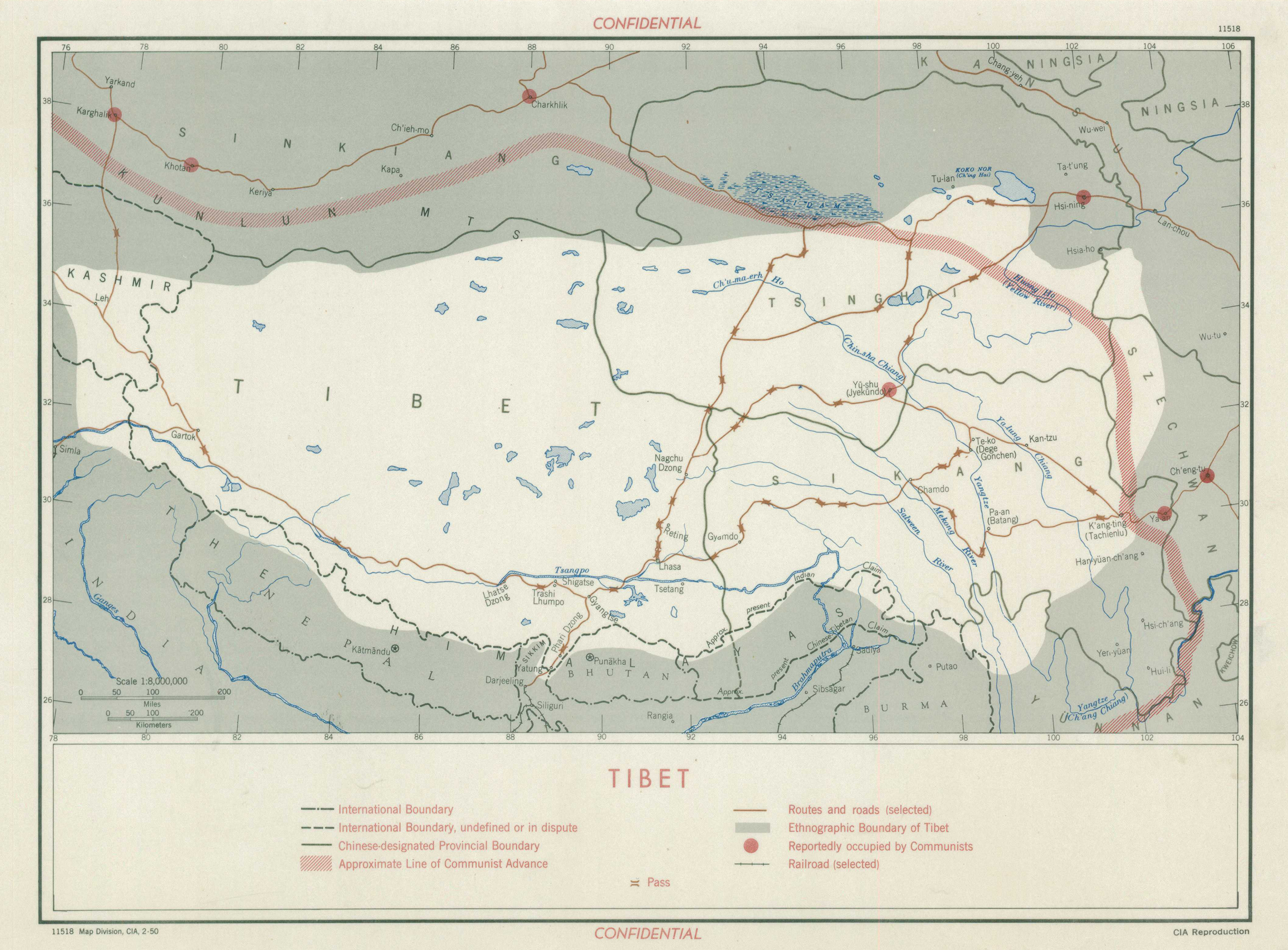
Territorial extent of Tibet and approximate line of communist advance in February 1950

In 1936, after Sheng Shicai expelled 30,000 Kazakhs from Xinjiang to Qinghai, Hui led by General Ma Bufang massacred their fellow Muslim Kazakhs, until there were 135 of them left. From Northern Xinjiang, over 7,000 Kazakhs fled to the Tibetan-Qinghai plateau region via Gansu and were wreaking massive havoc so Ma Bufang solved the problem by relegating the Kazakhs into designated pastureland in Qinghai, but Hui, Tibetans, and Kazakhs in the region continued to clash against each other. Tibetans attacked and fought against the Kazakhs as they entered Tibet via Gansu and Qinghai. In northern Tibet, Kazakhs clashed with Tibetan soldiers and then the Kazakhs were sent to Ladakh. Tibetan troops robbed and killed Kazakhs 400 miles east of Lhasa at Chamdo when the Kazakhs were entering Tibet.

In 1934, 1935, 1936–1938 from Qumil Eliqsan led the Kerey Kazakhs to migrate to Gansu and the amount was estimated at 18,000, and they entered Gansu and Qinghai.

In 1951, the Uyghur Yulbars Khan was attacked by Tibetan troops as he fled Xinjiang to reach Calcutta.

The anti-communist American CIA agent Douglas Mackiernan was killed by Tibetan troops on 29 April 1950.

== Economy ==
=== Currency ===
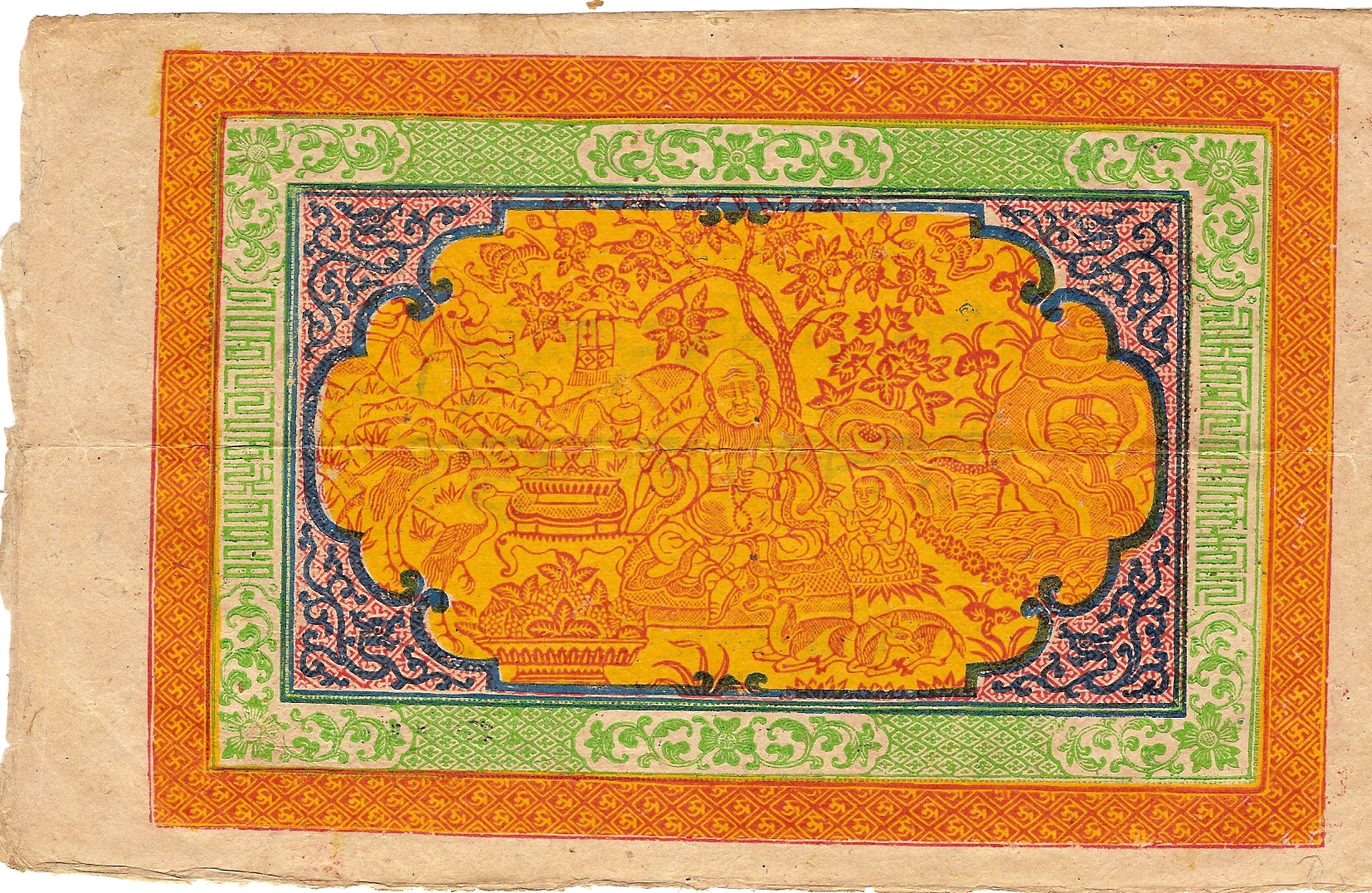
Tibetan 100 tam Srang (back)

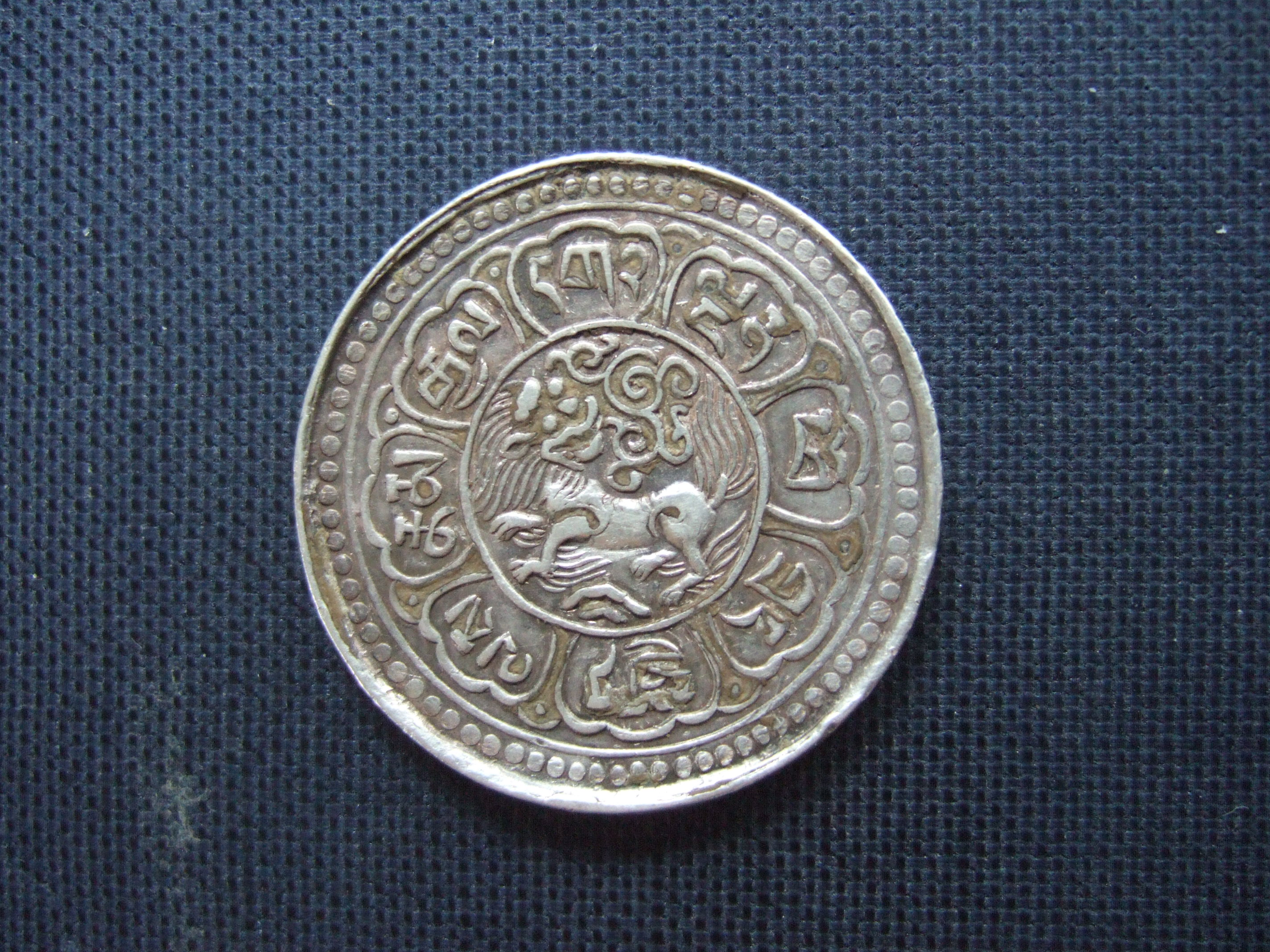
Tibetan 1 Srang silver coin, issued 1919

The Tibetan government issued banknotes and coins.

== Society and culture ==
Traditional Tibetan society consisted of a feudal class structure, which was one of the reasons the Chinese Communist Party claims that it had to "liberate" Tibet and reform its government.

Professor of Buddhist and Tibetan studies, Donald S. Lopez, stated that at the time:

Traditional Tibet, like any complex society, had great inequalities, with power monopolized by an elite composed of a small aristocracy, the hierarchs of various sects . . and the great Geluk monasteries.

These institutional groups retained great power until 1959.

The 13th Dalai Lama had reformed the pre-existing serf system in the first decade of the 20th century, and by 1950, slavery itself had probably ceased to exist in central Tibet, though perhaps persisted in certain border areas. Slavery did exist, for example, in places like the Chumbi Valley, and beggars (ragyabas) were endemic. The pre-Chinese social system, however, was rather complex.

Estates (shiga), roughly similar to the English manorial system, were granted by the state and were hereditary, though revocable. As agricultural properties, they consisted of two kinds: land held by the nobility or monastic institutions (demesne land), and village land (tenement or villein land) held by the central government, though governed by district administrators. Demesne land consisted, on average, of one-half to three-quarters of an estate. Villein land belonged to the estates, but tenants normally exercised hereditary usufruct rights in exchange for fulfilling their corvée obligations. Tibetans outside the nobility and the monastic system were classified as serfs, but two types existed and functionally were comparable to tenant farmers. Agricultural serfs, or "small smoke" (düchung), were bound to work on estates as a corvée obligation (ula) but they had title to their own plots, owned private goods, were free to move about outside the periods required for their tribute labor, and were free of tax obligations. They could accrue wealth and on occasion became lenders to the estates themselves, and could sue the estate owners: village serfs (tralpa) were bound to their villages but only for tax and corvée purposes, such as road transport duties (ula), and were only obliged to pay taxes. Half of the village serfs were man-lease serfs (mi-bog), meaning that they had purchased their freedom. Estate owners exercised broad rights over attached serfs, and flight or a monastic life was the only venue of relief. Yet no mechanism existed to restore escaped serfs to their estates, and no means to enforce bondage existed, though the estate lord held the right to pursue and forcibly return them to the land.

Any serf who had absented himself from his estate for three years was automatically granted either commoner (chi mi) status or reclassified as a serf of the central government. Estate lords could transfer their subjects to other lords or rich peasants for labor, though this practice was uncommon in Tibet. Though rigid structurally, the system exhibited considerable flexibility at ground level, with peasants free of constraints from the lord of the manor once they had fulfilled their corvée obligations. Historically, discontent or abuse of the system, according to Warren W. Smith, appears to have been rare. Tibet was far from a meritocracy, but the Dalai Lamas were recruited from the sons of peasant families, and the sons of nomads could rise to master the monastic system and become scholars and abbots.

== See also ==
- Arunachal Pradesh
- South Tibet
- Captive Nations
- Flag of Tibet
- Four Rugby Boys
- Ganden Phodrang
- Historical money of Tibet
- History of Tibet (1950–present)
- Kashag
- Mongolian and Tibetan Affairs Commission
- Tibet Area (administrative division)
- Tibet under Qing rule
