= Reting Rinpoche =

Tibetan Buddhist title

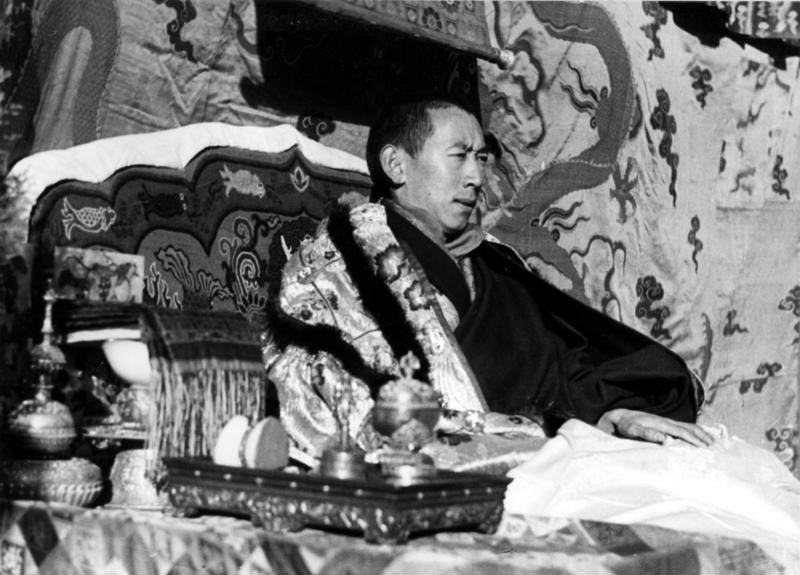
Jamphel Yeshe Gyaltsen, 1938

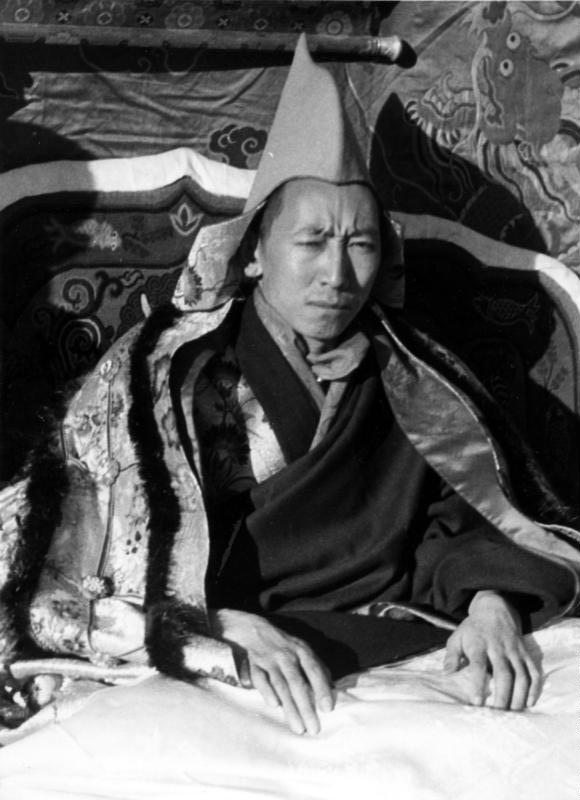
Jamphel Yeshe Gyaltsen, 1938

Reting Rinpoche (Tibetan: རྭ་སྒྲེང་རིན་པོ་ཆེ, Wylie: rwa-sgreng rin-po-che, ZWPY: Razheng) is a title held by abbots of Reting Monastery, a Buddhist monastery in central Tibet.

== History of the lineage ==
Historically, the Reting Rinpoche has occasionally acted as the selector of the new Dalai Lama incarnation. It is for this reason that most observers believe the Chinese government has tried to install a sympathetic figure in the position.

== List of Reting Rinpoches ==
1. Ngawang Chokden (1677–1751)
2. Lobsang Yeshe Tenpa Rabgye (1759–1815)
3. Ngawang Yeshe Tsultrim Gyaltsen (1816–1863)
4. Ngawang Lobsang Yeshe Tenpai Gyaltsen (1867-1910)
5. Jamphel Yeshe Gyaltsen (1912–1947)
6. Tenzin Jigme Thutob Wangchuk (1948–1997)
7. Lodrö Gyatso Trinley Lhündrup (2000–present)

== Regency of the Fifth Reting Rinpoche ==
The fifth Reting Rinpoche, Thubten Jamphel Yeshe Gyaltsen (1911–1947; Tibetan: ཐུབ་བསྟན་འཇམ་དཔལ་ཡེ་ཤེས་རྒྱལ་མཚན་, Wylie: thub-bstan 'jam-dpal ye-shes rgyal-mtshan), played a significant role in Tibetan history as the one-time regent (desi) of the present Dalai Lama. He was replaced in 1941 and subsequently is alleged to have organized an uprising against his replacement. He died in 1947 in the prisons of Lhasa's Potala, apparently the victim of poisoning. A jailor also allegedly reported that his testicles were bound and beaten until he died of the pain. Melvyn C. Goldstein report words from Tsepon W. D. Shakabpa who said many people said so, but an investigation was carried out by the Tibetan Assembly to check Reting's body. Shakabpa was member of the committee that also included Tsarong, Khenchen Lobsang Tashi, Gyetakba, as well as representatives from Reting and Sera Monasteries. Tsarong declared to the Assembly there was no evidence that Reting was strangled, there was no wound or anything.

The episode exposed a number of the political dimensions of the religious hierarchy in Lhasa. Critics of the fifth Reting Rinpoche accused him of widespread corruption, and involvement with married women as a monk. Defenders alleged that his imprisonment was partly the result of his attraction to the teachings of the Nyingma lineage, a politically sensitive orientation, and that the case against him had been fabricated by the cabinet minister Kapshopa.

His time as regent, imprisonment and death feature significantly in Martin Scorsese's 1997 film Kundun.

== Sixth and seventh Reting Rinpoche ==
=== Reincarnation ===
Tenzin Jigme Thutob Wangchuk was born in Lhasa in 1948. He was identified as the reincarnation of the fifth Reting Rinpoche in 1951 and enthroned in 1955. He was recognized by the Tibetan government. He stayed in Tibet when the Tibetan government went in exile in 1959 during the Tibetan diaspora.

He died in 1997 and was succeeded by a reincarnation that was appointed by the Chinese government and not considered legitimate by the unrecognized Tibetan Government in Exile.

== See also ==
- Gelug lineage
- Dalai Lama
- Reting Monastery
