= Historical money of Tibet =

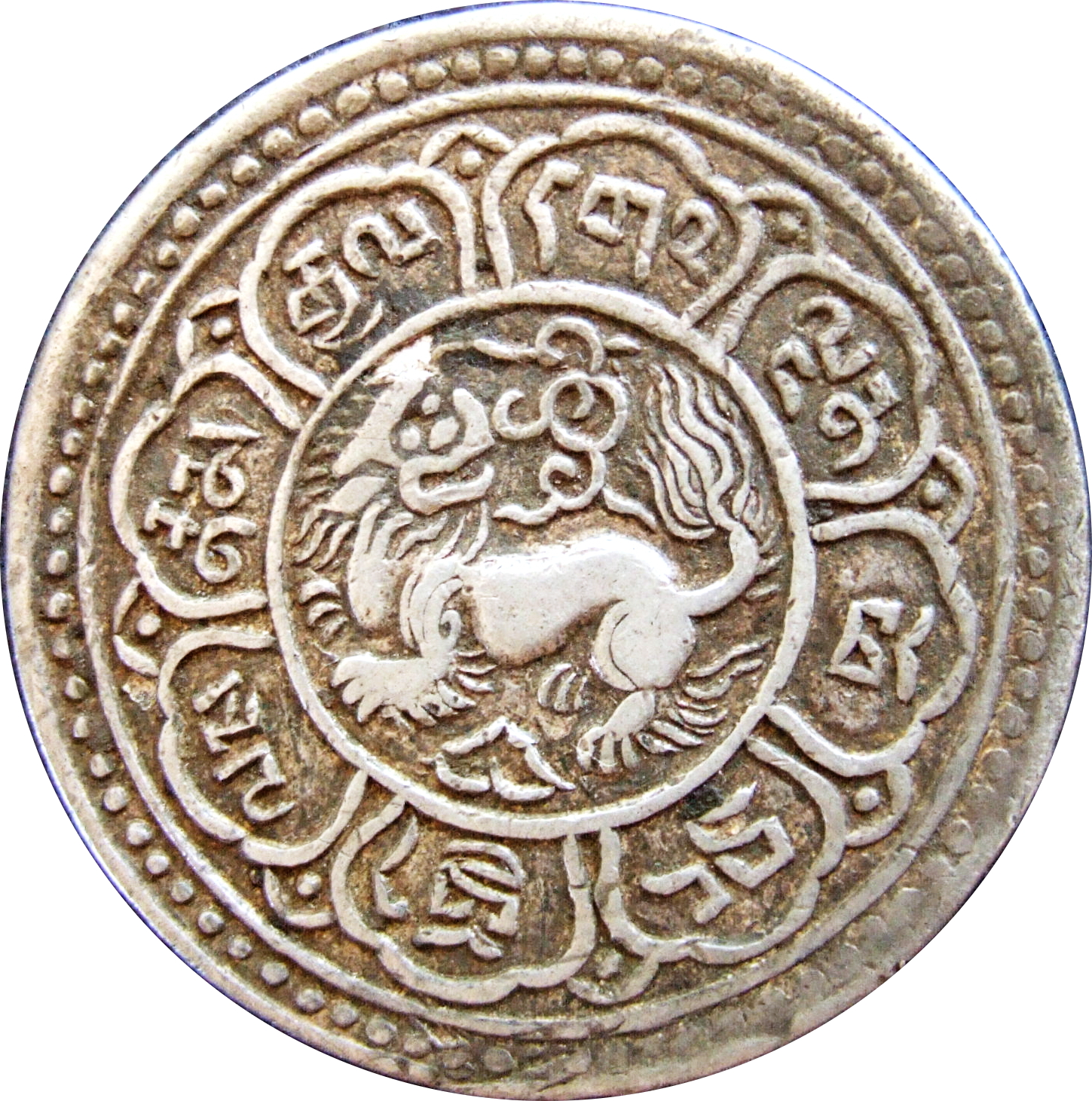
Tibetan 1 srang silver coin, dated 15–43 (= AD 1909) obverse.

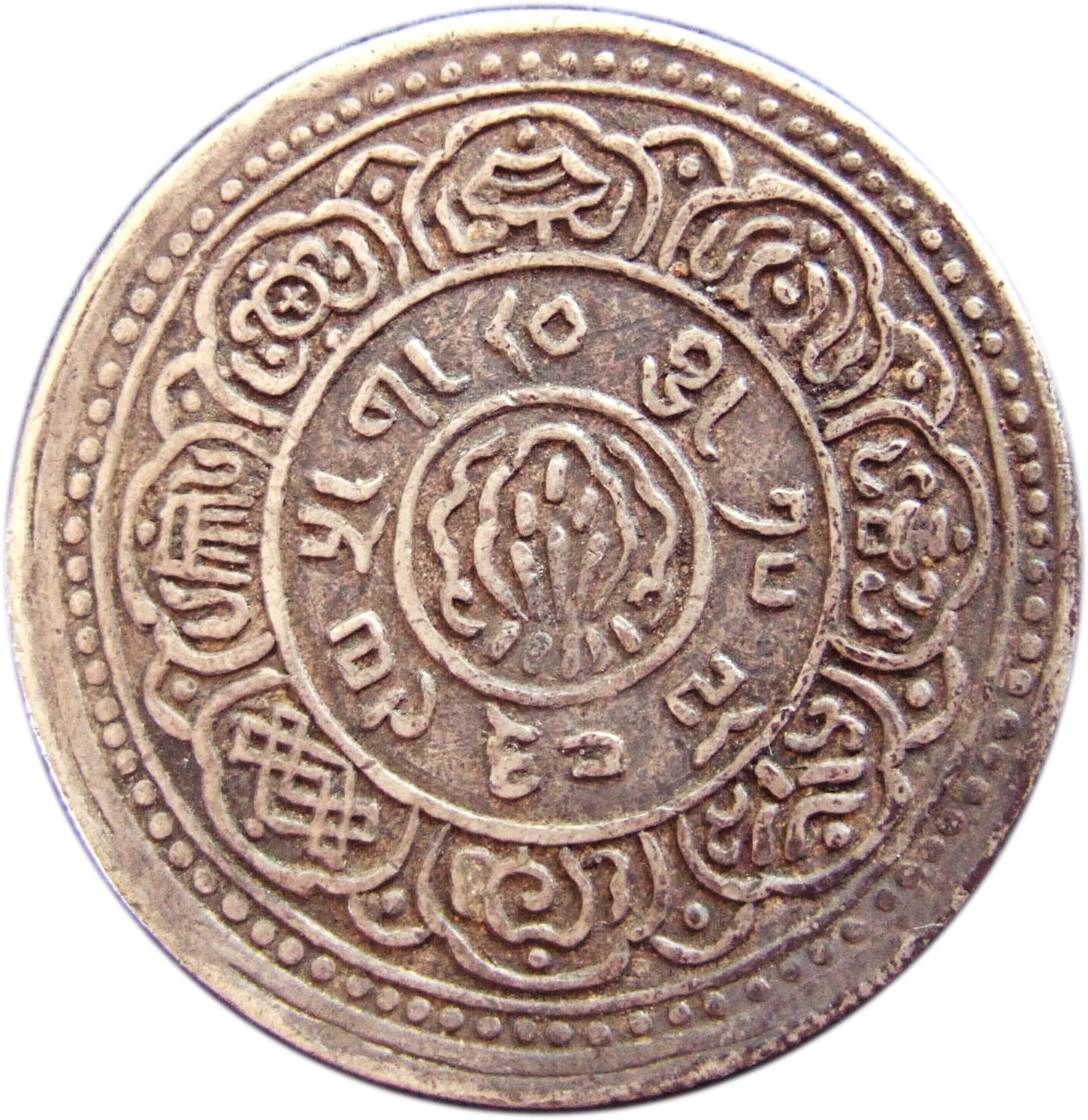
Tibetan 1 srang silver coin, dated 15–43 (AD 1909) reverse.

The use of historical money in Tibet started in ancient times, when Tibet had no coined currency of its own. Bartering was common, gold was a medium of exchange, and shell money and stone beads were used for very small purchases. A few coins from other countries were also occasionally in use.

Coins were first used in a more extensive way in the 17th century: these were silver coins supplied by Nepal. There were however various difficulties with this system. In 1763-64 and 1785, the first silver coins were struck in Tibet. In 1792 the first mass-produced silver coins were created under joint Chinese and local Tibetan authority. Coins bearing Tibetan inscriptions only were subsequently replaced by issues which had Chinese and Tibetan legends. This lasted until the 1830s. In 1840, purely Tibetan coinage was struck under Tibetan authority, and this coinage continued being made until 1954, with only two short interruptions when Sino-Tibetan coins were issued.

In 1910, the Tibetan government started producing a large range of copper and silver coins of different denominations, and in 1918 to 1921, gold coins were struck. Tibetan banknotes were first issued in 1913. From 1955 to 1959 no more Tibetan coins were created, although banknotes were still being printed, and by 1959 all of the money was gradually being replaced with renminbi yuan (the official currency of the People's Republic of China).

== Methods of exchange in ancient Tibet ==
In ancient Tibet, the use of coins was insignificant. Tibet's main neighbours, India, Nepal and China had had their own coinage since time immemorial. Ancient Tibet however had no locally-struck coinage, although a certain number of coins from Nepal, Chinese Turkestan and China had reached Tibet by way of trade, or as donations to important monasteries. Some of these foreign coins may have entered circulation, but they did not develop into an important instrument for transactions in daily life, because most of the trade within Tibet and also the foreign trade were carried out via barter.

=== Bartering ===
Tibet had the biggest trade volume with China, the main barter items being horses from north-eastern Tibet (Amdo), which were traded for Chinese tea. Tibet also exported medicinal herbs, stag antlers, musk and gold to China, and apart from tea, the Tibetan traders imported silk cloth, porcelain and silver from China.

The trade volume with Tibet's southern neighbours, India, Nepal and Bhutan, was much smaller. The Tibetan traders mainly exchanged salt and wool for grain (including rice) with these countries. Traditionally one measure of salt was traded for one measure of grain at the border with Nepal and India. Other, less important export goods were yak tails, musk and live animals (goats and sheep). For the 17th century, the export of falcons to India is also recorded.

For large transactions within Tibet, gold dust (probably tied up in small leather bags) and Chinese silver ingots were used. These ingots came in different shapes; the most common kind resembled horseshoes or donkey shoes, and were named "rta rmig ma" in Tibetan.

For small transactions, various consumer goods (which had about the same standard value among the majority of the Tibetans) could be used. Among others, these were areca nuts, tobacco, ceremonial scarves (khatas, also named khadags; Tibetan: kha btags) and tea Tea was usually traded in the form of tea bricks (Tibetan: ja sbag). This developed into the most important medium of exchange in the 19th century, when a regular coinage had already been introduced into Tibet.

=== Shell money and stone bead money ===
For very small purchases, cowries (small seashells which were mainly procured in the Maldive Islands and reached Tibet and China via Bengal) and stone beads are recorded as being in use as money in ancient Tibet

=== Gold currency before 1650 ===
Before the government of the 5th Dalai Lama was established various small gold ingots circulated in Tibet, some of which were marked with stamps. So far there exists no consent whether these pieces could be regarded as coins. We are well informed about this type of gold currency, which was called "gold sho" (Tibetan: gser sho) because officials of finance of the new Tibetan government received tax payments in the form of these small gold ingots. The officials had to convert these into the current monetary standard. In order to assess the fineness of these pieces one used a standardized gold weight unit, which was referred to as Sewa (Tibetan: se ba) The following types of gold pieces are recorded in lists of the finance officials:

| | Name | Gold Weight | Area where this Type circulated | Transcription according to Wylie |
|---|---|---|---|---|
| 1. | Phagsho | 30 Sewa | Possibly Phag ri | phag zho |
| 2. | Gugsho | 27 Sewa | mNga´ris | gug zho |
| 3. | Tagsho | 27 Sewa | sPu hreng | stag zho |
| 4. | Losho | 27 Sewa | sPu hreng | glo zho |
| 5. | Changsho | 24 Sewa | lHa ngam | byang zho |
| 6. | Gursho | 23 Sewa | gTsang stod tshong ´dus | mgur zho |
| 7. | Üsho | 20 Sewa | dBus | dbus zho |
| 8. | Esho | 19 Sewa | dBus | e zho |
| 9. | Gosho | 32 Sewa | In the area of Tashilhunpo | mgo zho |

Furthermore, pieces designated as Tsangsho (Tib.: gtsang zho) are mentioned, but their gold weight is not specified. Lastly a form of gold currency named Sertam (Tib.: gser tam) is mentioned which had a gold weight of 2 sewas. Fifteen Sertam corresponded to one standard Changsho (Chagsho Tshema; Tibetan: byang zho tshad ma). The currency unit Gursho (Tibetan: mgur-zho) was already mentioned by Sarat Chandra Das in his Tibetan-English Dictionary. According to this author 1 Gursho = 24 sewas.

=== Silver ingots ===
Chinese silver ingots (sycee) were used until the 20th century for larger transactions. They were referred to as rta rmig ma ("horse hoof") and normally weighed 50 tael, or 50 srang (c. 185 grams). There existed also silver ingots of smaller size, named gyag rmig ma (yak hoof) and yet smaller ones, referred to as ra rmig ma (goat hoof). In the early 20th century the large ingots were worth about 60–70 Indian rupees, the ingots of medium size 12–14 rupees and the smallest ingots 2–3 rupees. British-Indian authors occasionally refer to the silver bars found in Tibet, some of which were imported from Kashgar, as "yambus", an expression which derives from Chinese yuanbao.

== Coinage ==
=== Earliest coinage, 17th and 18th centuries ===
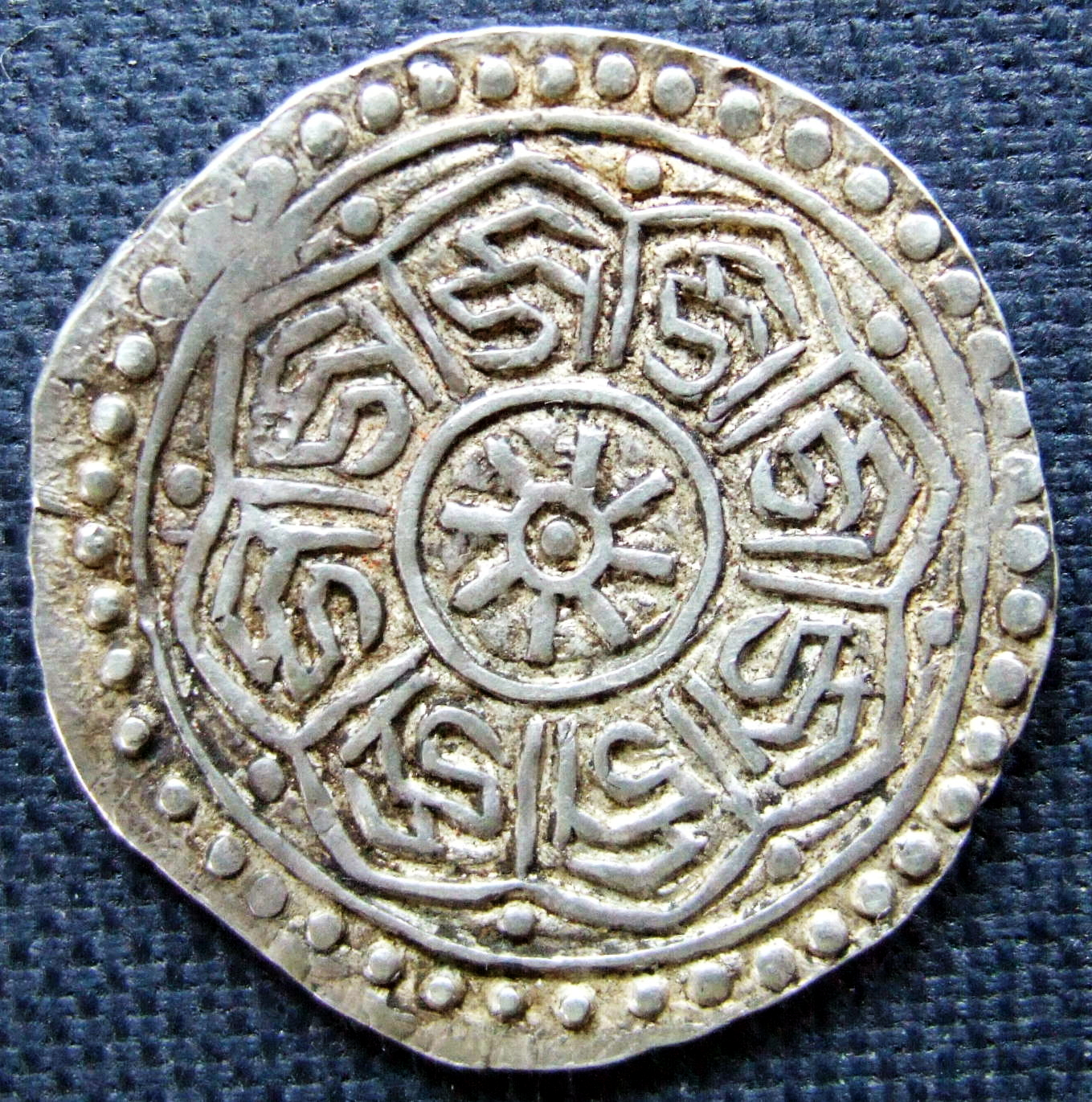
Tibetan undated silver tangka (2nd half of the 18th century) with eight times the syllable "dza" in vartula script, reverse. The Tibetan "dza" can be used to transcribe the Sanskrit syllable "ja" which can be short for "jaya" ("victorious"). The central design of the coin is a wheel with eight spokes which is a reference to the Buddhist "dharmacakra" ("wheel of law"). Thus the design and the inscription of the coin combined may have the meaning "victorious wheel of law", or, in a wider sense "victorious teaching of Buddha".

The first coinage which was extensively used in southern Tibet was silver coins, which were supplied by the Nepalese Malla Kingdoms and the first kings of the subsequent Shah dynasty from about 1640 until 1791.

Tibet provided the silver for the striking of these coins and received coins at the same weight, the Nepalese reaping a handsome profit by alloying the pure silver with copper before the striking of the coins. Owing to a dispute between Nepal and Tibet regarding the fineness of the silver coins supplied by Nepal, the export of these coins was disrupted after the mid-eighteenth century.

In order to overcome the shortage of coins in Tibet at that time, the Tibetan government started striking its own coins, modelled on Nepalese prototypes. This occurred in 1763-64 and again in 1785 without any interference by the Chinese government.

The Nepalese tried to carry on the very lucrative coin business during the Shah dynasty which had been established by Prithvi Narayan Shah in the Kathmandu Valley in 1768. First the Nepalese supplied mohars (silver coins which weighed about 5.4 grams) of good silver, but wanted these to circulate at the rate of one new mohar for two of the old adulterated silver coins struck by the Malla kings. This would have meant a tremendous loss for the Tibetan traders, and so the Tibetan Government did not accept these terms.

The second Shah king, who ruled from Kathmandu, Pratap Singh Shah, supplied alloyed silver coins during the period 1775 until 1777. Thereafter, when the Nepalese again tried to introduce into Tibet coins of good silver, which should have circulated at a considerable premium compared with the Malla and Pratap Simha coins, the Tibetans refused which resulted in a disruption of trade between Nepal and Tibet. Tibet again experimented with its own coinage in 1785, in order to mitigate the shortage of silver coins.

=== End of the 18th century ===
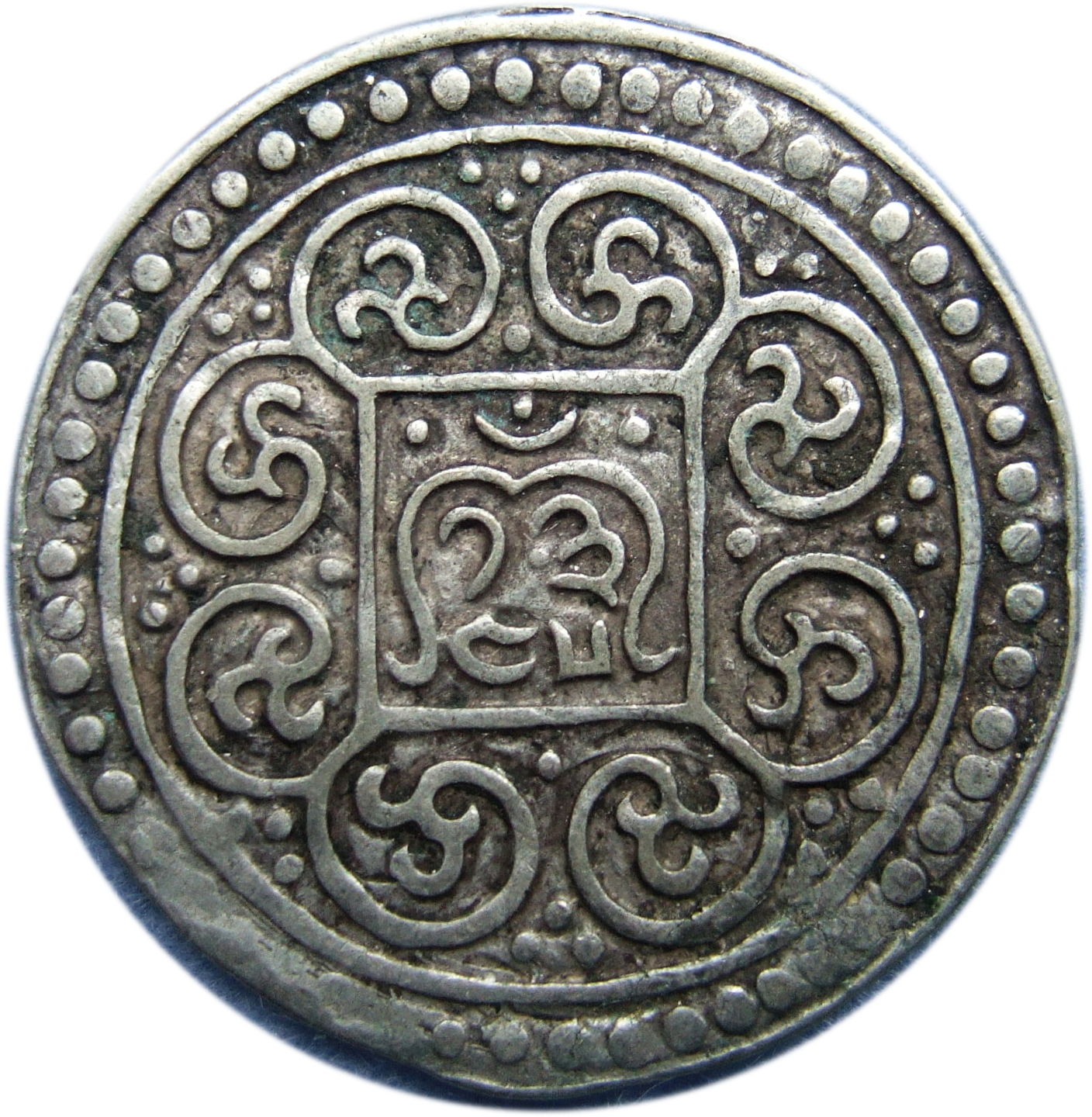
kong par tangka dated 13–45 (= AD 1791), obverse.

In order to resume the profitable coin export on their terms, the Nepalese invaded Tibet in 1788 and again in 1790/91. When the Tibetan Government turned to China for help, an imperial army was sent to Tibet. Together with the Tibetan army they managed to drive out the Nepalese by the autumn of 1792.

The Chinese took this opportunity to tighten their grip on Tibet, and issued an edict which among other dispositions stipulated the introduction of a new silver coinage, struck in the name of the Qianlong Emperor. In the same time it was from now on forbidden to import silver coins from Nepal. In order to solve temporarily the shortage of coins in Tibet when the Chinese army arrived in 1791, the Chinese had allowed the striking of the so-called "Kong-par tangkas" which were produced from alloyed silver and had a design copied from Nepalese prototypes. These tangkas which first were produced in the Kongpo province and later in Lhasa, were the first mass-produced silver coins of Tibet and had about the same weight as their Nepalese counterparts, i.e. about 5.2 grams. From 1793 new coins made from almost pure silver were struck in Lhasa. These had both Tibetan and Chinese inscriptions. Meanwhile, the striking of the Kong-par tangkas continued through the year 1792 and in early 1793. Both types of coins were authorised by the Chinese, and struck under joint Chinese and Tibetan supervision, but they were not part of the Chinese currency system, as silver coinage was unknown in China during the 18th and early 19th century (with the exception of the area which is now Xinjiang autonomous region).

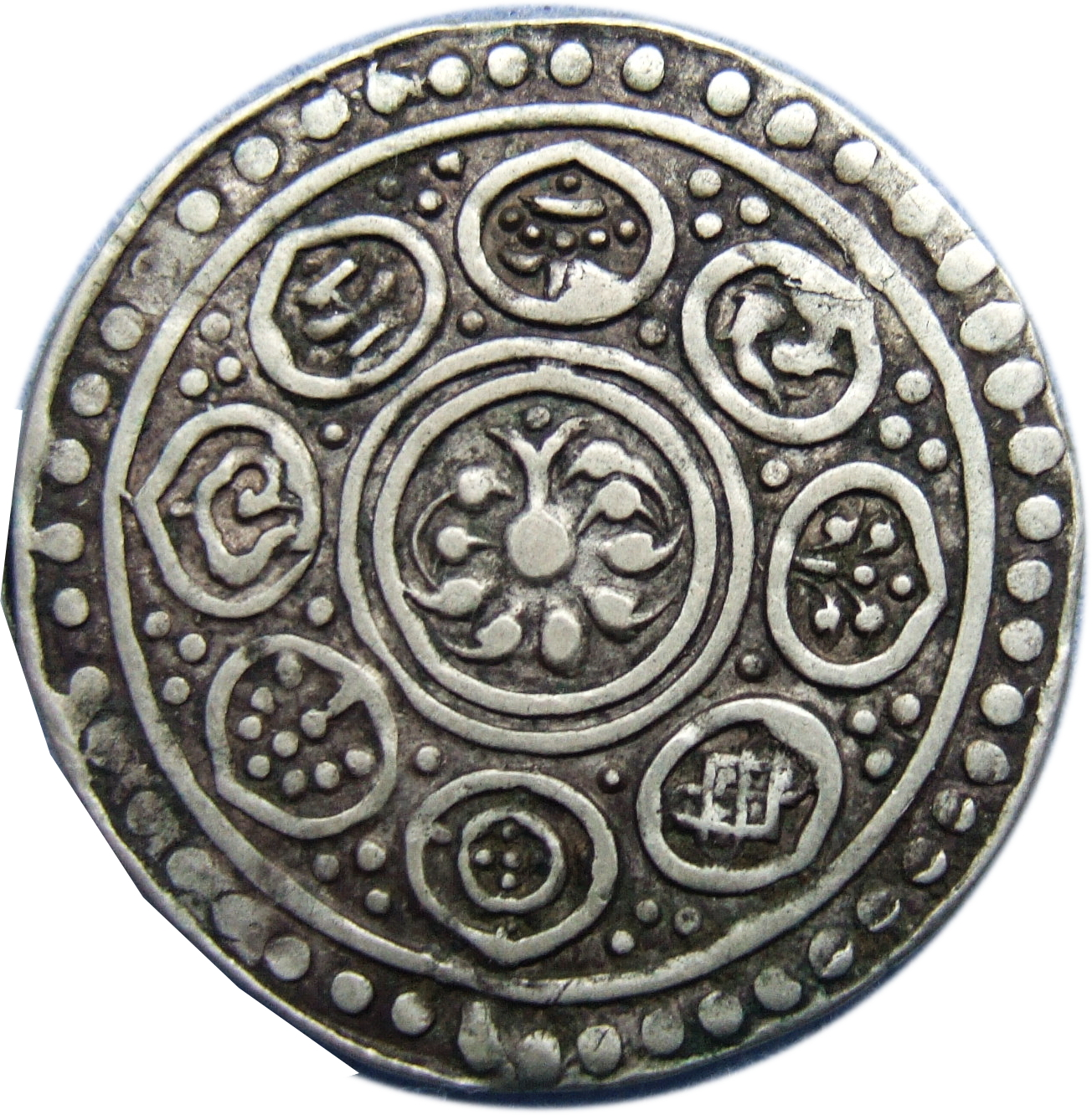
kong par tangka dated 13-45(= AD 1791), reverse

In 1791 it was originally planned by the Chinese authorities to cast copper cash coins in Tibet. Had this plan been carried out, the Tibetan coinage could have become part of the Chinese currency system. But this plan was abandoned because it was found to be too expensive to transport copper from China to Tibet in order to cast cash coinage in Lhasa.

Between 1791 and 1836 the Tibetan currency was largely decided on by the Chinese government in consultation with Tibetan authorities, and silver coins were struck to the sho (zho) standard (i.e. about 3.7 grams) in the 58th, 59th and 60th year of Qianlong (1793, 1794 and 1795).

A few silver coins were also struck in the 61st year of Qianlong (1796) who had abdicated towards the end of his 60th year in power. By the time the news of his abdication reached Lhasa, some silver coins of the 61st year had already been struck and released for circulation.

=== 19th century ===
Further Sino-Tibetan silver coins were struck in the first six years of the Jiaqing era (1796–1801), as well as during the 8th and 9th year (1803–04) and during the last two years of this reign, the 24th and 25th year (1819–20). During the Daoguang era which followed, silver coins were struck only in the first four years of this era (1821–24) and in the 15th and 16th year (1835–36).

=== 1840 to 1954, coinage of the Tibetan Government ===
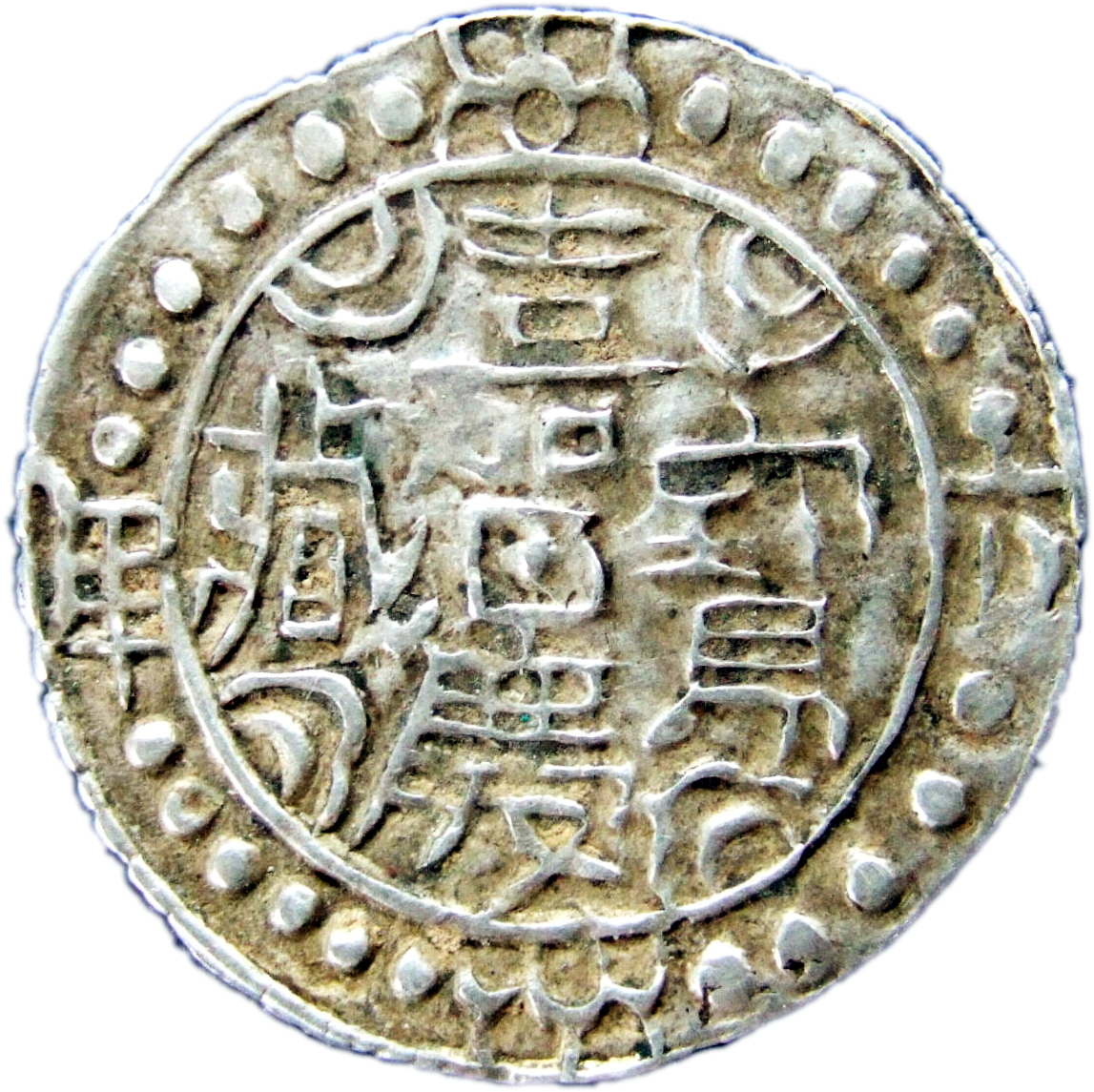
Sino-Tibetan coin of the 6th year of the Jiaqing era (1801)

Thereafter Chinese influence weakened in Tibet, and from 1840 until 1954 the Tibetan Government made decisions about Tibet's coinage system with just one incidental interference by the Chinese; the coins of this period had only Tibetan inscriptions and designs, and made no reference whatsoever to China.

The only incident which interrupted the production of purely Tibetan coins occurred during the short period of 1909 to 1910 when the Tibetan Government struck copper and silver coins dated to the first year of the Xuan Tong era (1909), and in 1910 when the Chinese Amban (representative of the Imperial Chinese Government) in Lhasa had silver and copper coins struck with legends in Chinese and Tibetan. These are the only coins minted in Tibet which can be considered as being part of the Chinese currency system of this period.

The only coin types which were produced in Lhasa between 1840 until 1908 were silver coins struck to the tangka standard of the newly created "Ganden tangka" (Nicholas Rhodes: The Gaden Tangka of Tibet. Oriental Numismatic Society, Occasional Paper, no. 17, January 1983) and of the earlier "Kong-par tangka" type.

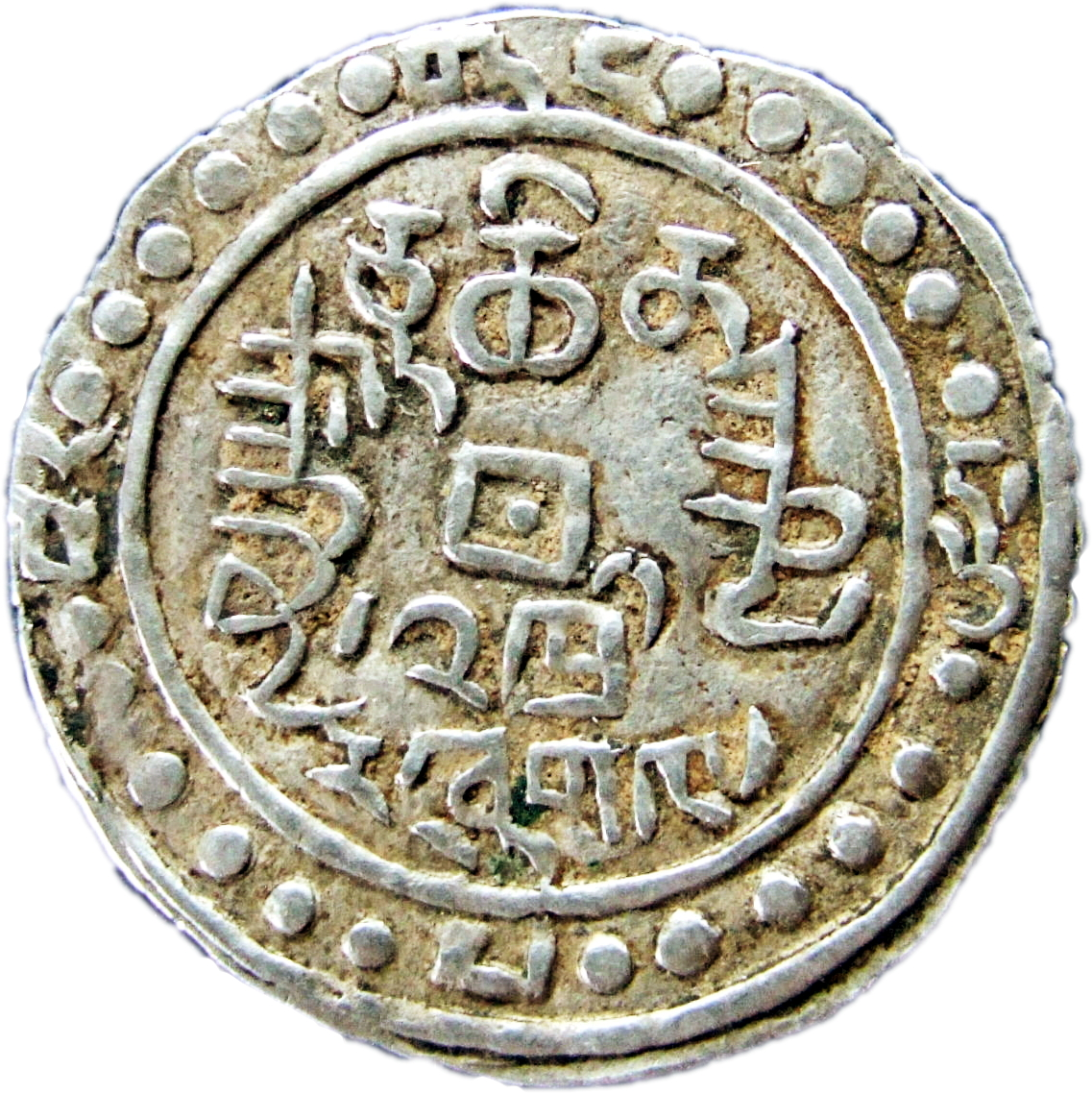
Sino-Tibetan coin of the 6th year of the Jiaqing era (1801) with Tibetan and Manchurian inscription (reverse)

After the already mentioned interruption of the purely Tibetan coin production towards the end of the Qing dynasty (1909/10), the Tibetan Government started producing a large selection of silver and copper coins in various denominations ranging from 2 ½ skar to 1 srang. Later silver coins of higher denominations were introduced: 1 ½ and 3 srang (1933–1938 and 1946) From 1949 until 1952 coins with the denomination "10 srang" which contained only about 10% silver, were struck; this is the highest denomination coin which was released for regular circulation in Tibet.

From 1918 until early 1921, gold coins of the denomination "20 srang" were struck in the Serkhang mint which was located near Norbulingka, the summer residence of the Dalai Lamas. These gold coins did not circulate very much in Tibet and were mainly used for storing wealth, or they were exported to India where a good profit could be obtained.

Silver tangkas of the "Ganden Tangka" design continued to be struck in the 20th century parallel to the various other denominations which were just mentioned. The last Tibetan silver coin of this design was produced in 1953/54; this was a special issue struck in fine silver for distribution to monks in the Lhasa area. These neatly machine-struck coins were valued at five srang.

From 1840 until 1932 Tibet's coins were struck by hand, and later with water-powered or man-powered locally made machines, in different mints located in or near Lhasa.

=== Circulation of foreign coins and the Sichuan rupee ===
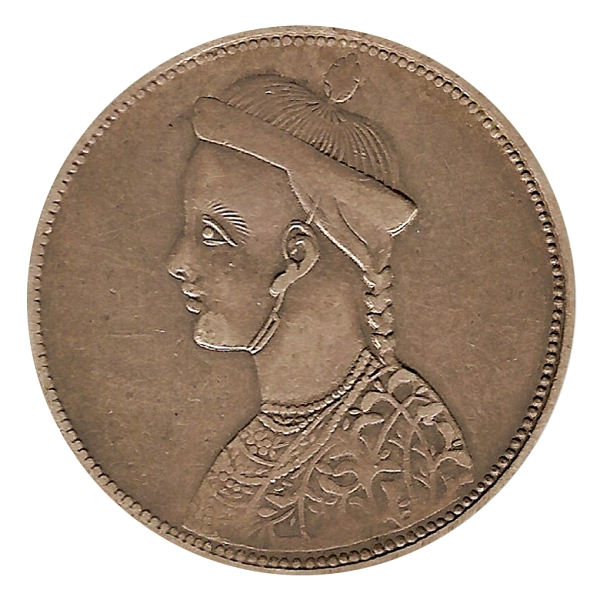
Sichuan Rupee. Early issue of good silver, struck in Chengdu in or after 1902. Obverse

During the second part of the 19th and the first third of the 20th century numerous foreign silver coins circulated in Tibet. Most of them were traded by weight, such as Mexican and Spanish American silver dollars, Russian roubles and German marks. The exception were British Indian rupees, particularly the ones with the portrait of Queen Victoria, which widely circulated in Tibet and were mostly preferred to Tibetan coins. These rupees were of good silver and had a fixed value, exchanging for three tangkas until about 1920 and in later years of the 20th century they considerably increased in value. The Chinese authorities saw the popularity of the Indian rupees among Tibetan traders with misgivings and in 1902 started striking their own rupees which were close copies of the Indian Victoria rupees, the portrait of the Queen being replaced by that of a Chinese mandarin, or, as most numismatists believe, of the Guangxu Emperor of China. The Chinese rupees were struck in Chengdu and, starting in the 1930s also in Kangding, the former Tibeto-Chinese border town in western Sichuan. The first issues were of good silver and could gain a certain popularity among the Tibetans, but later issues, particularly the ones minted in Kangding, had a considerable amount of alloy, and were therefore not accepted by many traders. In the early minting-period also a small number of half and quarter rupees were struck in Chengdu. Since they often ended up as buttons or as parts of silver jewellery, their production was soon discontinued, and, when small change was needed, the whole rupees were cut in half or were quartered with the help of a sword and a hammer. The total mintage figure of the half rupees was 130,000 and that of the quarter rupees 120,000. It is estimated that between 25,500,000 and 27,500,000 Sichuan rupees were minted between 1902 and 1942.

== Tibetan banknotes ==
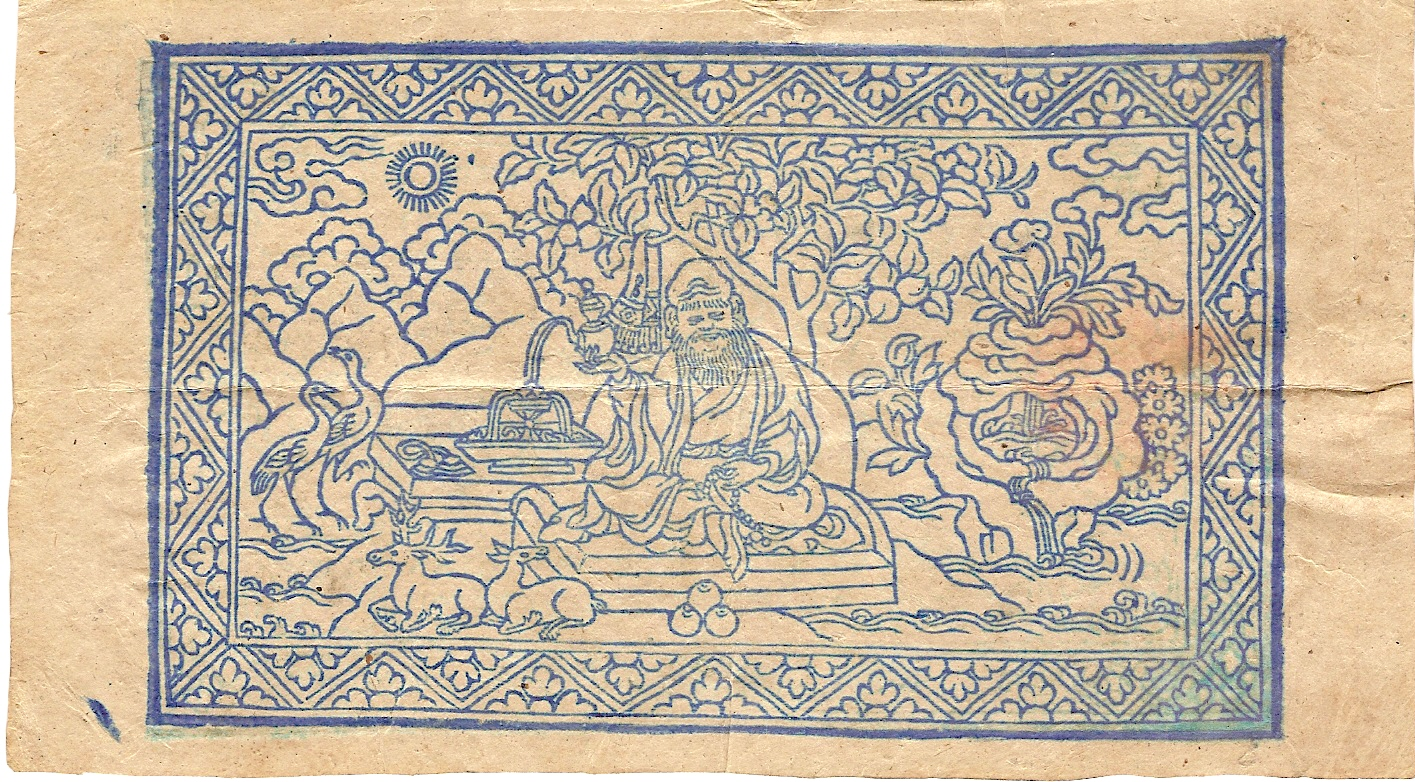
50 Tam Banknote, dated Tibetan Era 1659 (= 1913) Reverse. The central panel shows a scene called in Tibetan tshe ring rnam drug (“six [symbols] of long life”), consisting of an old man (mi tshe ring) sitting under what most probably is a peach tree, his left hand resting in his lap and holding a rosary, his raised right hand holding a water pot. Three jewels are placed in front of him and to his right are seen a pair of deer and a pair of cranes. A waterfall, a large rock in the shape of a conch, and flowers appear to the old man's left. The pair of deer, the two cranes, the rock, the waterfall, the peach tree, and the old man himself are all symbols associated with longevity.

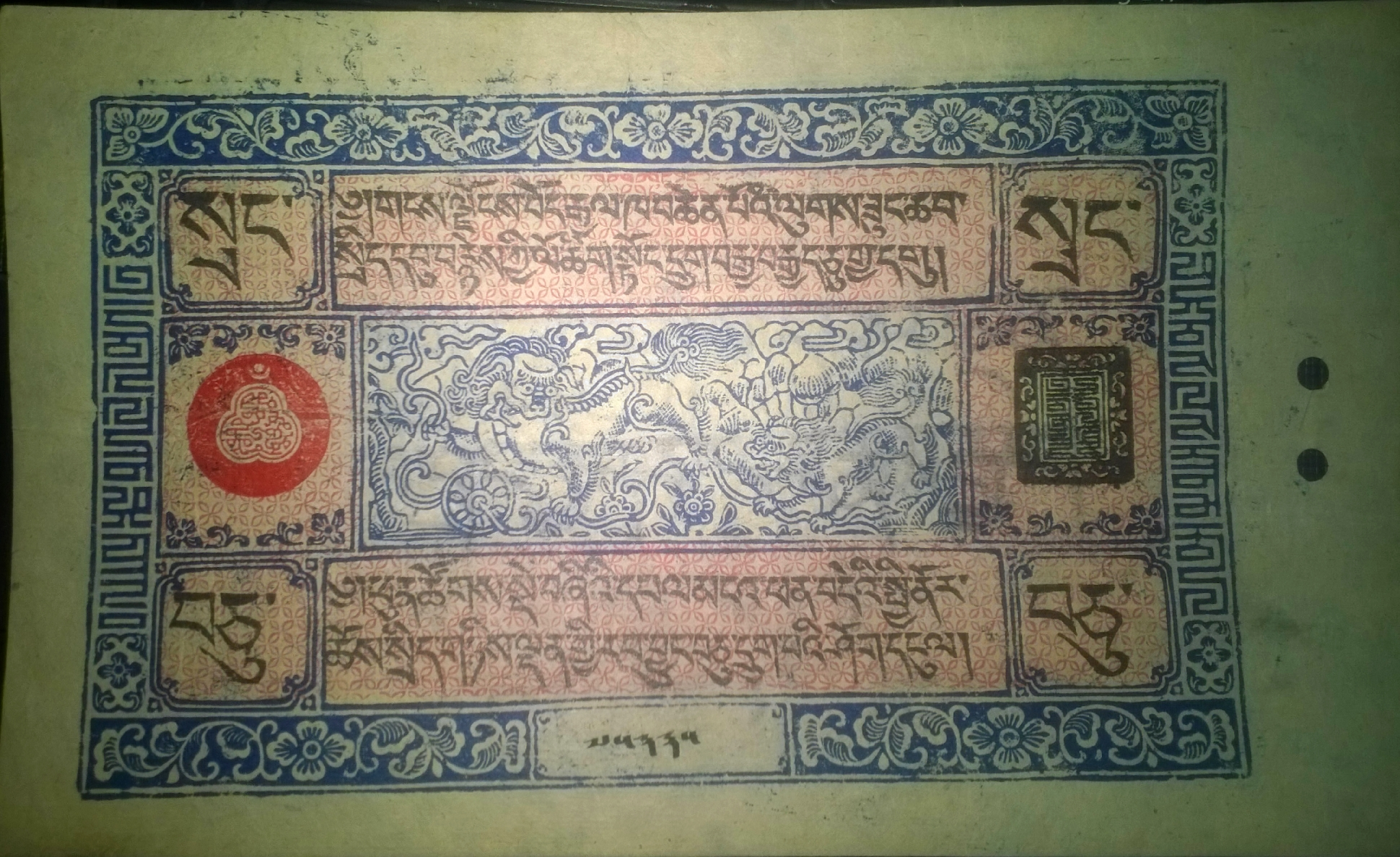
10 Srang

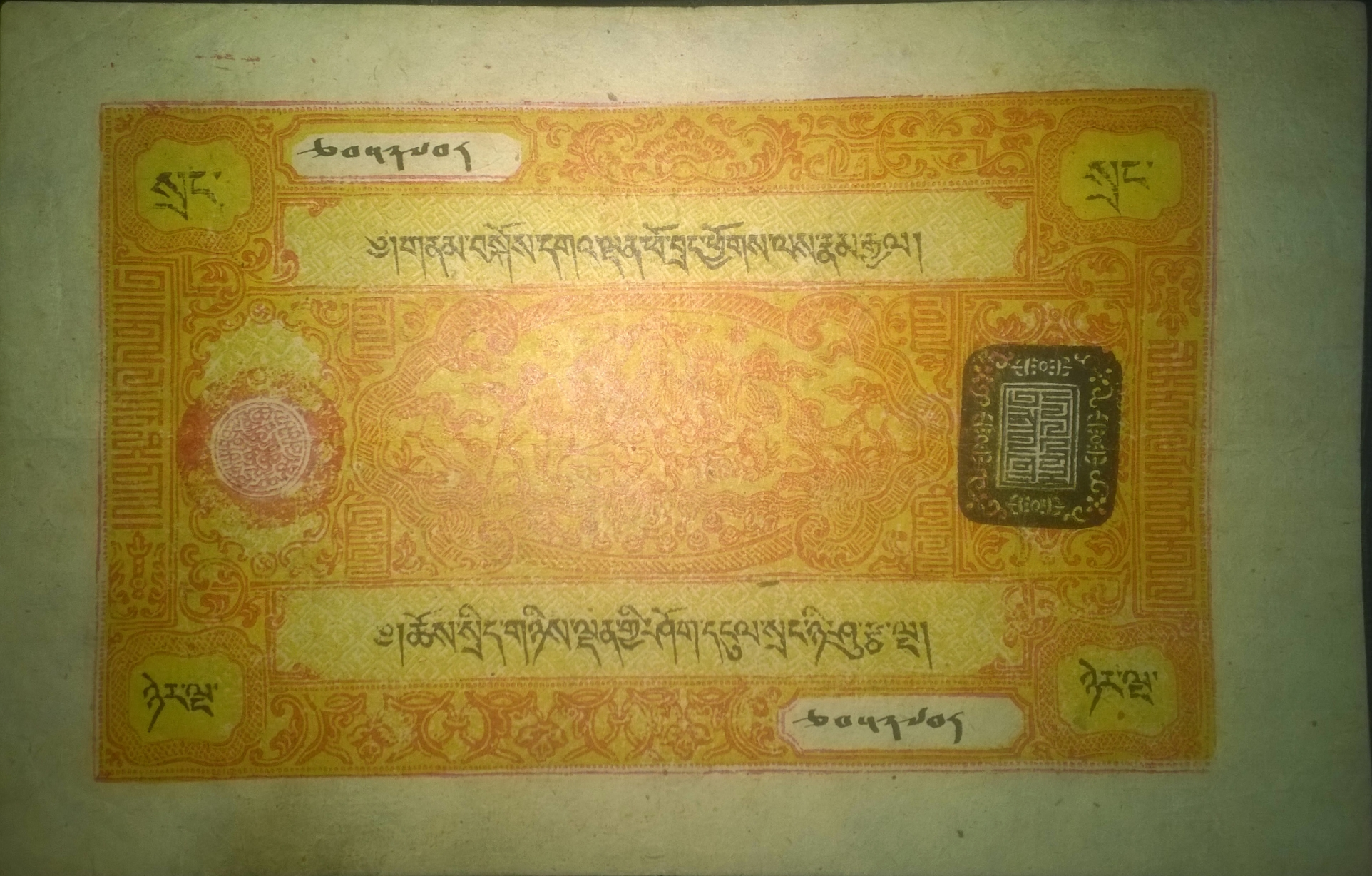
25 Srang

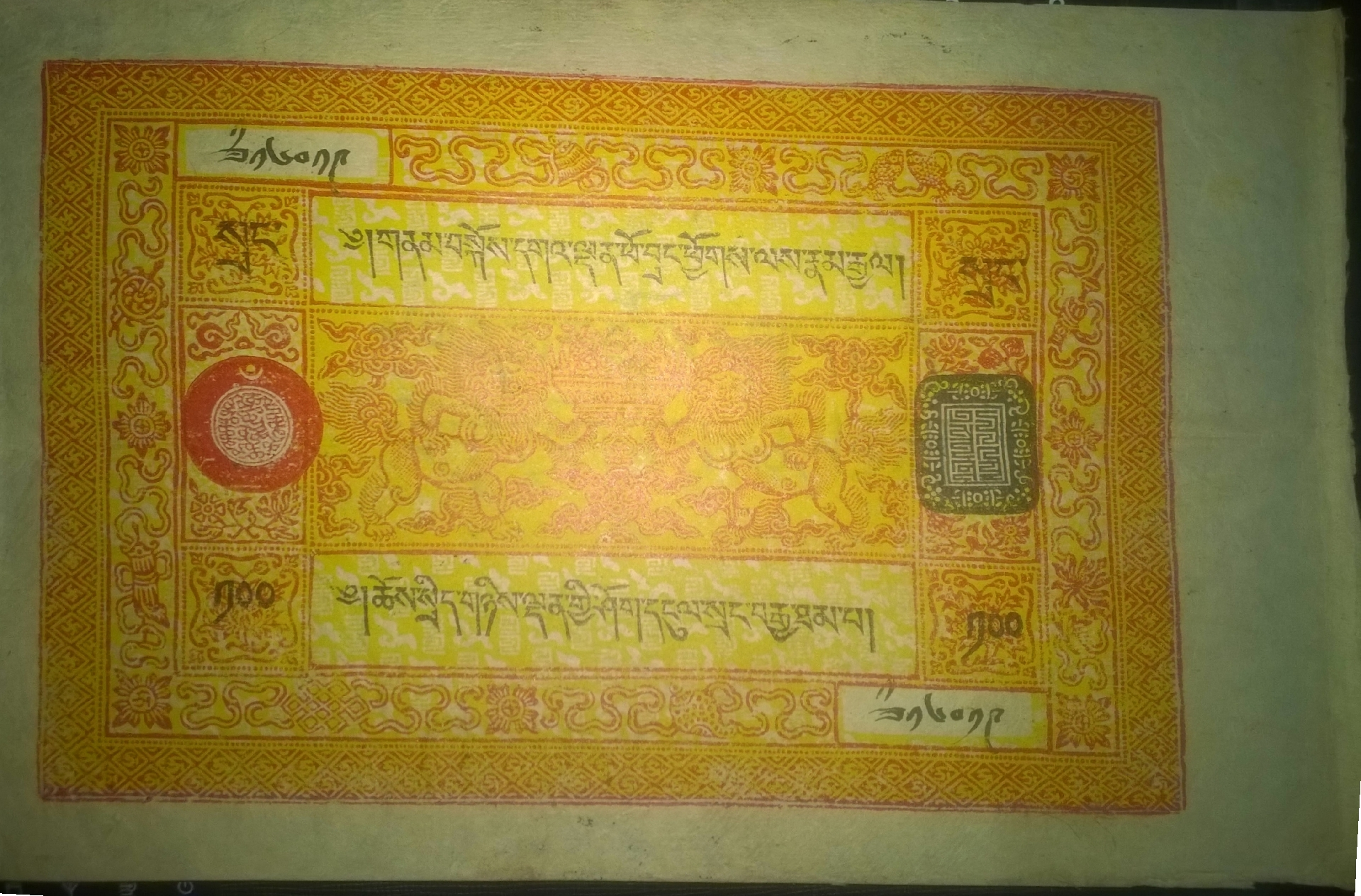
100 Srang

Tibetan banknotes were first issued in January 1913 with the denominations of 5 tam (green or blue) and 10 tam (red). These were dated to the year 1658 of the Tibetan Era (which began in AD 1912 and ended in early 1913). Further issues followed later in AD 1913. All these notes are dated to the Tibetan Era year 1659, which began in February AD 1913. They are as follows: a 10 tam note (red), a 15 tam note (violet), a 25 tam note (brown or yellow), and a 50 tam note (blue or purple). Like the two earlier issues, they bear a red seal representing the authority of the Dalai Lama and a black seal which has the following inscription in 'phags pa ( also called "seal script") Tibetan script: gzhung dngul khang, and can be translated as "government treasury" or "government bank". The five tam notes continued to be printed, but the date on this notes was not changed, i.e. it remained T.E. (Tibetan Era) 1658. The early Tibetan notes were woodblock printed on locally produced paper and were hand-numbered with black ink by specially trained Tibetan calligraphists. In the 1930s they were withdrawn from circulation. They bear the following inscription on the obverse:

"Gangs ljongs bod rgyal khab chen po´i lugs zung chab
"Srid dbu brnyes kyi lo chig stong drug brgya bcu nga brgyad
"Phun tshogs sde bzhi´i dpal mnga´ phan bde´i spyi nor
"Chos srid gnyis ldan gyi rab byung bco lnga pa´i[ba ´i] shog dngul."

The following translation has been suggested for this legend:
1658 years from the founding of the religious-secular form of government in the great country of Tibet, the land of snows, paper money (shog dngul) of the 15th cycle (rab byung bco lnga) of the government of religion and politics (chos srid gnyis ldan), the universal jewel (spyi nor) of benefit and bless, endowed with the four types of auspiciousness.

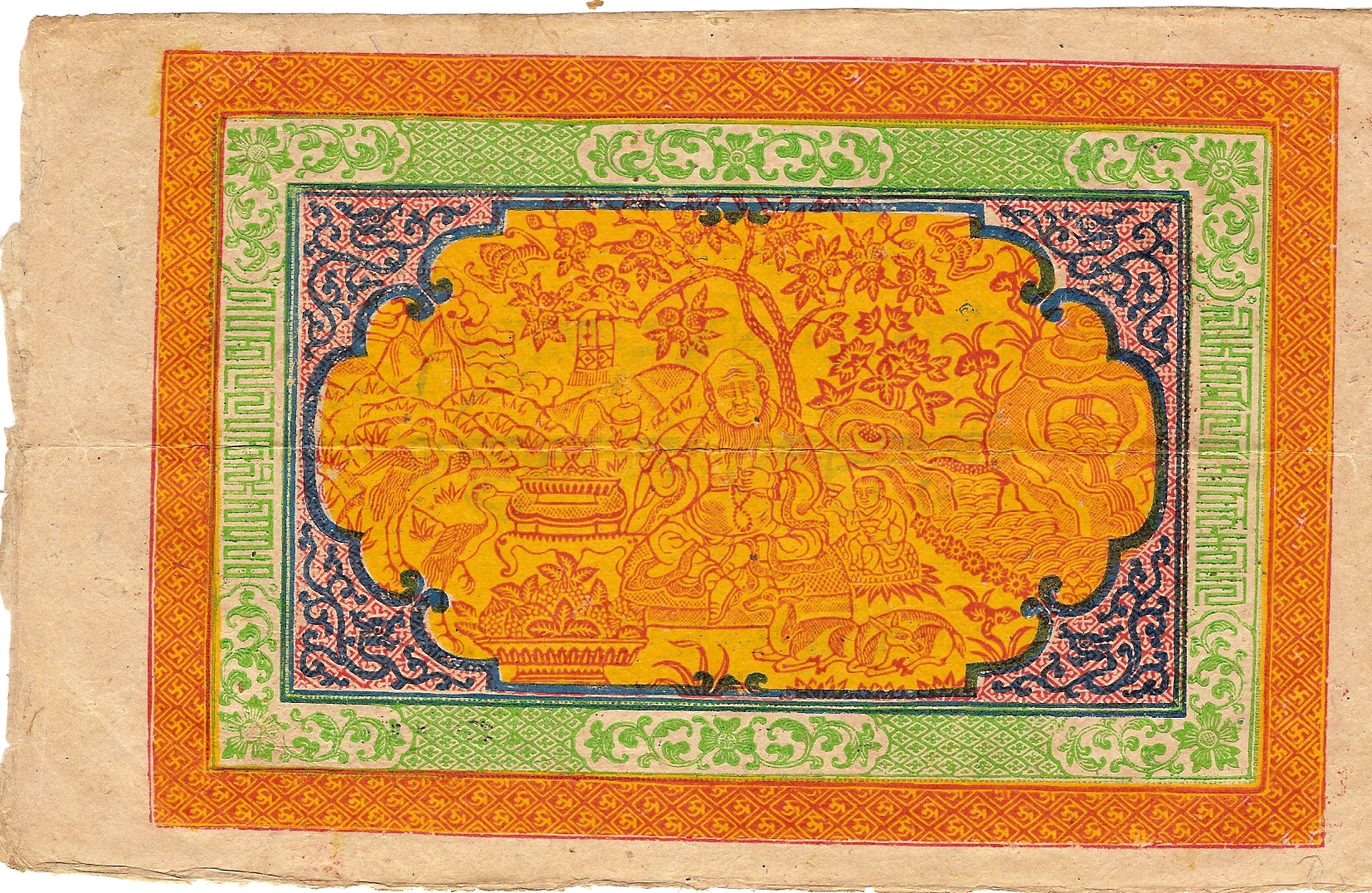
Undated 100 Tam Srang banknote, issued ca. in 1938. Reverse. The scene within the central cartouche is similar to that seen on the backside of the 50 tam note. However, the peach tree has been replaced by a pomegranate tree and in the upper left and right corners two bats, emblems for good luck, have been added.

The highest denomination note (50 tam) was often forged, and the Tibetan government decided to introduce a new multicoloured version printed in a more sophisticated manner. The legends on the obverse were printed from woodblocks, while the remaining design on both sides was machine-printed using several different metal blocks. The first notes of this new issue were dated T.E. 1672 (= AD 1926). New notes of this denomination were produced every year until T.E. 1687 (= AD 1941).

In 1937 or '38 new multicolored notes with the high denomination 100 tam srang were introduced. They bear the same octagonal red seal as the early "tam" denominated notes and a black seal of a new type which bears the following inscription: Srid zhi dpal ´bar.

This legend refers to the Tibetan government mint. The following translations have been suggested: "Two famous Governments"; "The Glory of both (lay and religious) Governments´ houses" "May every form of being augment the good" and "Government, peace and progress." A freer translation would read: "A peaceful government (generates) prosperity".

The denomination of these notes was soon changed from "tam srang" to "srang" and they were given a smaller circular red seal. The 100 srang notes are machine-printed and hand-numbered; they were regularly issued between 1939 and 1945 and again between 1951 and 1959 but bear no date. Numerous notes of this denomination have survived and they are relatively common on the numismatic market.

Further machine-printed "srang" denominated notes followed. In 1940 saw the issue of "10 srang" notes bearing the date T.E. 1686. These were machine-printed in three colors (red, blue and black) and carried different T.E. dates until T.E. 1694 (= AD 1948). An undated "5 srang" note of small size was issued between 1942 and 1946. Finally, an undated "25 srang" note was introduced in 1950 and was issued until 1955.

All the Tibetan srang-denominated banknotes were machine-printed on locally made paper at the government mint of Trabshi Lekhung using inks imported from India. All denominations are hand-numbered.

In 1959 these issues were withdrawn from circulation and replaced by Chinese banknotes denominated in Renminbi Yuan.

== Tibetan mints ==
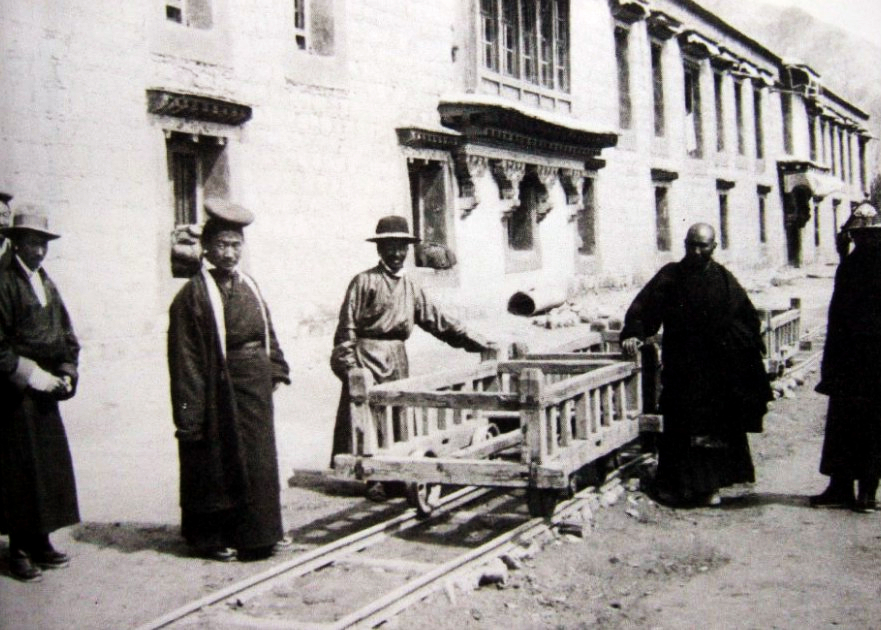
Trabshi Lekhung, 1933

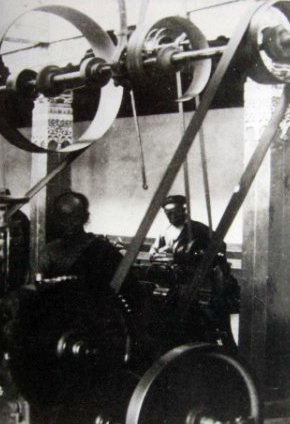
Trabshi Lekhung, 1933

Among the most important mints in the early 20th century were one known by the name 'dod dpal (las khung) located in Shol, below the Potala Palace, and one located about 10 kilometers north/northeast of Lhasa in the Dode valley (dog bde or dog sde valley)

Another important mint was located in Trabshi (4 kilometers north of Lhasa on the way to Sera monastery). This mint was modernized in the early 1930s, all the machinery of the other mints was subsequently transferred to this establishment, which was operated as the only Tibetan Government mint from 1932 onwards It had the official name Trabshi Lotrü Lekhung (grwa bzhi glog ´khrul las khung, the "Trabshi electric machine factory"). Nowadays the huge compound of the former mint is occupied by one of Lhasa's several prisons, known as "Trabshi Prison".

Furthermore, a mint named gser khang ("gold house"), located west of the Norbu Lingka, was in operation in the 1920s for the striking of gold and copper coins. A mint referred to as Mekyi (Tibetan me kyid; short for me tog skyid po meaning "enjoyable flowers") was located in the residence of the Chinese Amban and was perhaps used by the Chinese in 1910 to strike Sino-Tibetan coins. It was taken over by the Tibetan government after the forced departure of the last Amban in 1913, and coins were minted there between 1914 and the early 1930s. An establishment located south of the Kyichu (river) near Lhasa, known as Tip Arsenal, is occasionally mentioned as mint", but there is no evidence that coins were struck there. A small factory destined for the production of copper blanks existed in the Chumbi valley about halfway between Yatung and the Tibeto-Sikkimese border; its name was Norbu Tsoki (Tibetan: nor bu mthso dkyil) and it was operational between 1923 and 1928.

The coins of the 18th and 19th century were struck by hand and those of the early 20th century by locally built, water- or man-powered machines. From the 1920s coins were struck by machines imported from England and from British India, first on an experimental basis in 1928 and 1929, and then on a large scale from 1932 to 1938, and again from 1946 to 1954. The electric power for these machines was supplied by a hydroelectric power plant in the Dode valley which was set up between 1927 and 1928 with equipment which had been imported from England in 1924.

== 1955–1959 ==
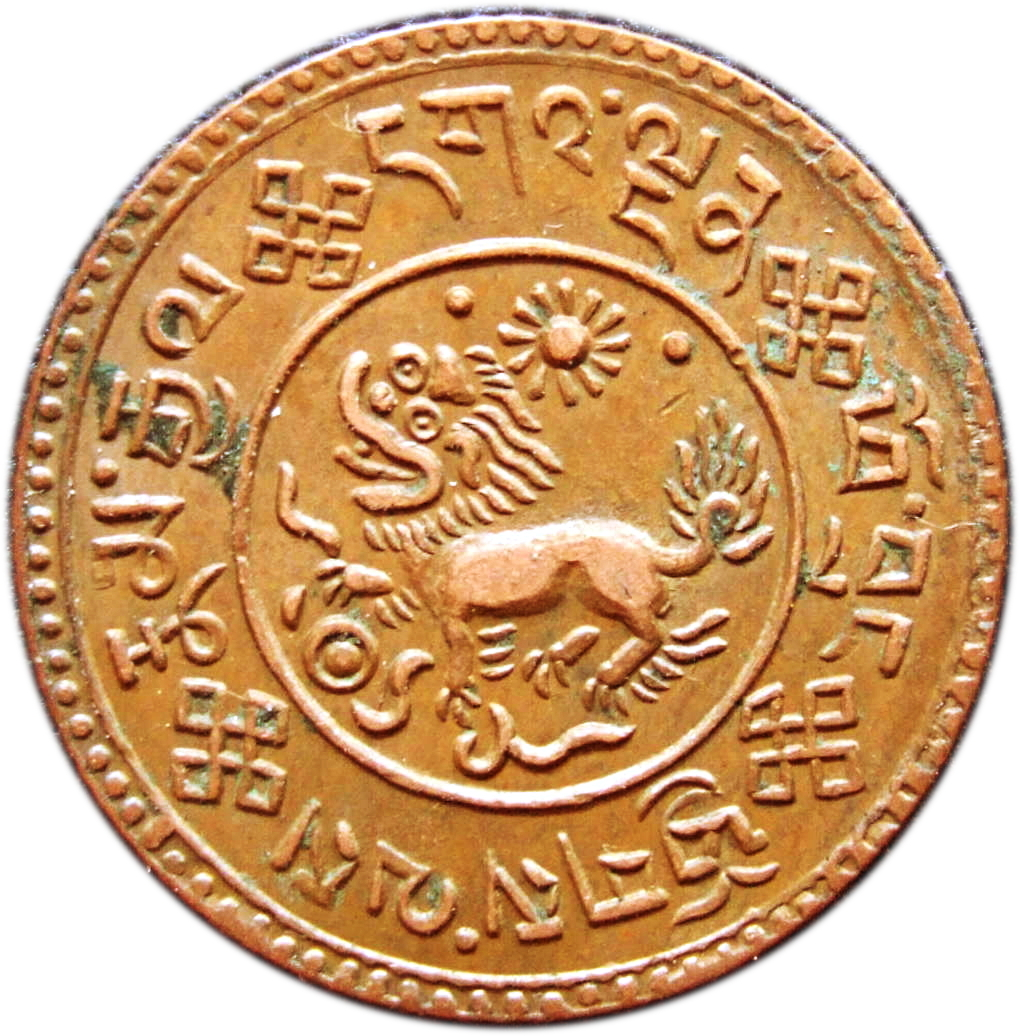
Copper coin of 1 sho, dated 16-6 (= AD 1932), obverse.

After the Battle of Chamdo in 1950-51 the renewed interference of the Chinese resulted in a situation where no more coins were struck from 1955 and 1959. However, paper notes of 100 srang were still printed. In the early 1950s the Chinese restruck dollars with the portrait of Yuan Shikai in the Chengdu mint. These were introduced into Tibet to pay Tibetan workers involved in road building and to buy the goodwill of influential Tibetans. Many Yuan Shikai dollars were smuggled to India by Tibetan traders who bought western goods in Calcutta which they sold at considerable profits to Chinese Army members in Lhasa.

== After 1959 ==
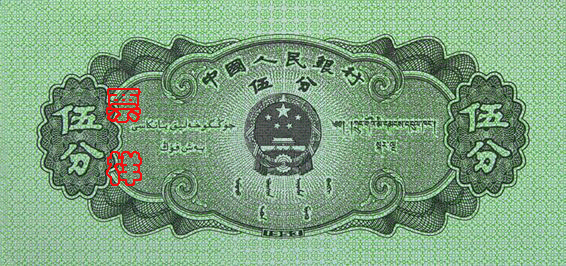
Five mimang shogngul skar banknote issued in 1953, which was still valid until 2007

During the great exodus of Tibetans, by the middle of 1959, also the circulation of bank notes stopped, when the PRC introduced the mimang shogngul (= "people's paper money") currency into Tibet, eventually replacing the traditional Tibetan money.

Since 1959, mimang shogngul sgor (Tibetan: སྒོར་, ZWPY: Gor) is used. One sgor is divided into 10 sgor-zur (Tibetan: སྒོར་ཟུར་, ZWPY: Gorsur) or 100 skar (Tibetan: སྐར་, ZWPY: Gar).

One sgor is called gor gcig (Tibetan: སྒོར་གཅིག།) while one skar is called skargang (Tibetan: སྐར་གང༌།).

== Dates on Tibetan coins ==
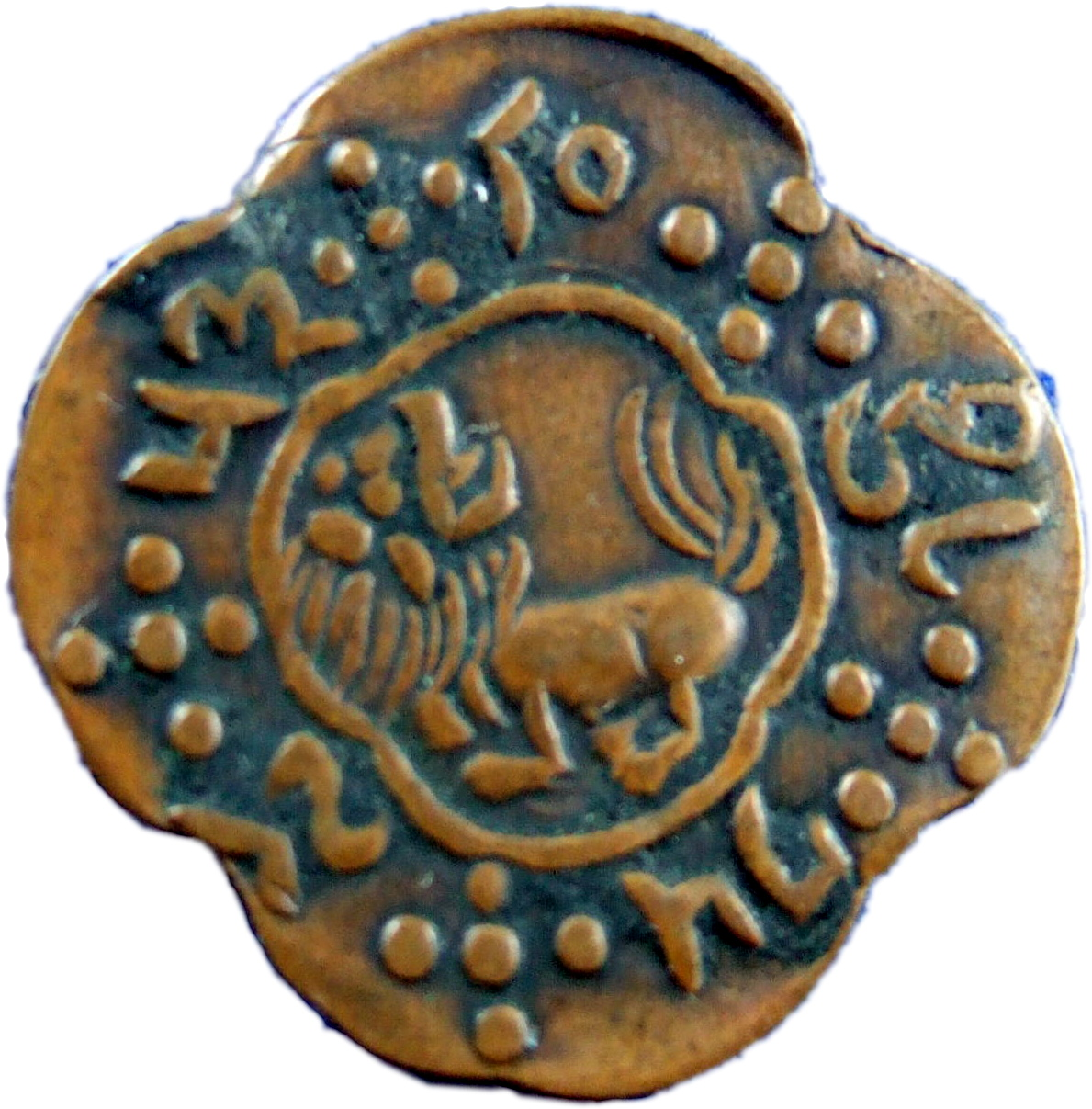
Tibetan 2½ skar copper coin, dated 15-53 (= AD 1919), obverse

Except for the Sino-Tibetan coins, the early undated tangkas of the 18th century, and the undated Ganden tangka issues, all Tibetan coins are inscribed with the cycle and the year in which they were struck. Each cycle comprises 60 years. The first year of the first cycle corresponds to the western year AD 1027.

According to Tibetan tradition, the Kalachakra (dus kyi ‘khor lo) was introduced into Tibet from India in the year 1026. Therefore the dates found on Tibetan coins record the number of years which have elapsed since this historical event. In order to convert a cycle date of a Tibetan coin into a western date one can use the following formula: (Number of cycles minus 1) times 60, plus number of years, plus 1026.

Example: rab byung 15 lo 43 means that 14 complete cycles plus 43 years of the 15th cycle have elapsed since the year 1026. This date can be converted as follows: (15 – 1) × 60 + 43 + 1026 = AD 1909.

It is necessary to know that the Tibetan year usually starts some time in what is the month of February according to the calendar of the Western World. Therefore the coin of the above example cannot have been struck as early as January 1909, but may have been struck as late as January or early February 1910.

== Tibetan currency units ==
Tibet had a dual and therefore complicated system of currency units. One was imported from Nepal and its basic unit was the "tangka" (also called "trangka" "tam" or "tamga"; equivalent to about 5.4 to 5.6 grams of alloyed silver). The other was imported from China and its basic unit was the "srang" (Chinese liang, equivalent to 37.3 grams of silver). These two systems were used in Tibet concurrently from about 1640 until 1959.

| Calculating respective values of currency units | The subdivisions of the srang | Silver coins, solely struck in the 18th and 19th century |
|---|---|---|
| 1 srang = 6 2/3 tangkas; 1 tangka = 1 ½ sho = 15 skar; ½ tangka = 7 ½ skar; 1 sho = 2/3 tangka = 10 skar | 1 srang = 10 sho = 100 skar; 1 sho = 10 skar; 1 srang was called "srang gang"; 1 sho was called "zho gang"; 2 sho were called "zho do" | ½ sho; ½ tangka = ¾ sho; 1 sho; 1 tangka |

The small units of ½ sho and ½ tangka were only struck for circulation in small numbers in 1793. There also exist some ½ sho coins dated Qianlong 59. These however are extremely rare, and most of them probably have to be considered as patterns or prototypes.

In the 20th century, the following units were struck:

| Copper | Silver or billon | Gold |
|---|---|---|
| ½ skar ("skar che"); 1 skar ("skar gang"); 1/8 sho; ¼ sho; 2 ½ skar ("skar phyed gsum" or "kha gang"); 5 skar ("skar lnga"); 7 ½ skar ("skar phyed brgyad"); 1 sho ("zho gang"); 3 sho ("zho gsum"); 5 sho ("zho lnga") | 1 tangka; 1 sho ("zho gang"); 2 sho ("zho do"); 5 sho ("zho lnga"); 1 srang ("srang gang"); 1 ½ srang ("srang gang zho lnga"); 3 srang ("srang gsum"); 5 srang (in limited numbers; this coin was also struck in copper); 10 srang ("srang bcu") | 20 srang ("gser tam") |

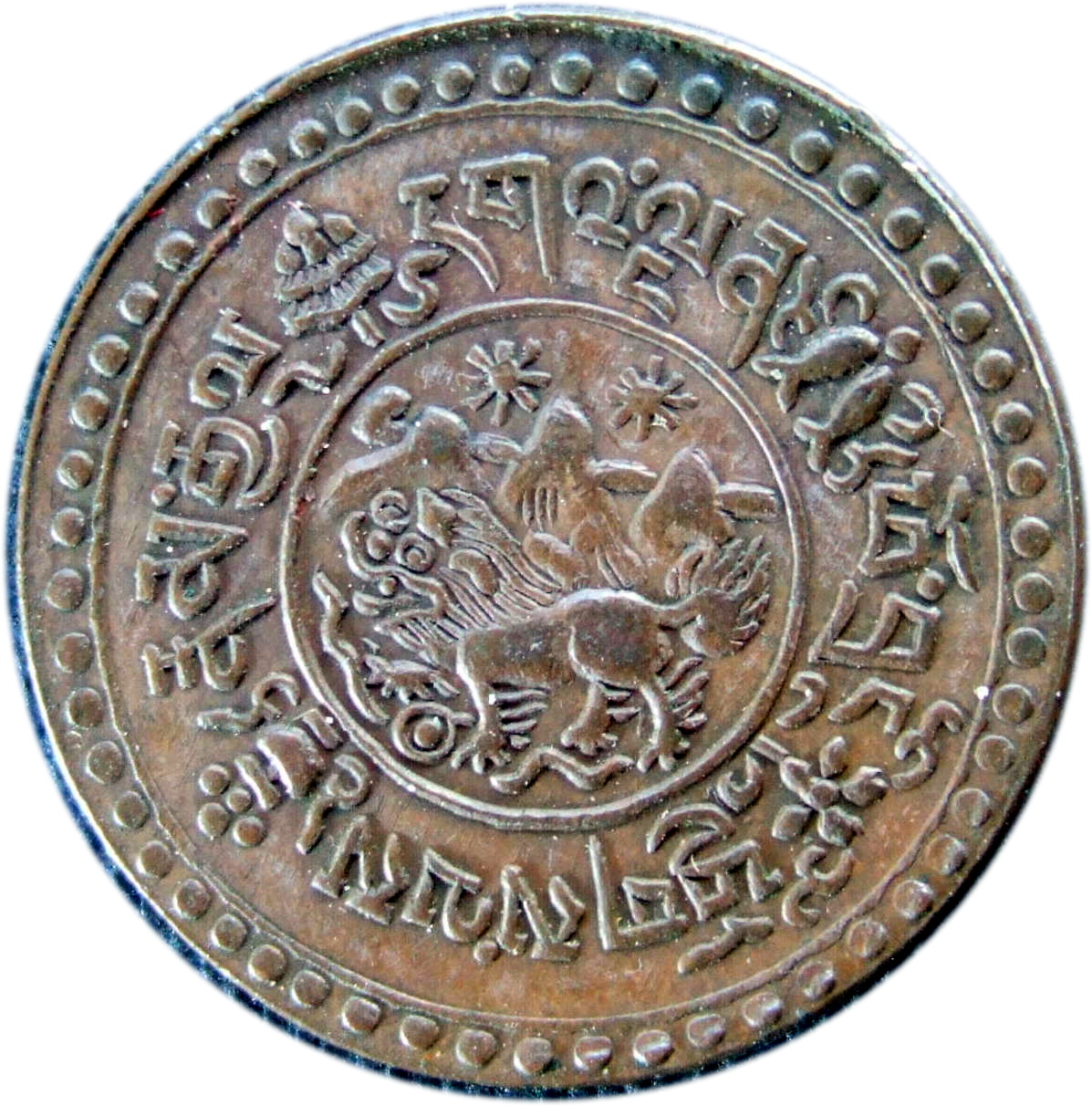
3 Sho copper coin dated 16-20 (= AD 1946), obverse

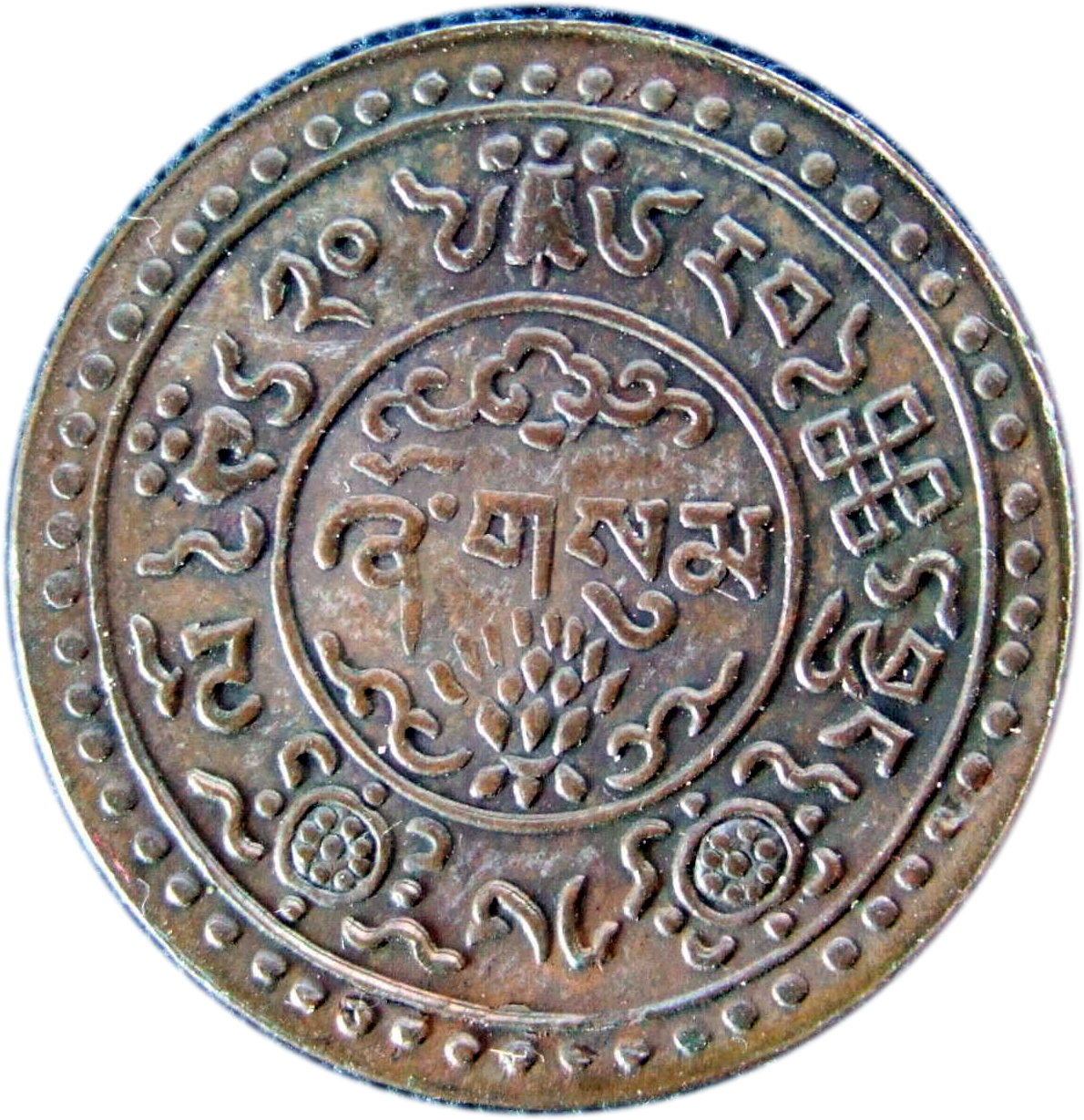
3 Sho copper coin dated 16-20 (= AD 1946), reverse

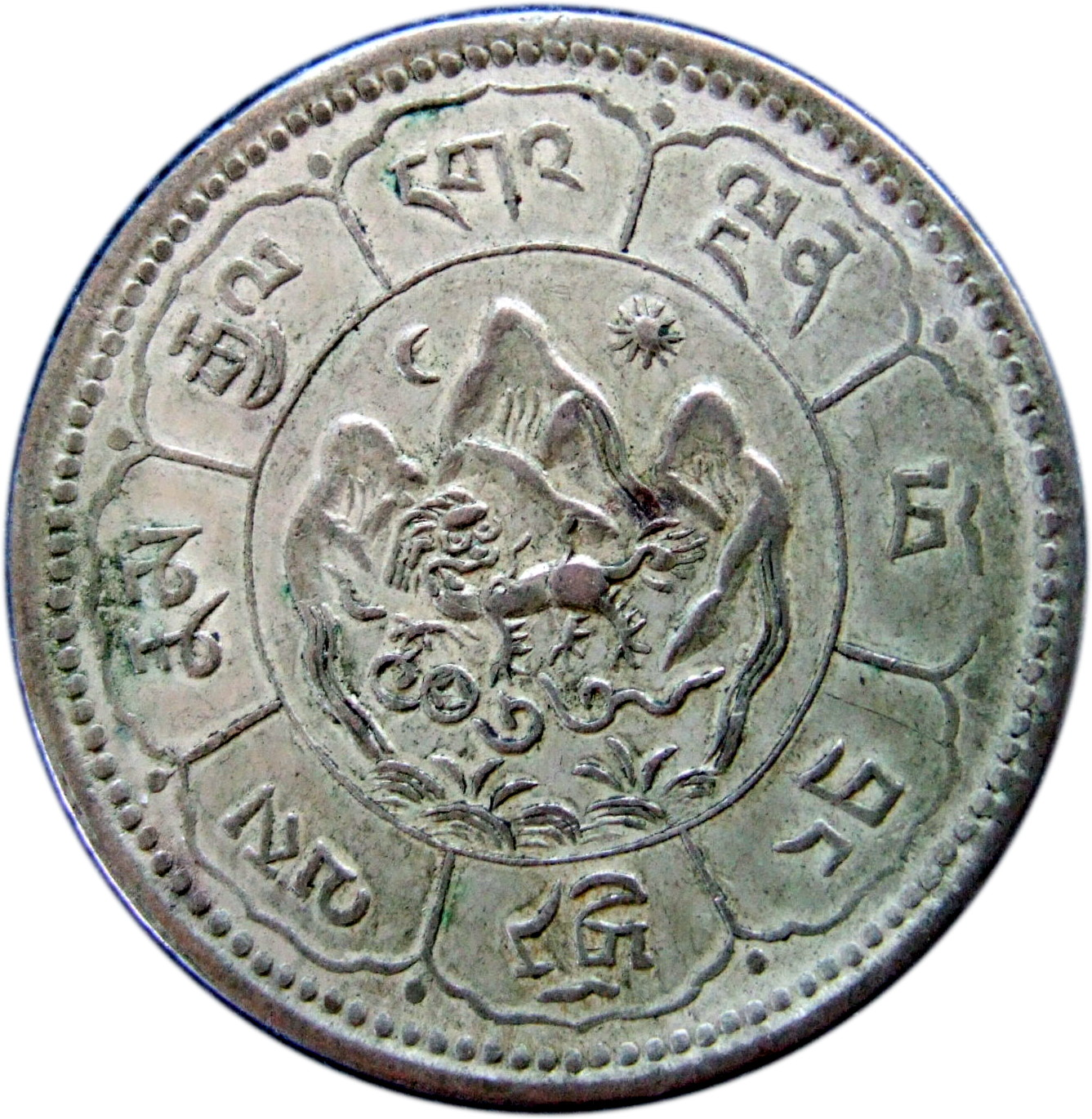
10 Srang billon coin, dated 16-24 ( = AD 1950), obverse.

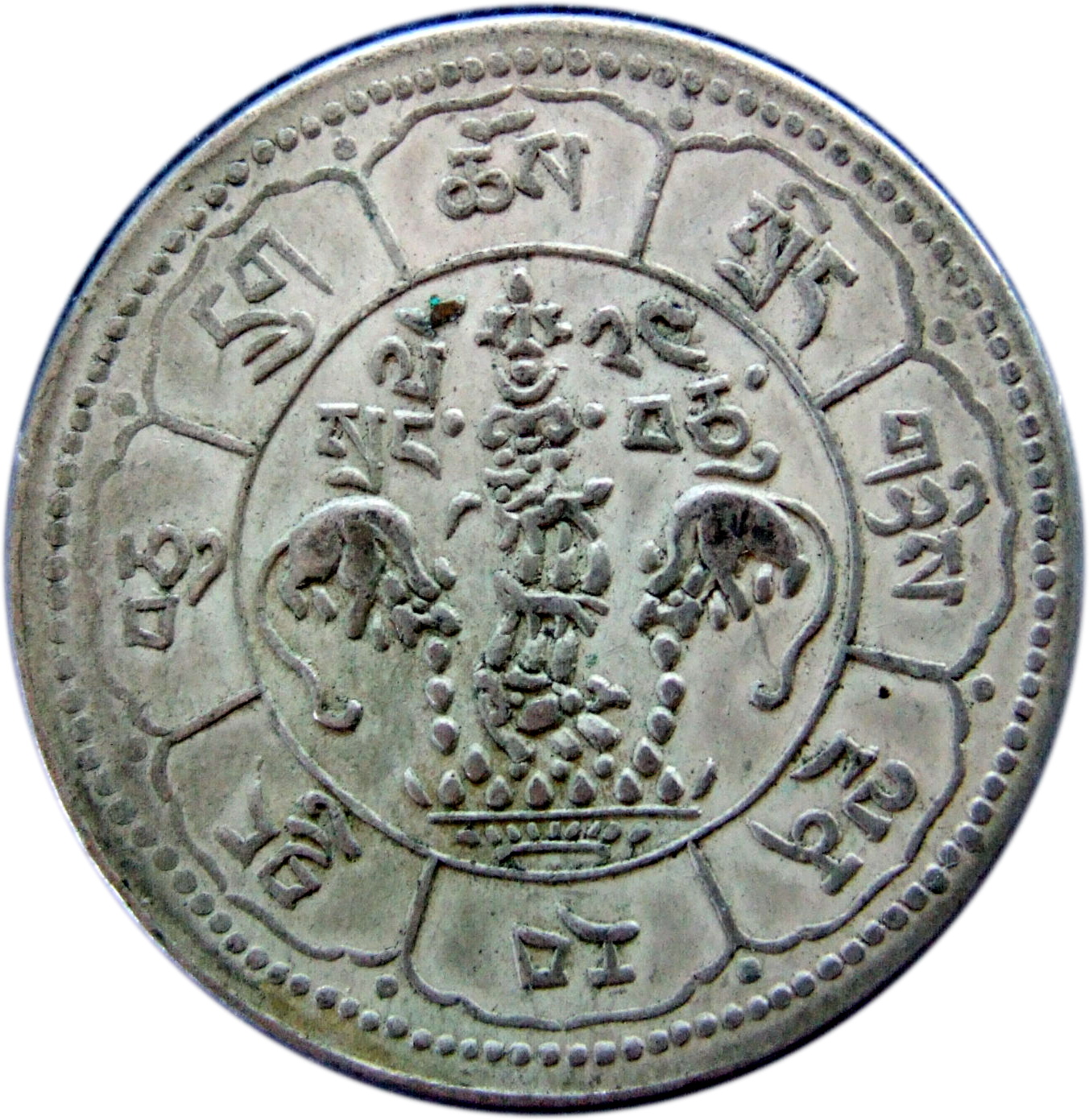
10 Srang billon coin, dated 16-24 ( = AD 1950), reverse

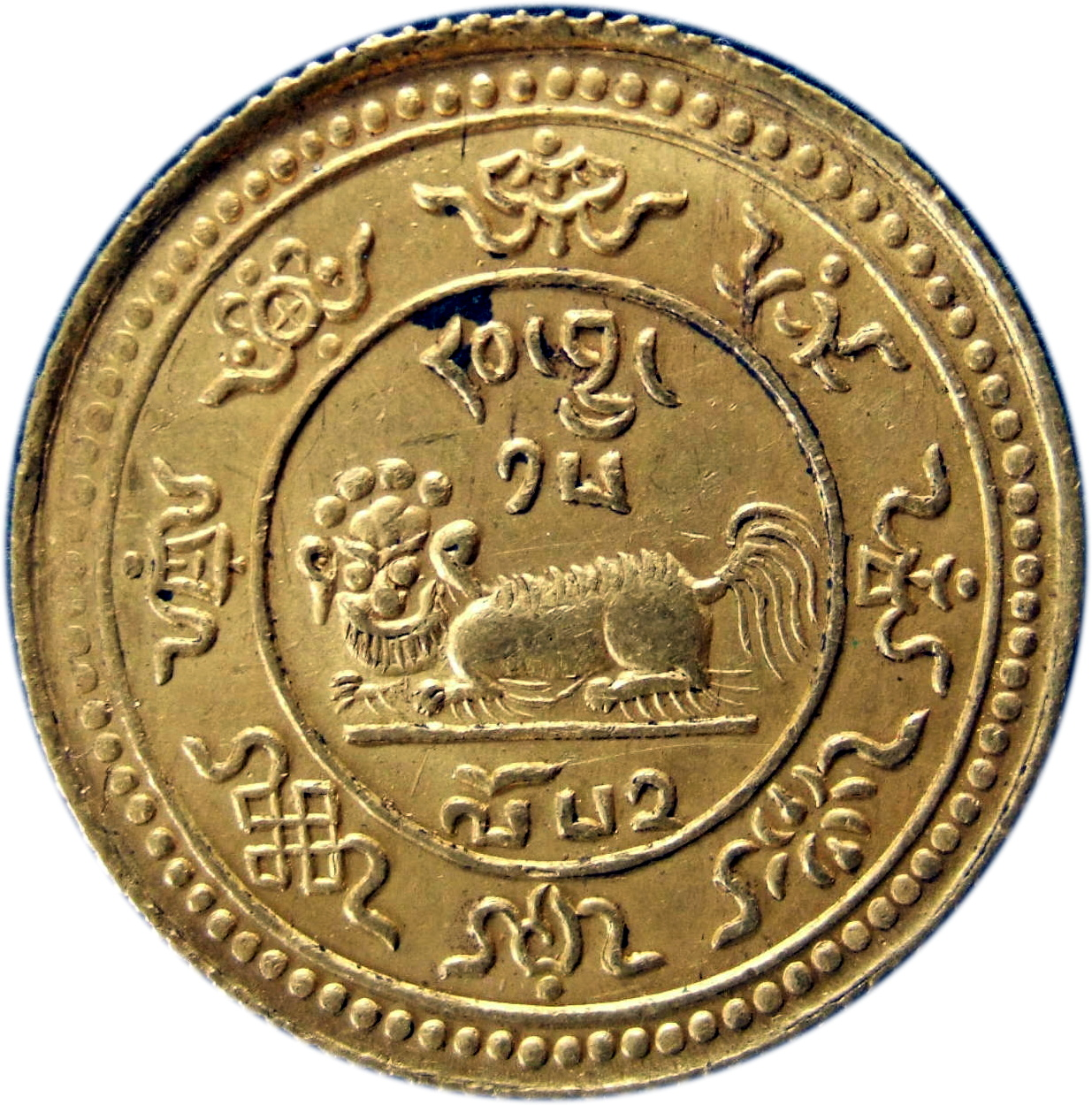
Tibetan 20 Srang gold coin dated 15-52 (= AD 1918), obverse

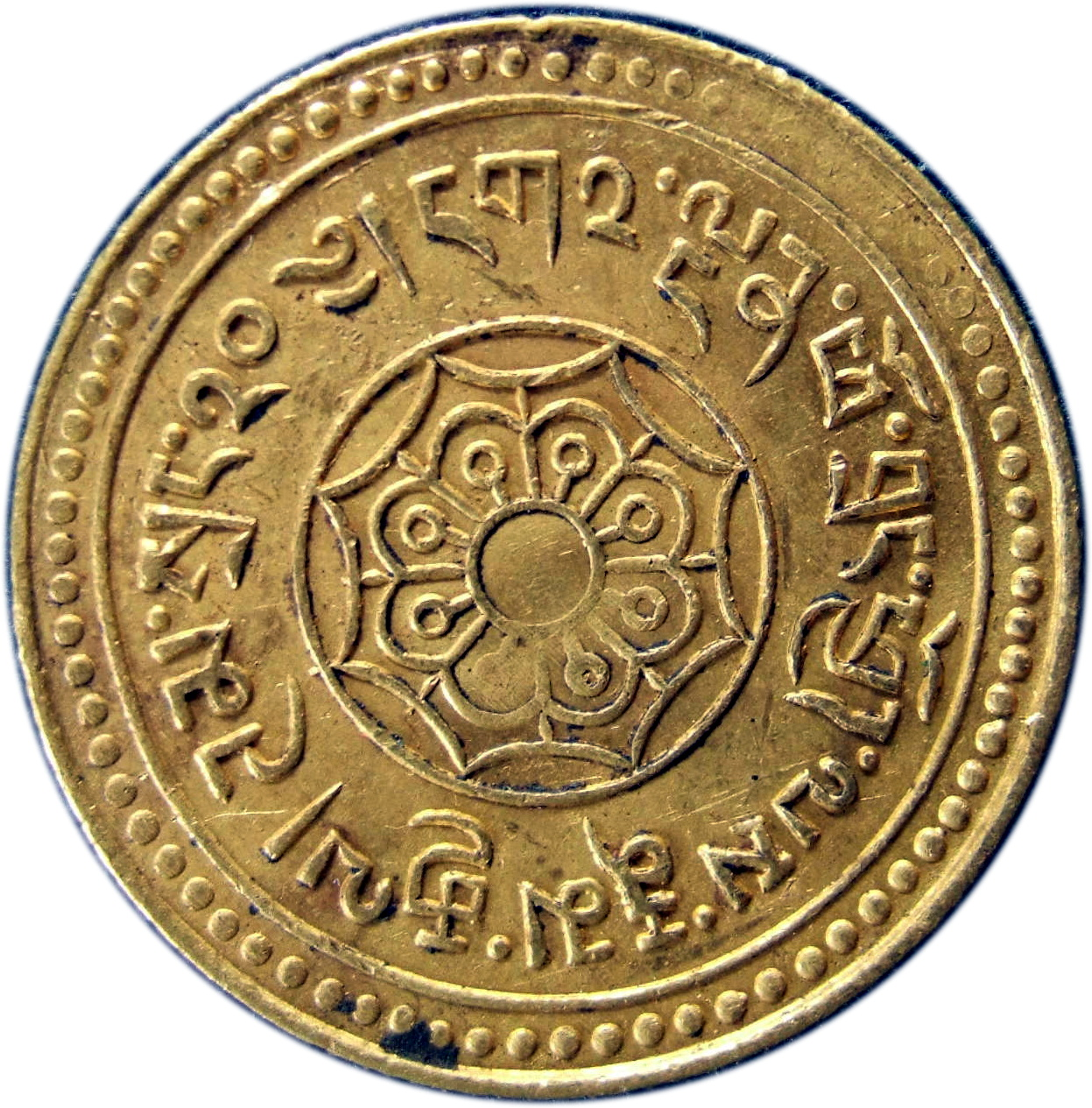
Tibetan 20 Srang gold coin dated 15-52 (= AD 1918), reverse

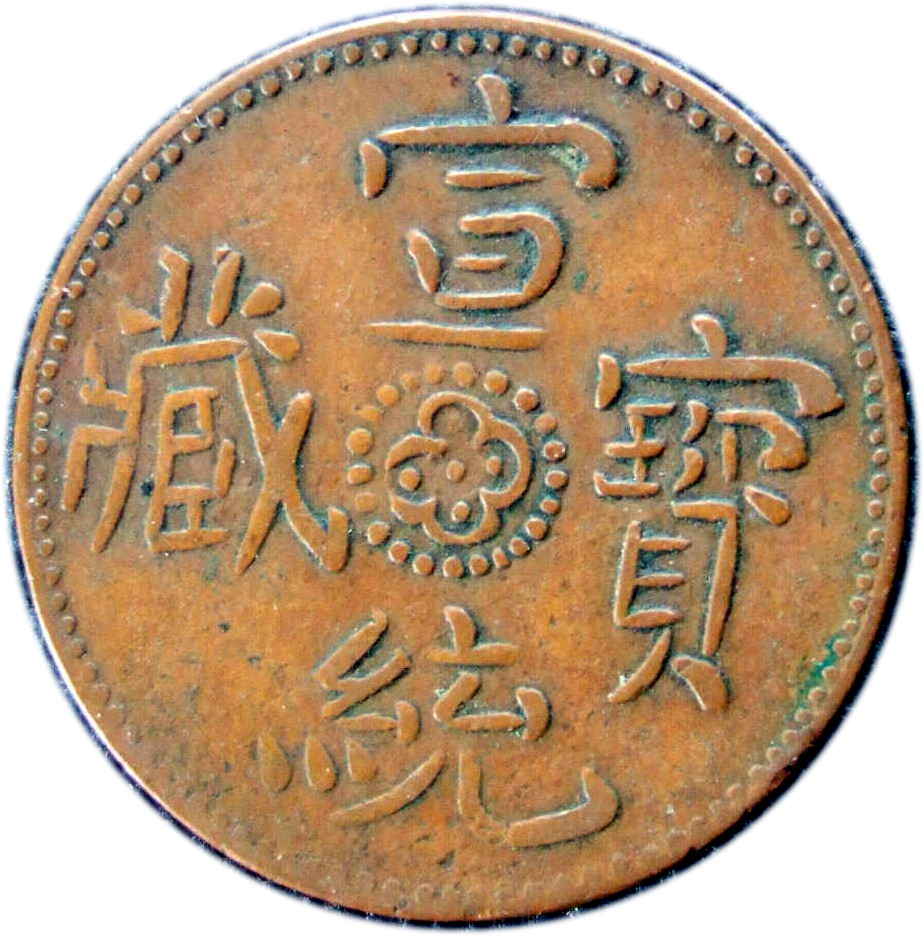
Half skar copper coin of the Xuan Tong era (AD 1910), obverse

== A selection of Tibetan coins ==
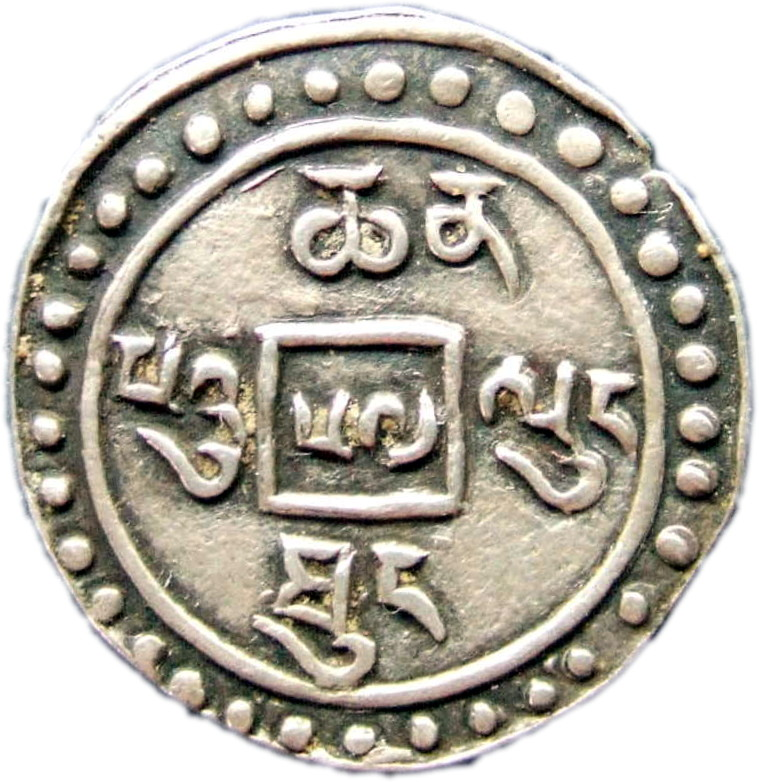
Sino-Tibetan half sho coin, dated year 57 of Qianlong era, obverse. This is a pattern coin which was not approved by the Imperial authorities of China, since it has inscriptions in Tibetan on both sides. In the following year 58 (AD 1793) the regular issue of Sino-Tibetan coins was started with coins which had a Chinese legend on obverse and a Tibetan legend on reverse.

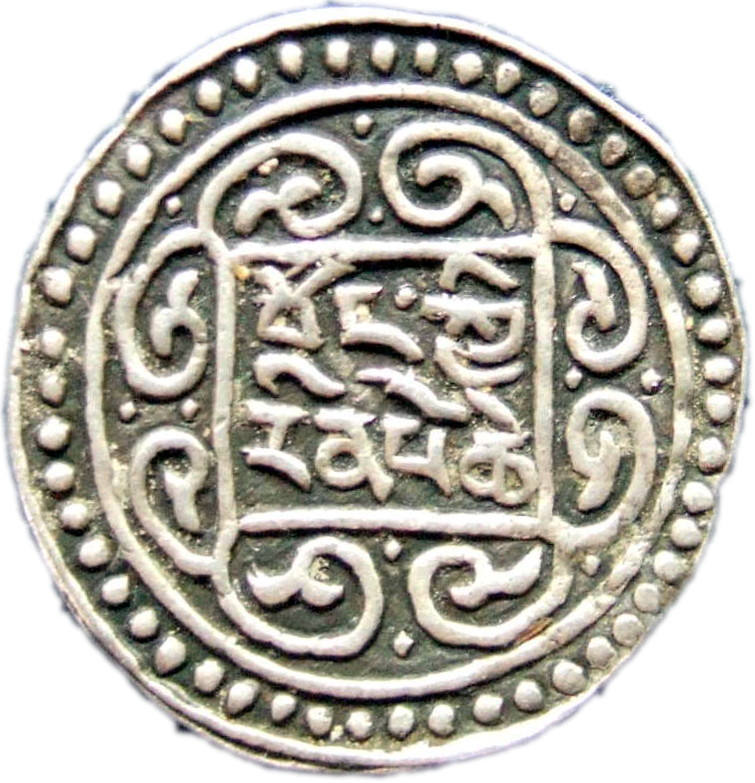
Sino-Tibetan half sho coin, dated year 57 of Qianlong era. Reverse. The inscription is bod kyi rin po che ("Tibetan precious [coin]")

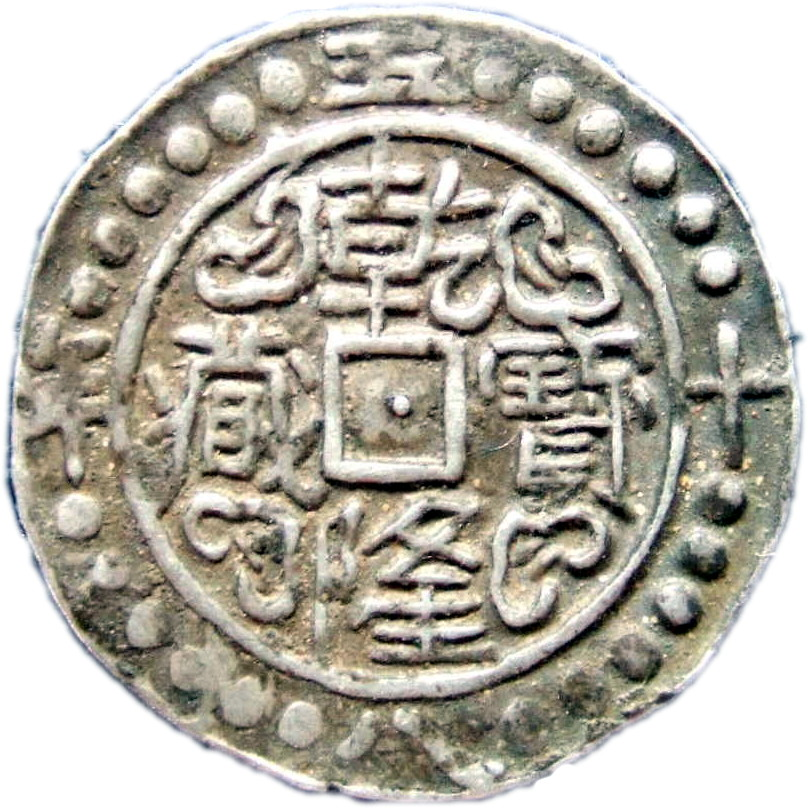
Sino-Tibetan half sho coin, dated year 58 of Qianlong era. Obverse. The Chinese inscription is qianlong bao tsang ("Tibet money of Qianlong")

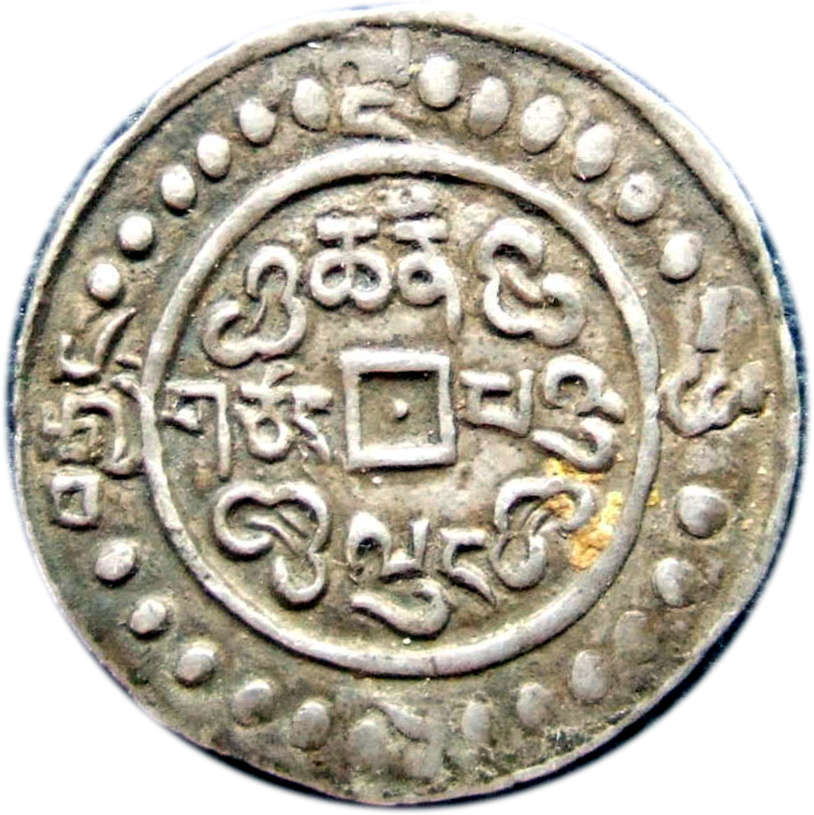
Sino-Tibetan half sho coin, dated year 58 of Qianlong era. Reverse

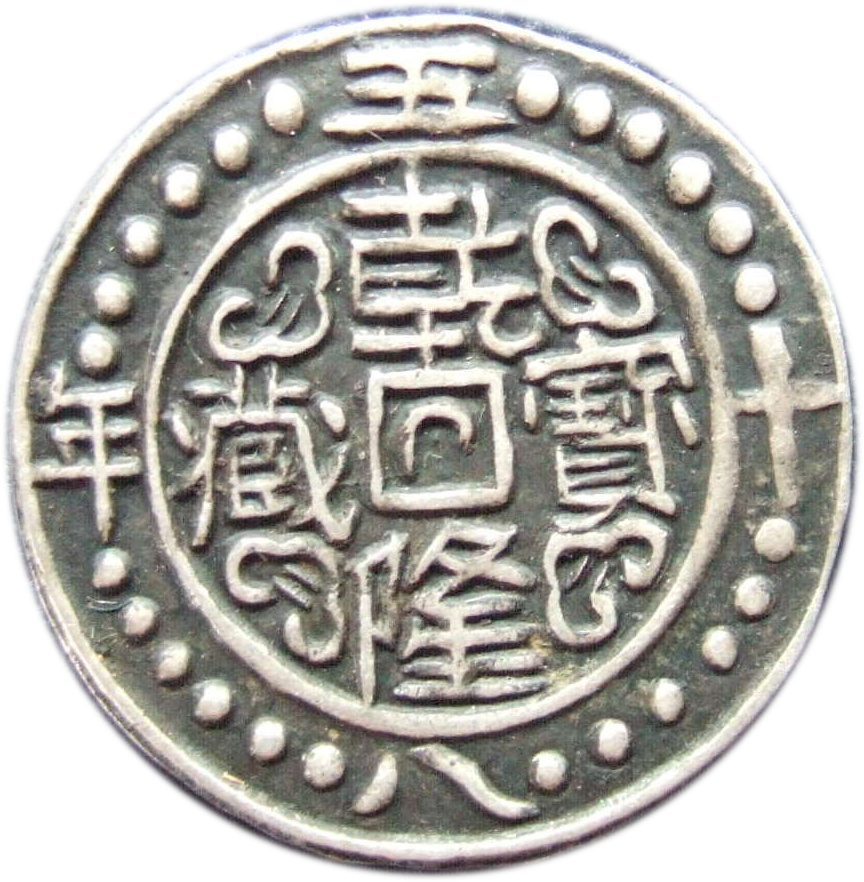
Sino-Tibetan half tangka coin, dated year 58 of Qianlong era. Obverse

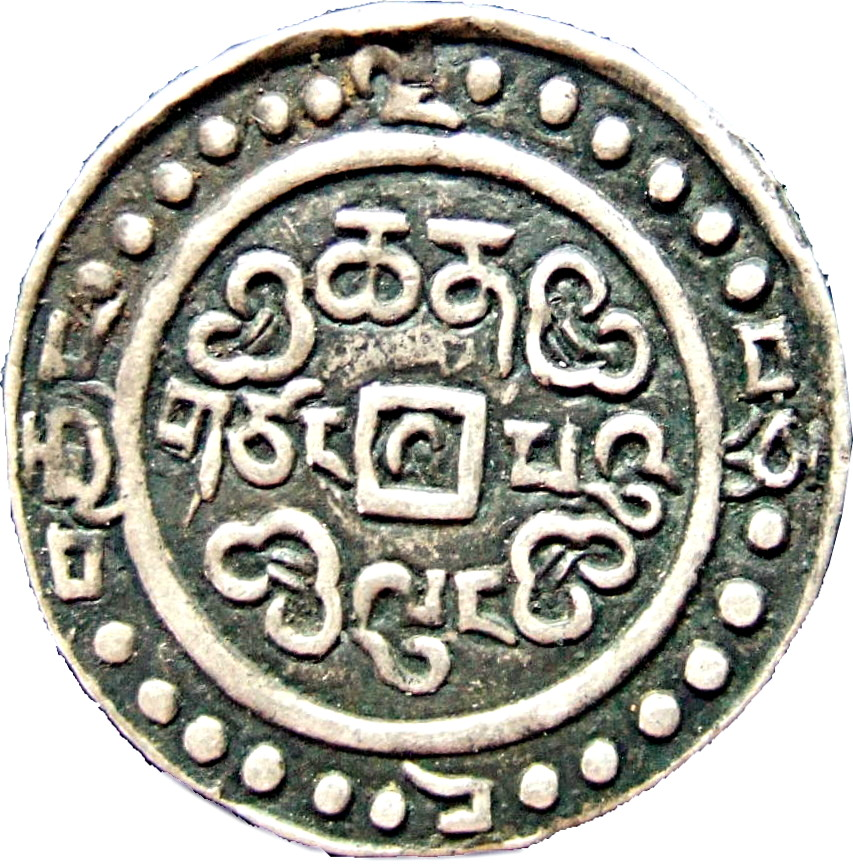
Sino-Tibetan half tangka coin, dated year 58 of Qianlong era. Reverse

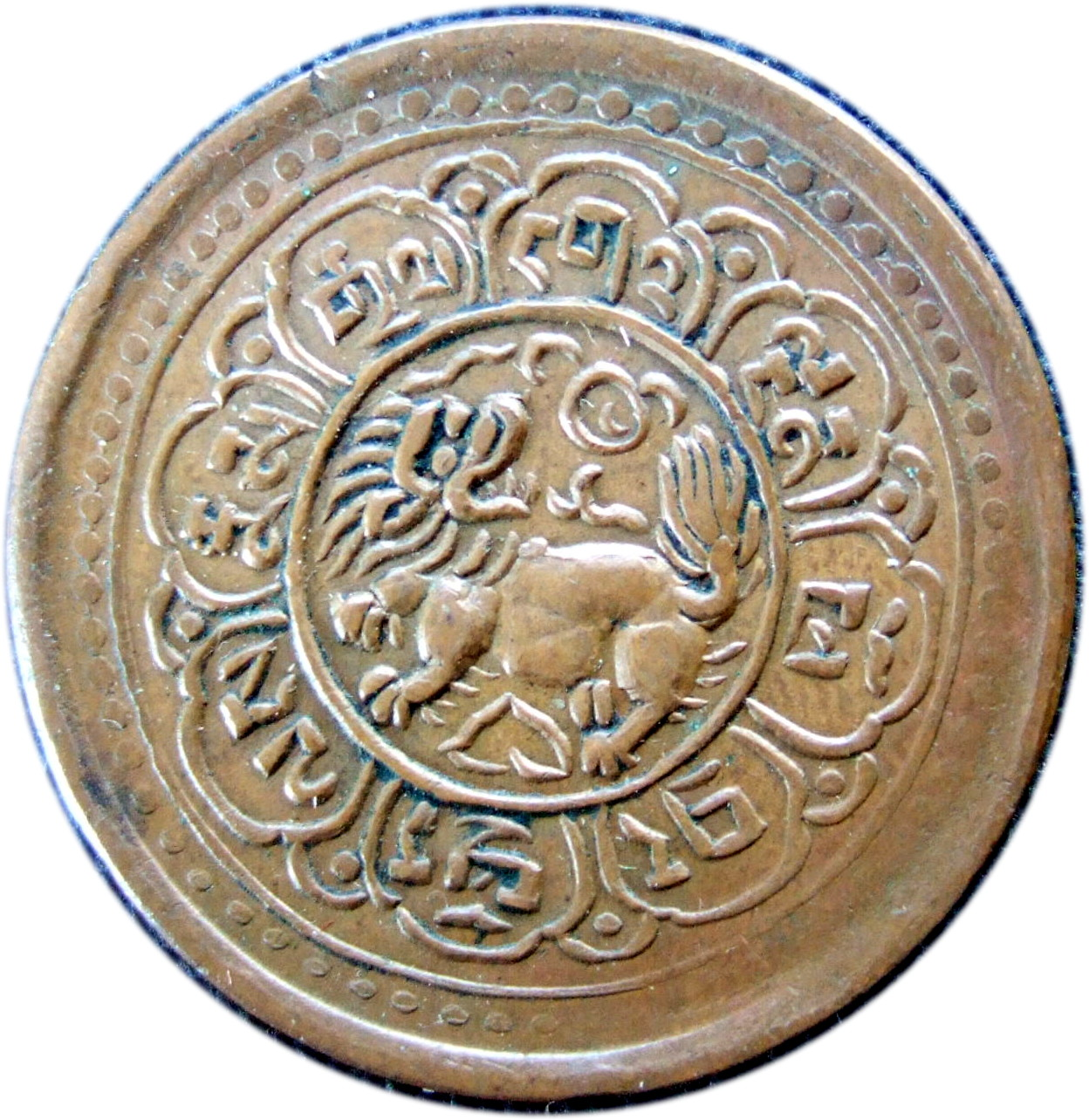
7 and half skar copper coin, dated 15-43 ( = AD 1909), obverse.

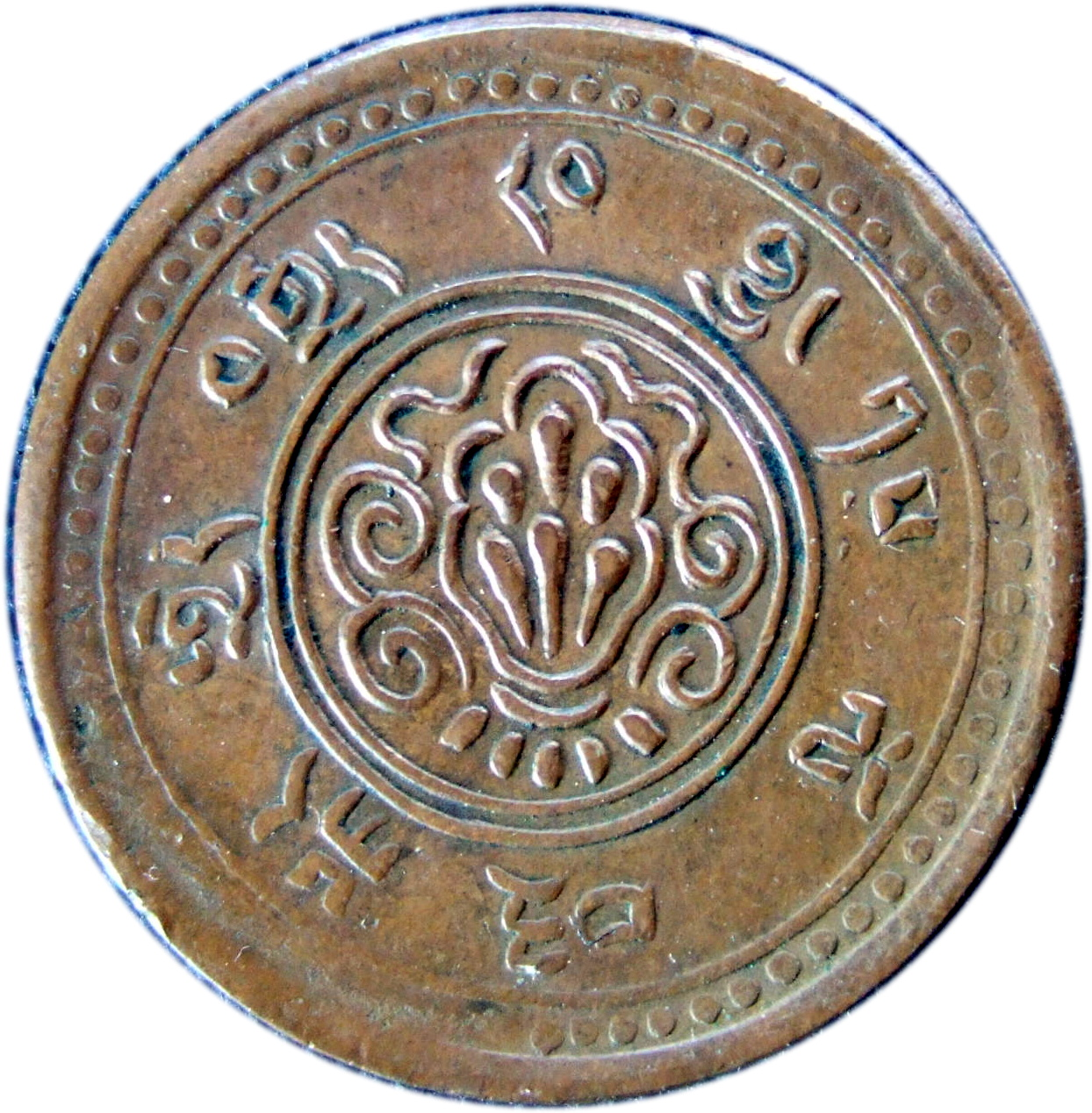
7 and half skar copper coin, dated 15-43 ( = AD 1909), reverse.

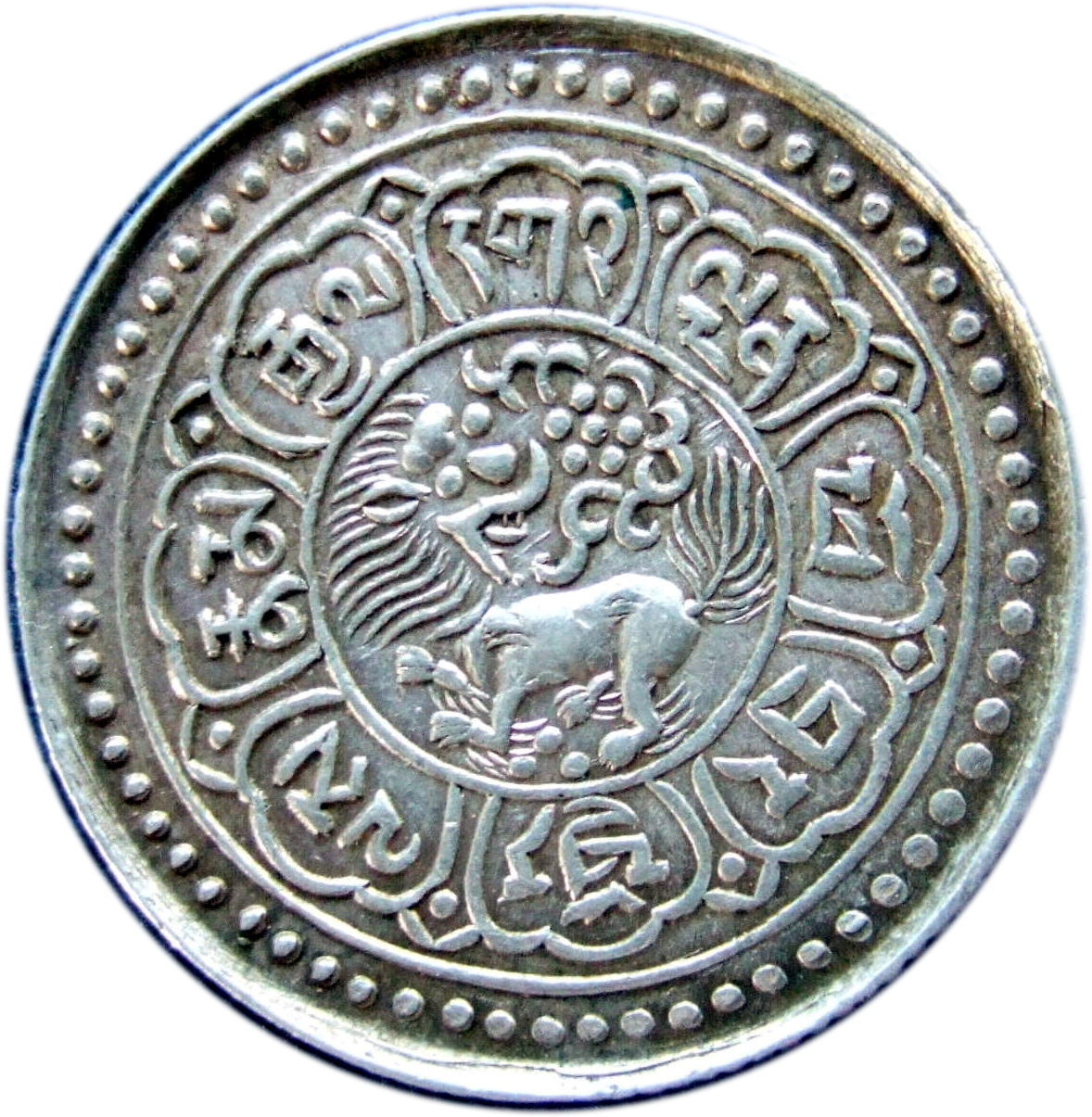
5 sho silver coin, dated 15-52 ( = AD 1918), obverse.

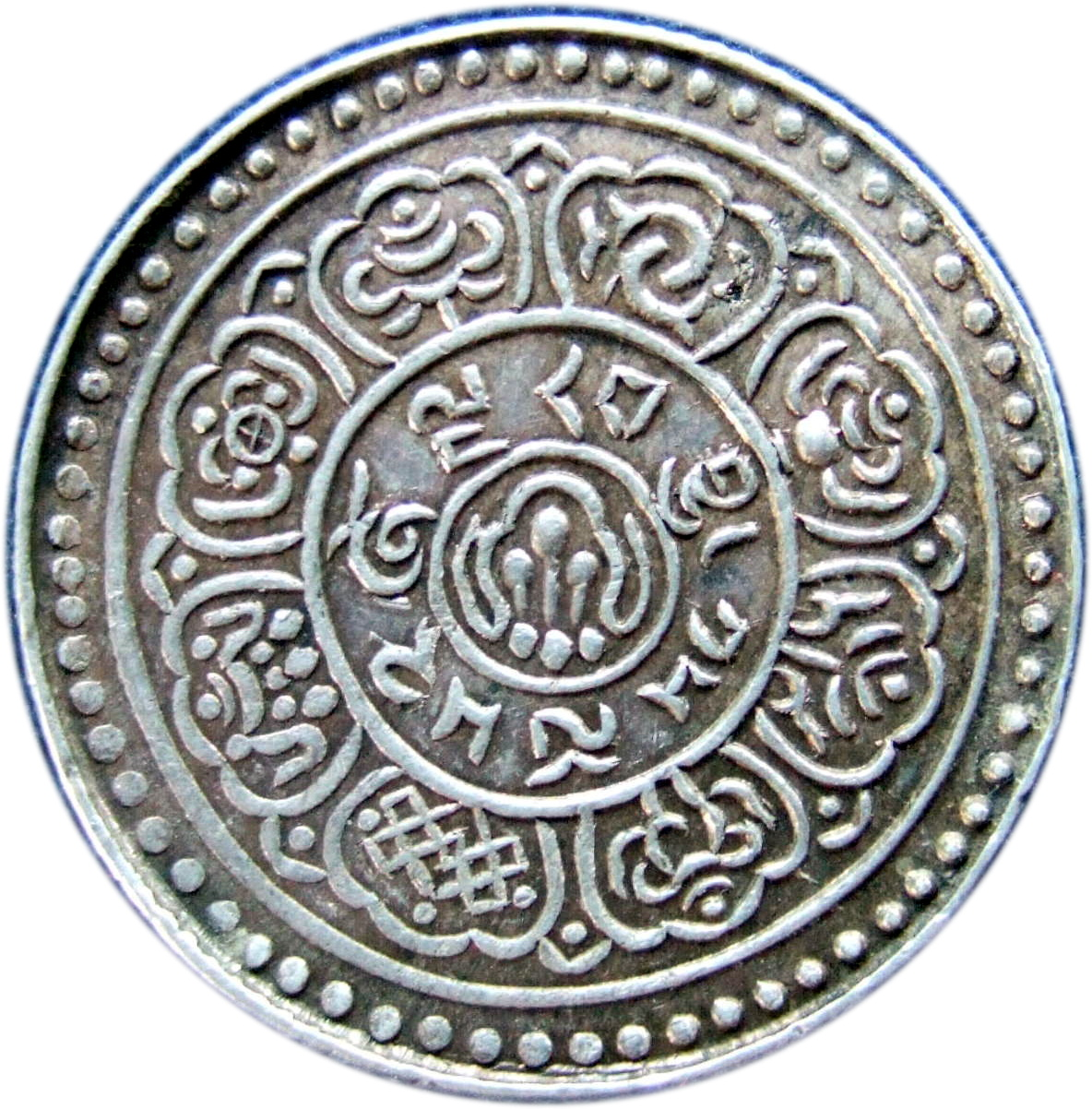
5 sho silver coin, dated 15-52 ( = AD 1918), reverse.

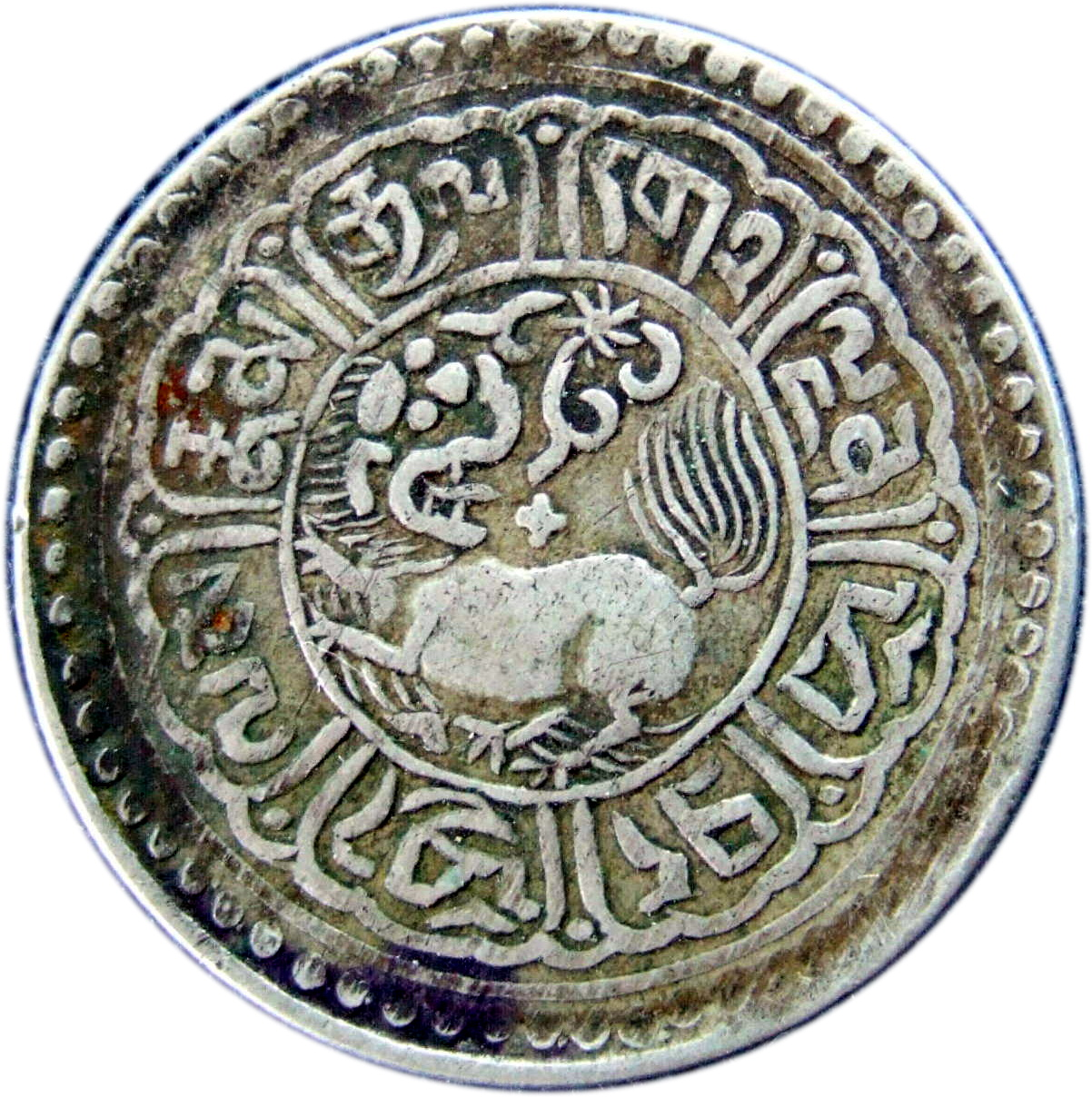
5 sho silver coin, dated 15-56 ( = AD 1924), obverse.

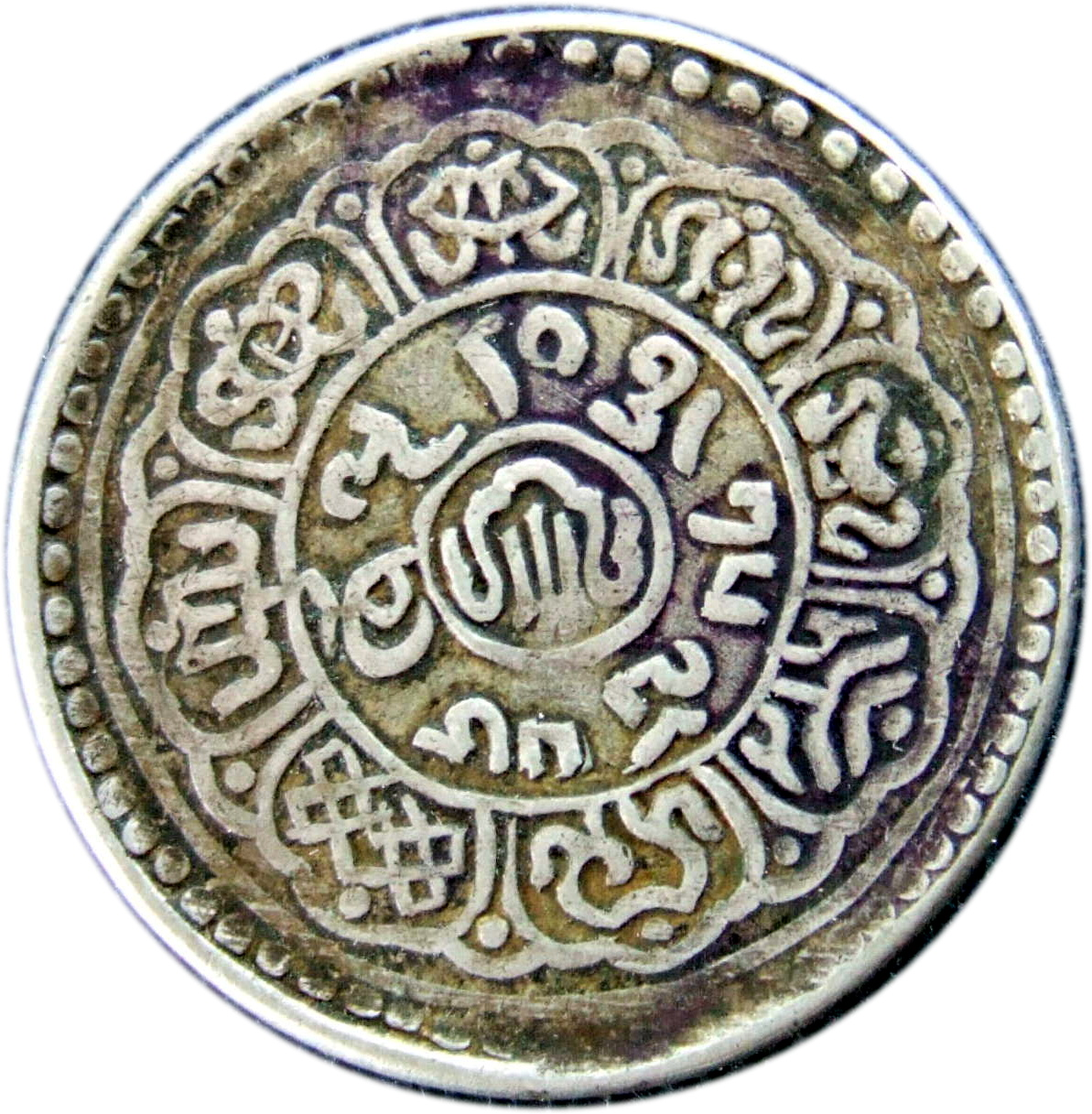
5 sho silver coin, dated 15-56 ( = AD 1924), reverse.

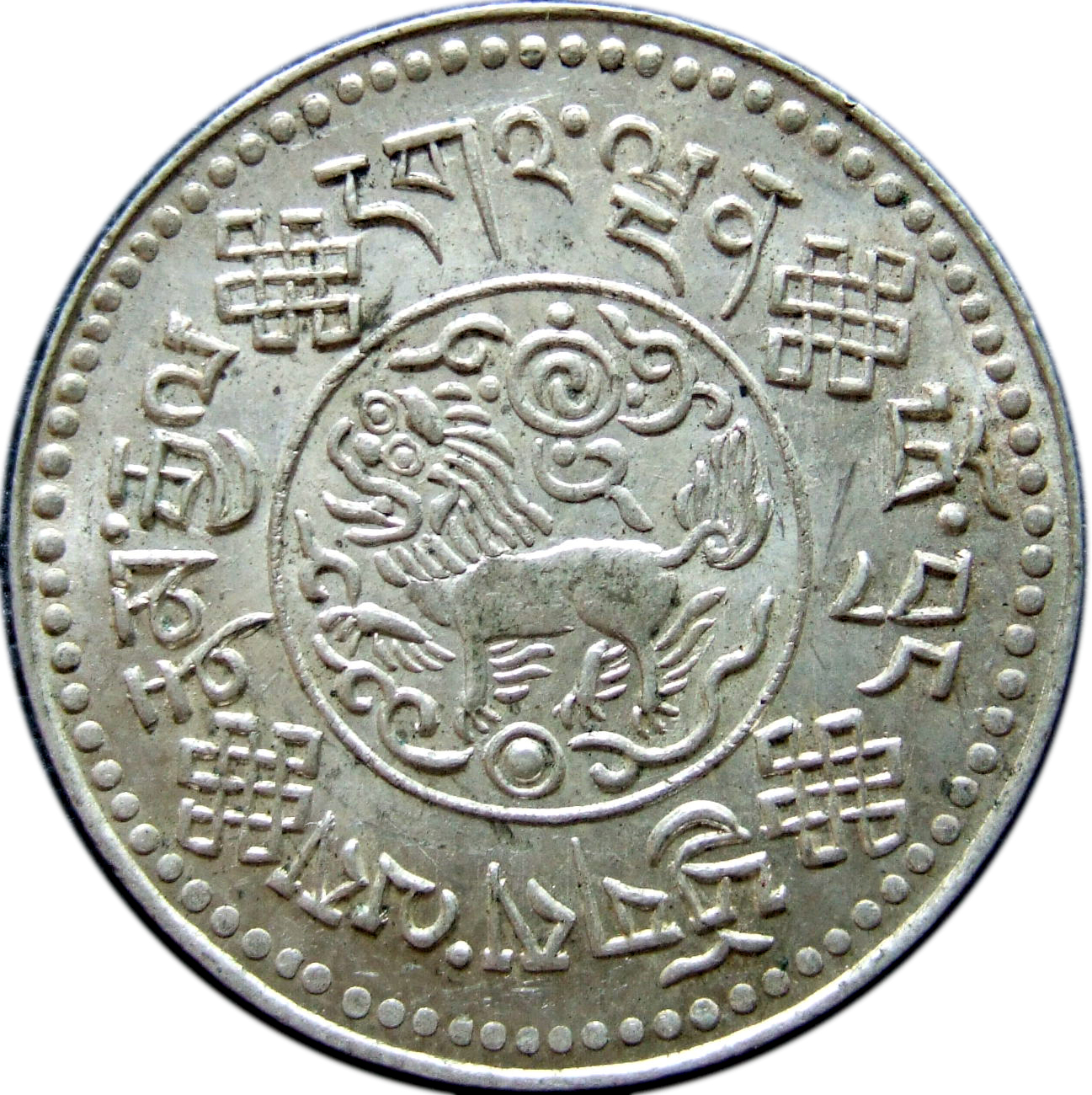
3 Srang silver coin, dated 16-8 ( = AD 1934), obverse.

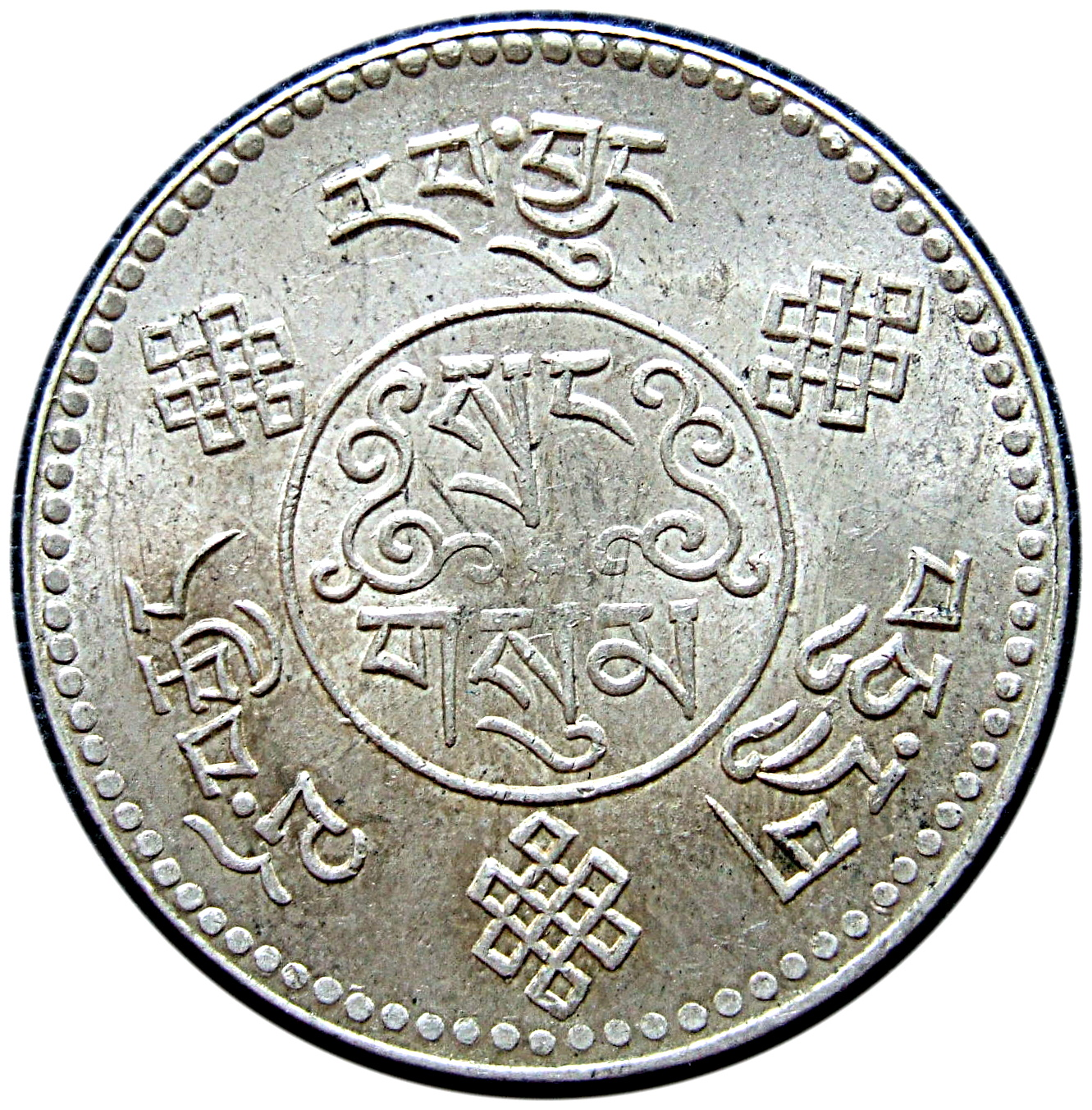
3 Srang silver coin, dated 16-8 ( = AD 1934), reverse.

== See also ==
- Nepalese mohar
- Bhutanese ngultrum
- Tibetan skar
- Tibetan srang
- Tibetan tangka
