= Scarr (surname) =

Scarr can be a surname. Notable people with the surname include:

- Dan Scarr (born 1994), English footballer
- Dee Scarr, environmentalist and scuba diver from Bonaire
- Elizabeth Scarr, Australian scientist
- Henry Scarr, English shipbuilder (and namesake company)
- Josephine Scarr (born 1936), English-born Australian archaeologist, mountaineer and author
- Kelli Scarr, American singer and songwriter
- Max Scarr (born 1991), English cricketer
- Sandra Scarr (1936–2021), American psychologist and writer

== See also ==
- Scar (disambiguation)
- Skar (disambiguation)
