= SCAR =

SCAR may refer to:

- FN SCAR (Special Operations Forces Combat Assault Rifle)
- SCAR, ICAO airport code for Chacalluta International Airport in Arica, Chile
- SCAR, used by some athletic sports networks to refer to the South Carolina Gamecocks
- Scientific Committee on Antarctic Research, part of the International Council for Science (ICSU)
- Southern Campaigns of the American Revolution, generated around 80,000 pension applications from soldiers who participated
- Squadra Corse Alfa Romeo, European name of the video game Alfa Romeo Racing Italiano
- Sub-Caliber Aircraft Rocket, a U.S. Navy training rocket
- Supercheap Auto Racing, sponsor for several Australian-based racing teams

== See also ==
- Scar (disambiguation)
- Scarred (disambiguation)
- SCARS (disambiguation)
