= Skar =

Skar or Skår may refer to:

== Surnames ==
- Alfred B. Skar (1896–1969), Norwegian journalist and politician
- Hugo Mikal Skår (born 1978), Norwegian actor
- Johannes Skar (1837–1914), Norwegian educator and folklorist
- Julian Skar (born 1981), Norwegian composer and multi-media artist
- Øystein Skar (born 1985), Norwegian pianist and composer
- Rolf Skår (1941–2023), Norwegian engineer
- Reidar Skår (born 1964), Norwegian musician, composer and music producer
- Sindre Bjørnestad Skar (born 1992) Norwegian cross-country skier

== Other uses ==
- Tibetan skar, historic unit of currency
- General Skarr, a character from Evil Con Carne
- El Edén International Airport (ICAO airport code SKAR), airport in Armenia, Colombia
- SKAR, a fictional organization in the G.I. Joe Extreme toy series
- Skår (district), in Örgryte, Sweden
- Skar King, a fictional character who resembles a colossal orangutan-like Kaiju and serves as the tyrannical antagonist of the 2024 film Godzilla x Kong: The New Empire

== See also ==
- Scarr, a surname
- Skaar (disambiguation)
- Scar (disambiguation)
