= Sub-caliber training =

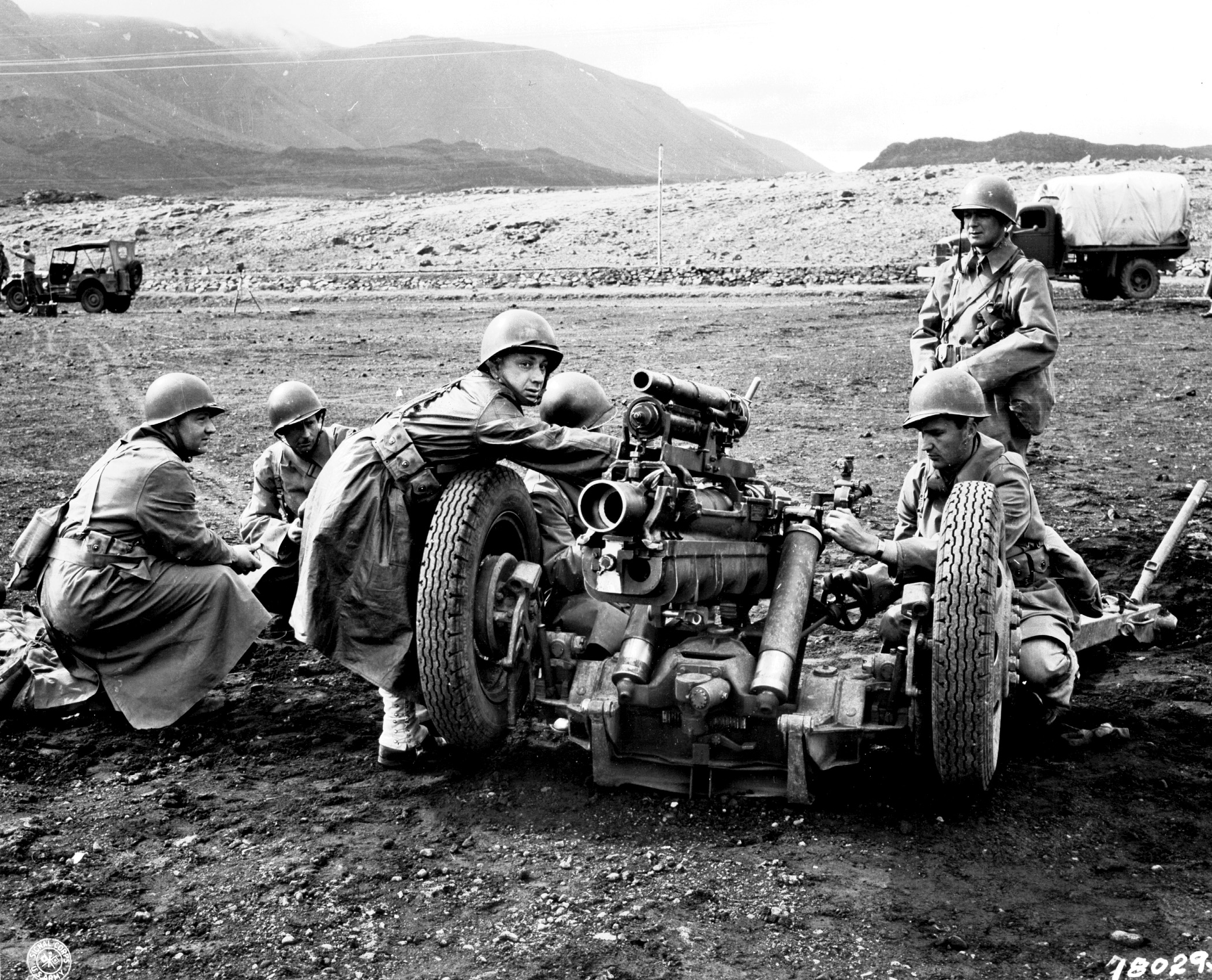
Gun crew prepares to fire a 37 mm M1916 sub-caliber mounted on a M116 howitzer during range practice in Iceland, 1943

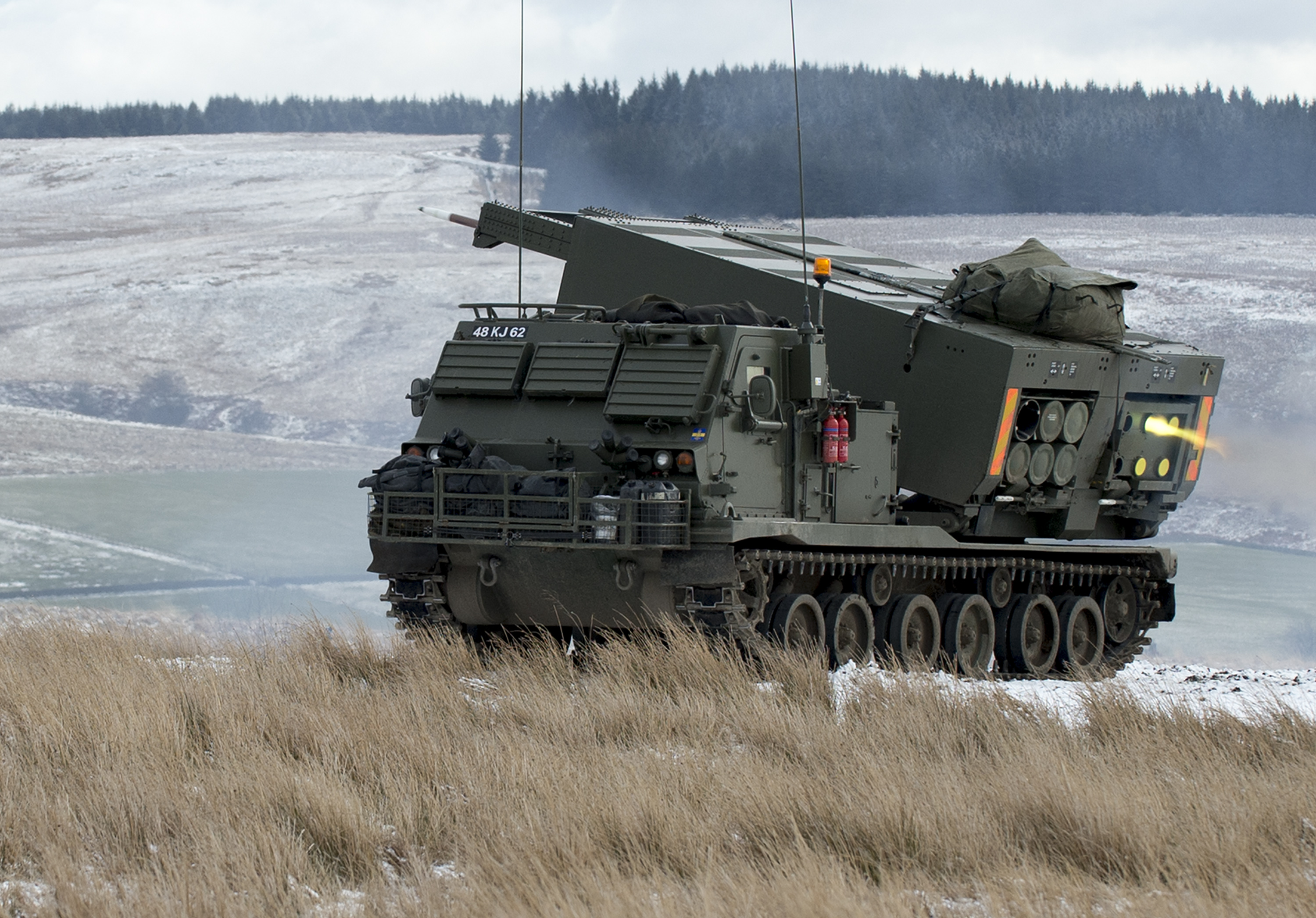
British M270 MLRS (228 mm) firing 70-mm Reduced Range Practice Rockets L1A2, 2015

Sub-caliber training is used to save wear and expense when training with a larger gun by use of smaller weapons (sometimes, but not always, with very similar ballistic characteristics). The smaller weapons could be inserted into the larger weapon's barrel, externally attached to the barrel or mounted above the weapon.

Examples include 2.25-Inch Sub-Caliber Aircraft Rocket to train aircraft pilots to shoot aerial rockets that emerged during WWII, or the M303 Sub-Caliber insert for the 120 mm (4.7 in) M120 mortar that allows the mortar to use 81 mm (3.2 in) ammunition or the M49A1 sub-caliber device, which used 7.62×51mm NATO rifle rounds in the 90 mm (3.5 in) M67 recoilless rifle. These devices/weapons have been used for guns as large as the 12–16-inch (304.8–406.4 mm) main guns of battleships.

== See also ==
- Caliber conversion sleeve
- Spotting rifle
- Cadet trainer
- Glossary of firearms terms
- List of established military terms
- Military education and training
- Weapon effects simulation
- Range-finder painting
