= History of the taka =

History of a medieval Asian currency

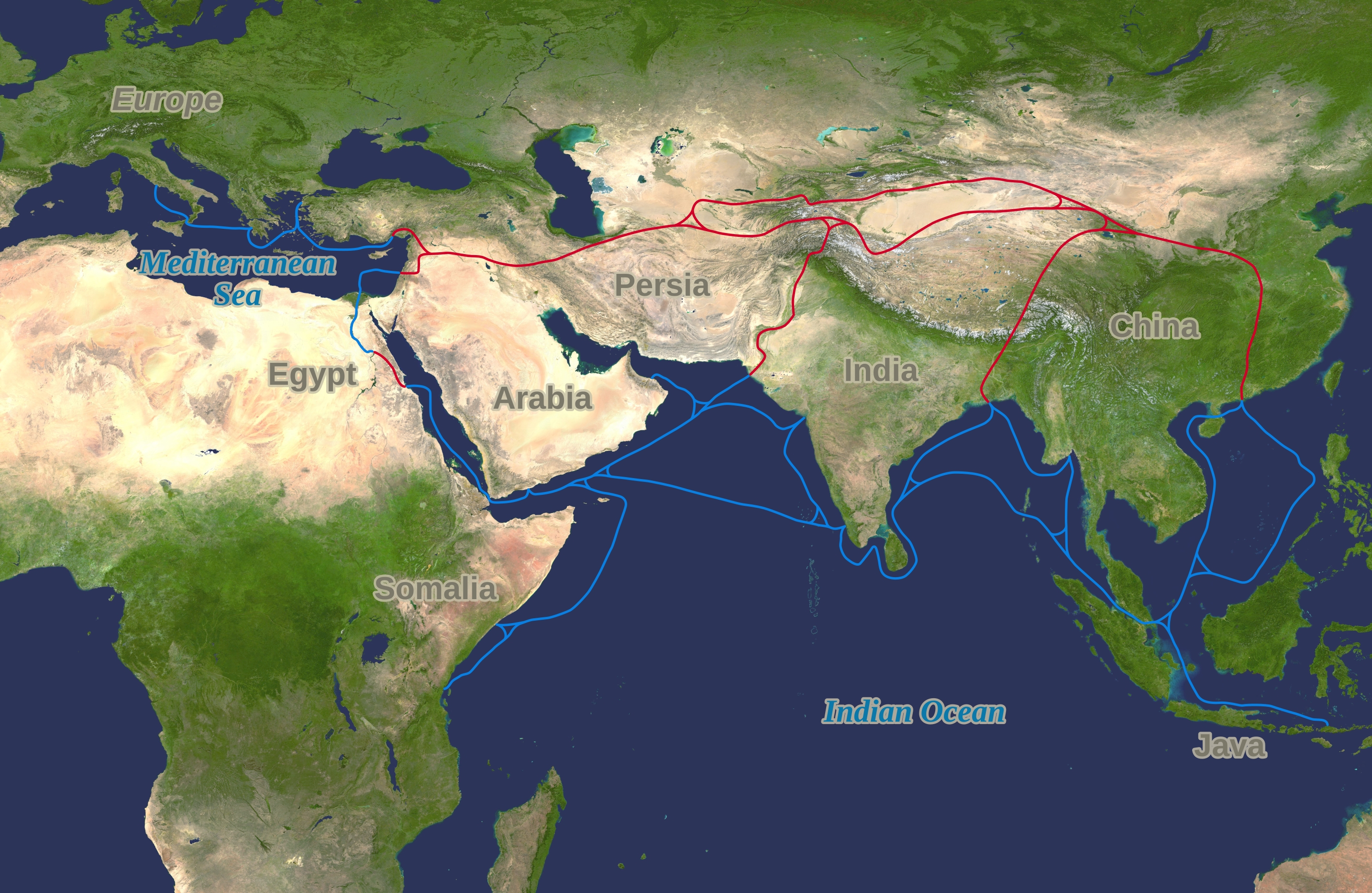
The taka was used on the Himalayan Silk Road, particularly between Tibet and Nepal

The taka, also known as the tanka or tangka or dangka, was one of the major historical currencies of Asia, particularly in the Indian subcontinent and Tibet. It was introduced in the 14th century and became a currency of the Silk Road. Its history is intertwined with the medieval Islamic history and culture of the Indian subcontinent.

In modern times, the Bangladeshi taka is considered a legacy of the historical taka because Bengal was the stronghold of the currency. It was inscribed in numerous languages across different regions, including in Sanskrit, Arabic, Persian, Hindustani, Bengali, Nepali, Tibetan and Mandarin.

== Etymology ==
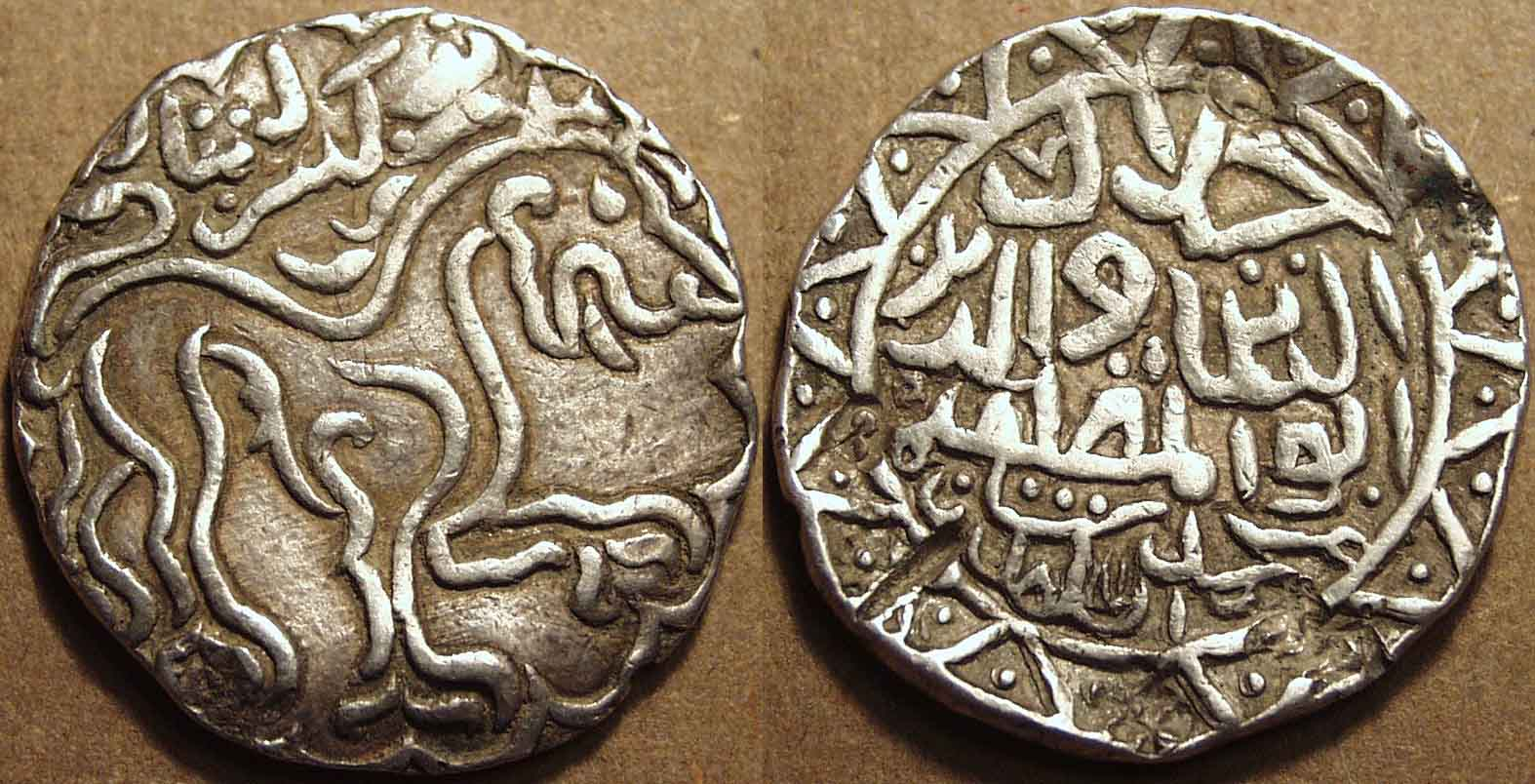
Silver tanka (taka) of Jalaluddin, Bengal Sultanate, portraying a lion, 15th century.

According to The American Heritage Dictionary of the English Language and Banglapedia, the word taka came from the Sanskrit word ṭaṅka, meaning silver coin, a Kulturwort of unclear origin, related to Turkic təñkə "coin, money", compare Bashkir təñkə, Tatar tanka, Uzbek tanga, Kazakh tenge, Russian denʹga.

The Russian word denga is borrowed from Tatar (cf. Chagatay: täŋkä; Kazakh: teŋgä; Mongolian: teŋge; lit. 'small silver coin'). Other proposals made are: Middle Persian: dāng, New Persian: dānag ('coin'), whereas other authors saw the word close to the Turkic word tamga ('mark, stamp').

== Arakan ==
The Bengal tanka was widely circulated in the Kingdom of Mrauk U (now in Myanmar) in the 16th and 17th centuries, when it was a vassal state of the Bengal Sultanate.

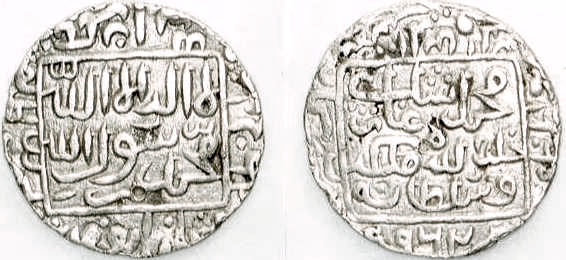
Silver tanka from Arakan with Arabic script

== Bangladesh ==
The Bangladeshi taka is the currency of modern Bangladesh. It was officially introduced in 1972 by the Bangladesh Bank to replace the Pakistani rupee at par following the end of the Bangladesh Liberation War and is produced by Bangladesh's Security Printing Corporation. The Bangladeshi taka carries the symbols ৳ and Tk.

== Bengal ==
The taka was traditionally equal to one silver rupee in Islamic Bengal. In 1338, Ibn Battuta noticed that the silver taka was the most popular currency in the region instead of the Islamic dinar. In 1415, members of Admiral Zheng He's entourage also noticed the dominance of the taka. The currency was the most important symbol of sovereignty for the Sultan of Bengal. The Sultanate of Bengal established at least 27 mints in provincial capitals across the kingdom.

The taka continued to be issued in Mughal Bengal, which inherited the sultanate's legacy. As Bengal became more prosperous and integrated into the world economy under Mughal rule, the taka replaced shell currency in rural areas and became the standardized legal tender. It was also used in commerce with the Dutch East India Company, the French East India Company, the Danish East India Company and the British East India Company.

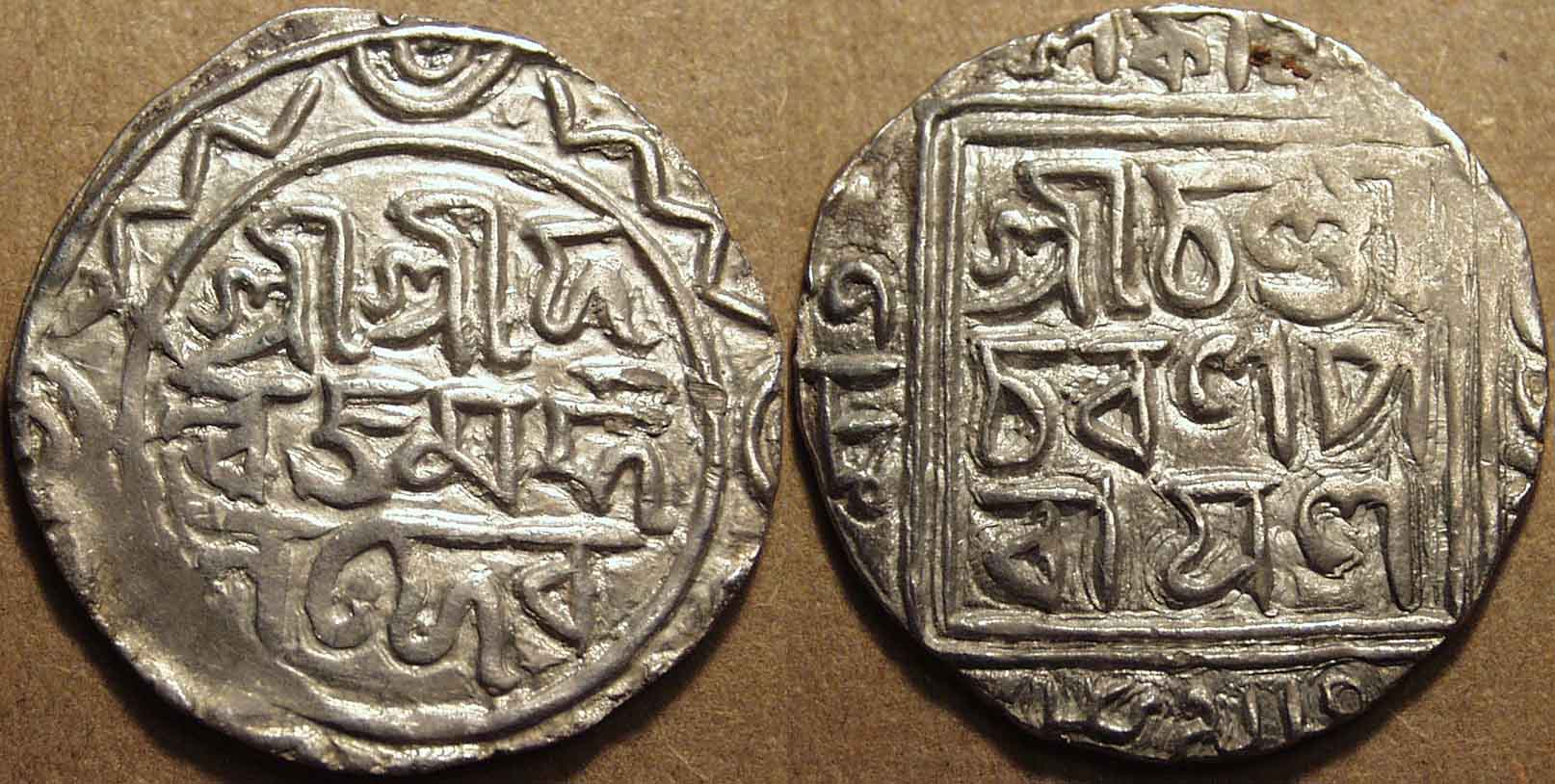
Silver taka of Raja Ganesha with Bengali script

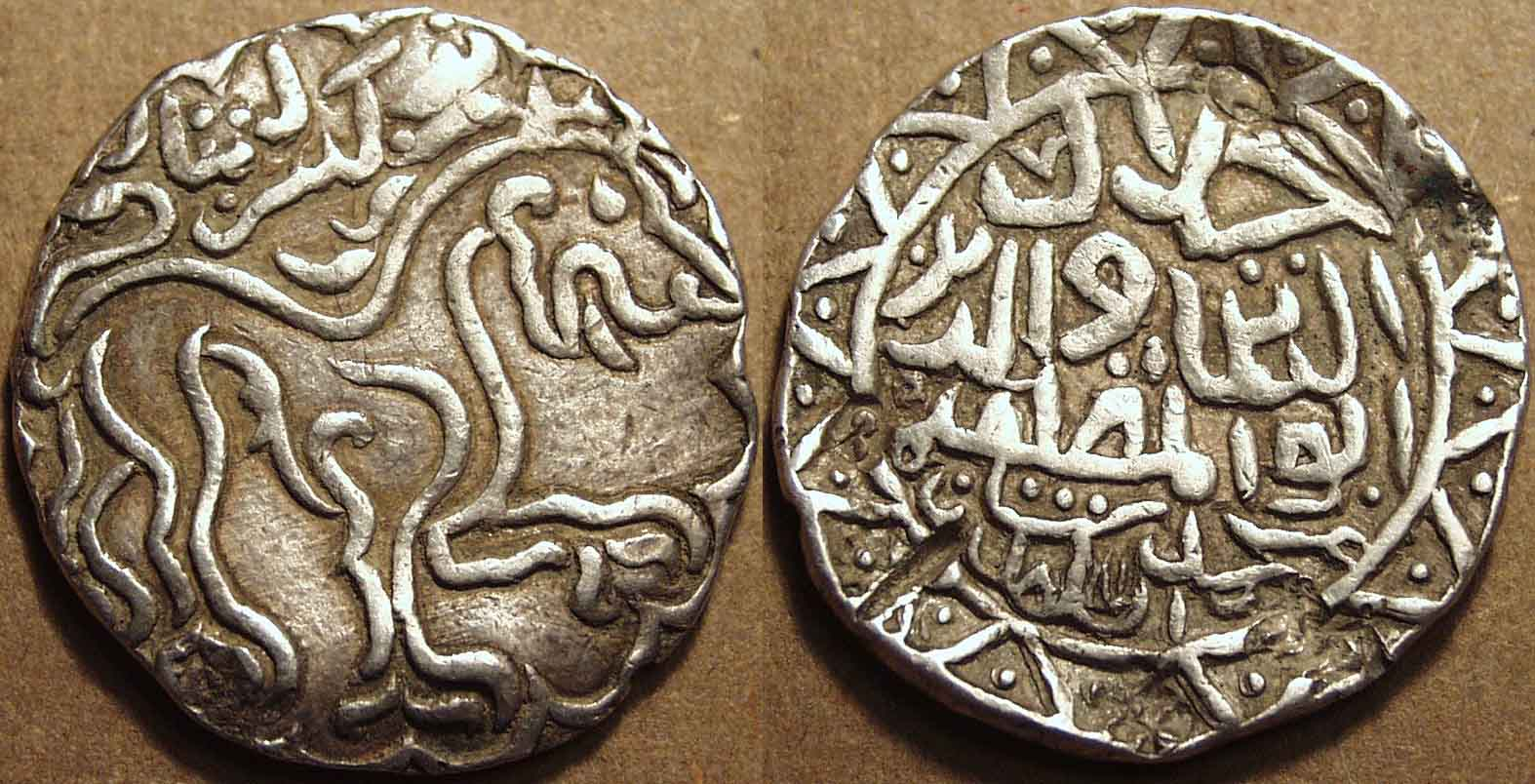
Silver taka of Jalaluddin Muhammad Shah with Arabic script and a lion symbol

== India ==
=== North India ===
Sultan Shams al-Din Iltutmish (r. 1210–1235) established the currency of the Delhi Sultanate drawing on Muslim settler and native Indian elements. The basic units were the silver tanka having the weight of one tola of 96 rattis (11.2 grams). The tanka was made up of 48 billon jitals containing 2 rattis of silver, mixed with copper, weighing about 3.5 grams in total. The silver tankas minted in Delhi bear the name of Caliph al-Muntasir and the titles of Iltutmish, typically al-sultān al-a'zam (the very mighty sultan), while the reverse either the shahada, lā ʾilāha ʾillā -llāh' muḥammadun rasūlu llāh ("There is no god but God. Muhammad is the Messenger of God") or the legend fī 'ahd al-imām (in the time of the Imam). Under the monetary reforms of Muhammad bin Tughluq, the tanka was modeled as representative money, a concept pioneered as paper money by the Mongols in China and Persia. Tughluq's tanka was minted in copper and brass. Its value was exchanged with gold and silver reserves in the imperial treasury. The currency was introduced due to the shortage of metals. Over time, the tanka was minted in silver. However, chaos followed its launch in the 14th century, leading to the collapse of the Tughluq dynasty. The Tughluqs were succeeded by numerous regional states, notably the Bengal Sultanate, the Bahmani Sultanate and the Gujarat Sultanate. These kingdoms continued to mint the new currency in the name of their own rulers. Even much later under the early modern Mughal Empire, regional currencies were still referred to as tanka/tangka/taka.

=== West India ===
In the 15th century, the Gujarat Sultanate, on the west coast of the Indian subcontinent, began to mint silver tanka. It was a symbol of sovereignty for the Muzaffarid dynasty of Gujarat.

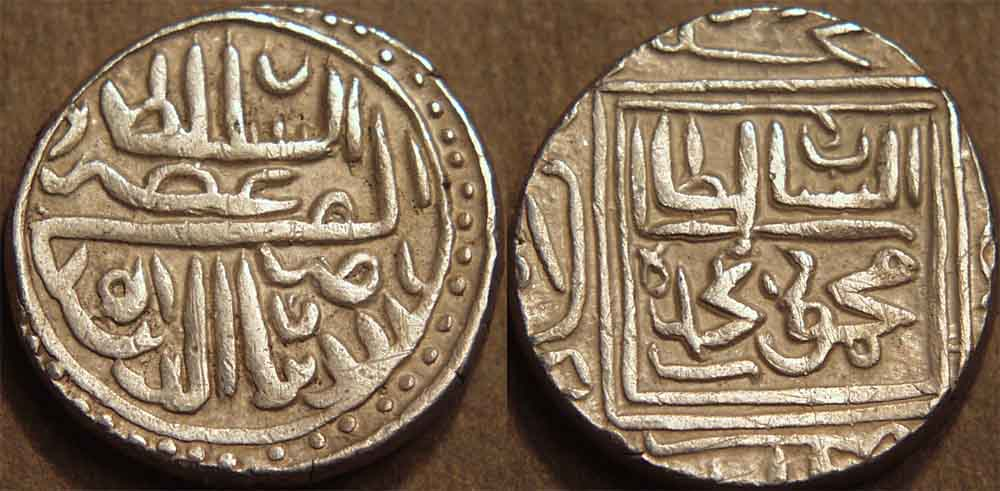
Silver tanka in Perso-Arabic script (Nasiruddin Mahmud Shah I reign)

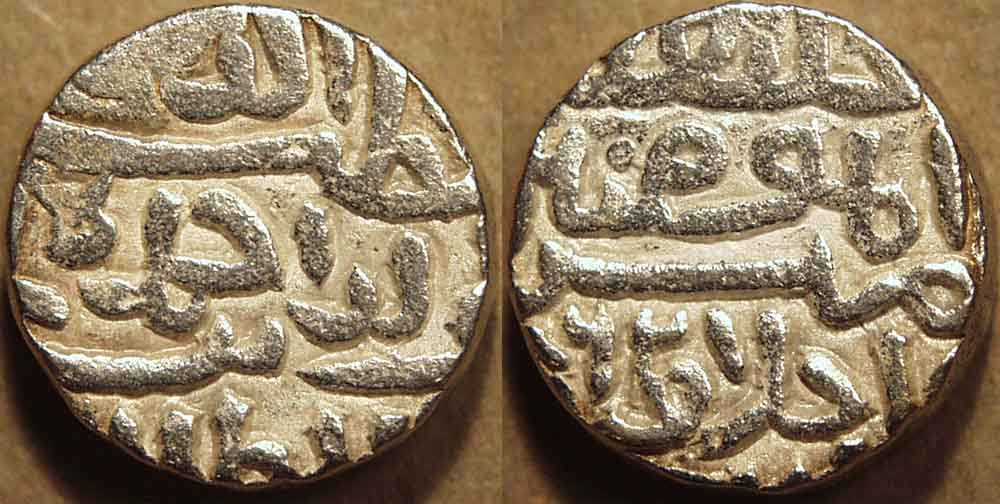
Silver tanka in Perso-Arabic script (Ahmad Shah reign)

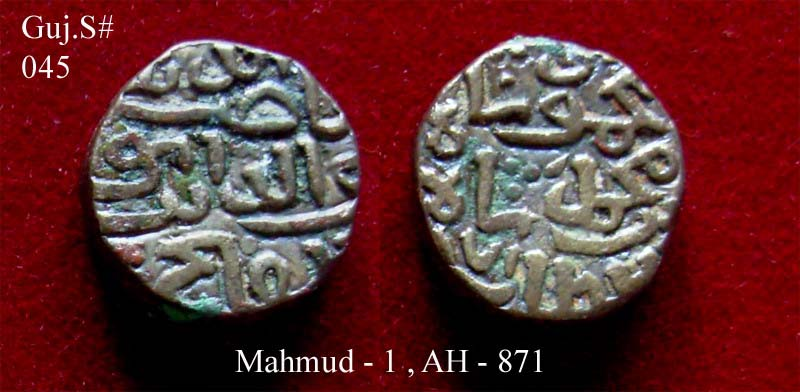
Early copper tanka

=== South India ===
The tanka was widely minted in the Deccan, including the Deccan sultanates and Mughal provinces. In the Berar Sultanate and Berar Subah, one Tanka-i-Barari was equal to eight Delhi tankas.

=== East India ===
In 14th-century Odisha, epigraphic records use terms such as vendi-tanka (alloyed silver) and sasukani-tanka (bullion). The tanka spread to the region from the Delhi Sultanate during the first half of 13th century. It remained in current use for a long time as is revealed by the epigraphs of Gangas and Survamshis.

=== Northeast India ===
Among Zomi communities in northeastern India, dangka continued to function as a general term for money and currency. The word is linguistically related to the wider South Asian family of monetary terms, including taka, tanka, tangka and tanga, which historically referred to silver coinage and circulated across the Indian subcontinent. Some Zomi historical traditions associate Dangka (Taka) with early Zomi history; however, there is currently insufficient archaeological or numismatic evidence to confirm the existence of an independently minted Zomi currency. Nevertheless, the continued use of dangka among Zomi communities in Manipur, Mizoram and Assam reflects the historical influence of regional trade and monetary exchange.

== Myanmar ==
Among the Zomi people of present-day Chin State, Myanmar, particularly speakers of the Zomi language, the term dangka refers to money, currency, coins or monetary value. Historical records from the Zomi area indicate that dangka functioned as a general monetary term rather than the name of a specific coin. In a study of the Kam Hau polity, Vumlallian (2009) recorded a market tax of one rupee (dangka) for each animal sold in the open market, demonstrating the term's use in taxation and local commerce. Zomi historical sources also identify dangka as a term applied to different currencies circulating in the region, including the Burmese kyat.

== Nepal ==
The tanka standard was introduced in the prosperous Himalayan Kathmandu Valley (Nepal proper) in the 16th century. It was modeled on the currency of Delhi, Bengal and the Mughal Empire. The Nepalese tanka was a debased silver coin struck in 10 g. weight with minor denominations of 1/4, 1/32, 1/123, 1/512. It was introduced by King Indra Simha.

== Pakistan ==
Until 1971, the present-day Pakistani rupee had bilingual inscriptions in Urdu and Bengali, and was called both the rupee and taka. The Bengali language movement played a decisive role in ensuring the recognition of the taka in East Pakistan, modern day Bangladesh.

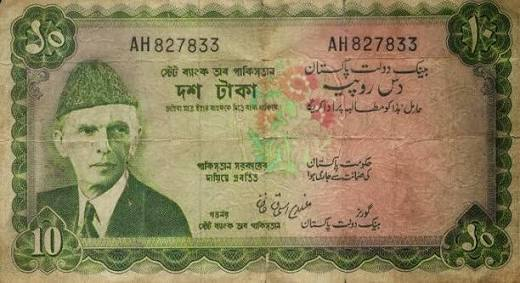
A Pakistani banknote with Bengali script denoting 10 taka

== Tibet ==
The Tibetan tangka was an official currency of Tibet for three centuries. It was introduced by Lhasa Newar merchants from Nepal in the 16th century. The merchants used Nepalese tanka on the Silk Road. The Tibetan government began to mint the tangka in the 18th century. The first Tibetan tangka was minted in 1763/64. China's Qing dynasty, Tibet's suzerain, established mints in the region in 1792. The Sino-Tibetan tangka carried Chinese language inscriptions.

Banknotes were issued between 1912 and 1941 in denominations of 5, 10, 15, 25 and 50 tangka.

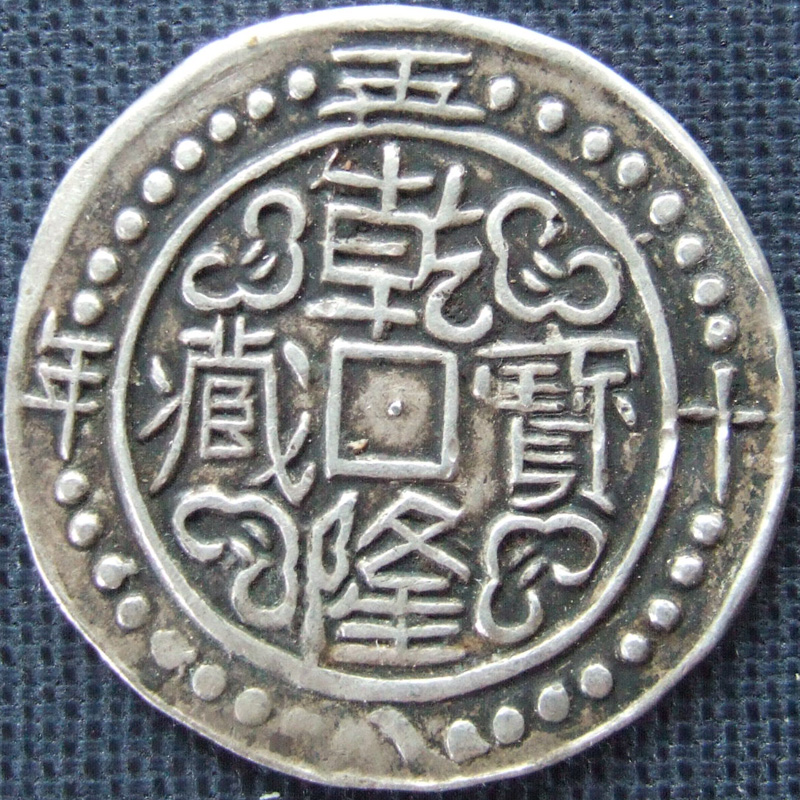
Tibetan tangka minted by the Qing dynasty

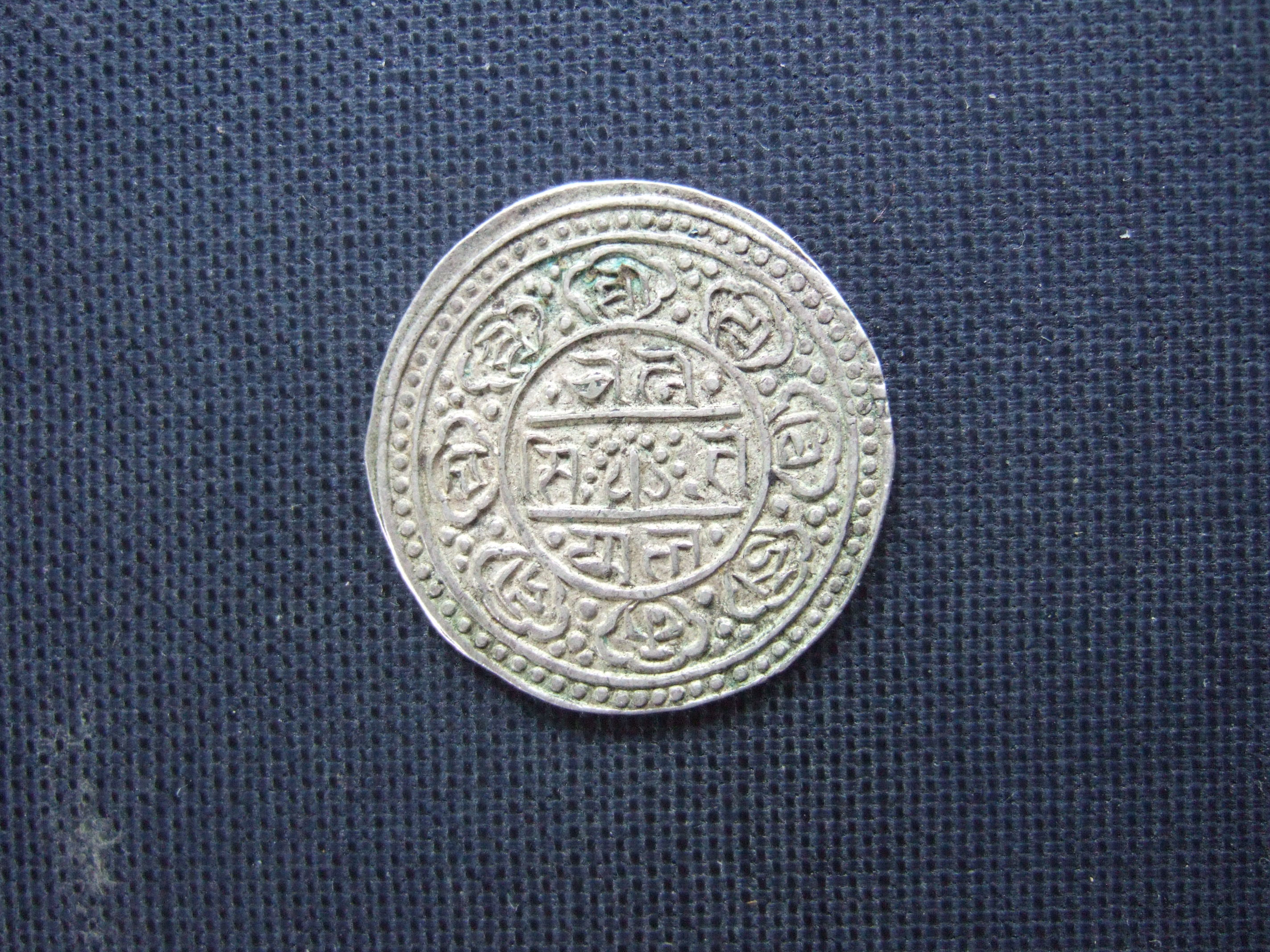
Tibetan tangka in Ranjana script

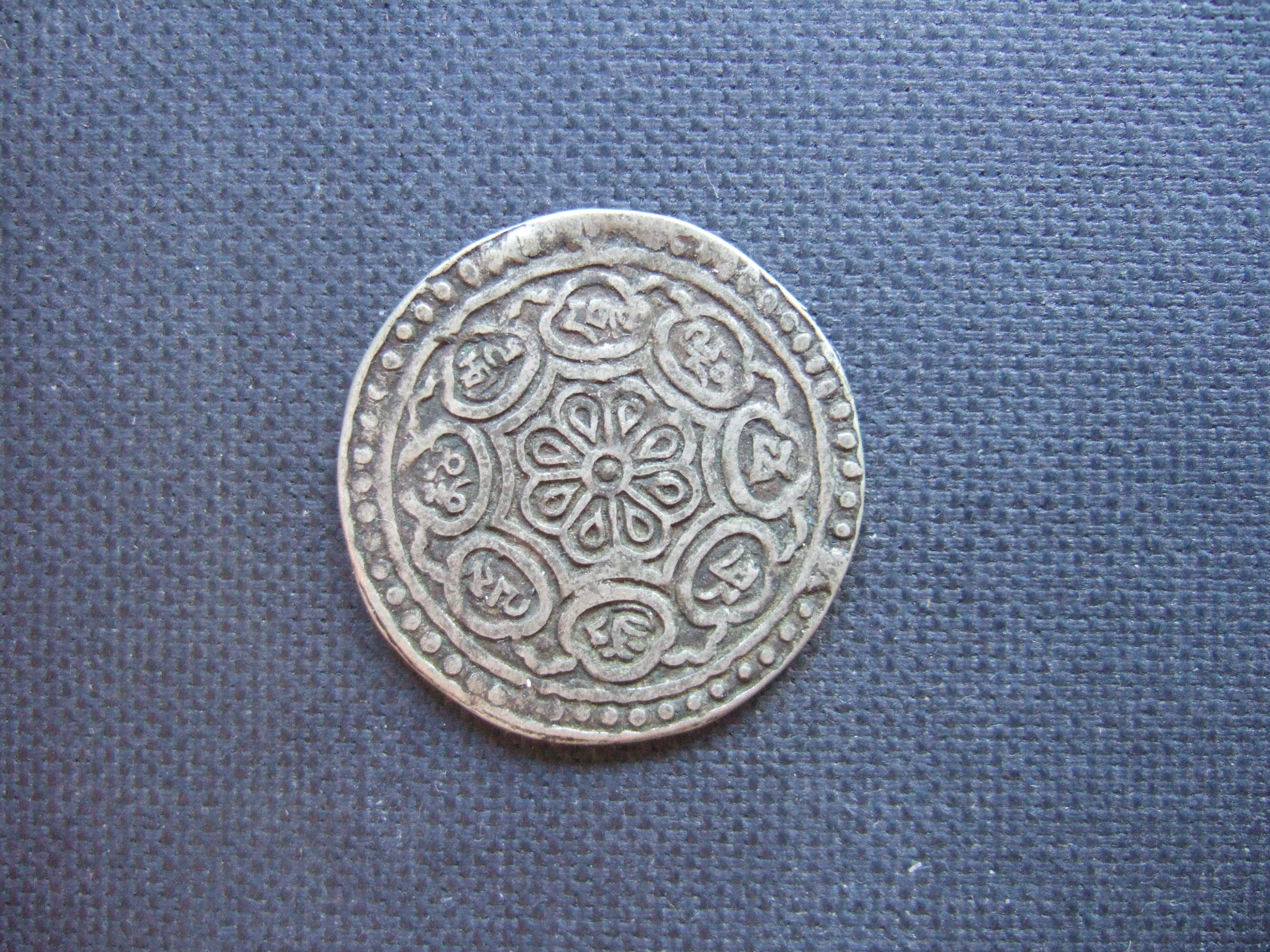
The Gaden tangka, which was used until 1948

== See also ==
- History of the rupee
- History of Chinese currency
- Denga
- Tenge
