= Skåre =

Skåre (or the historic spelling Skaare) may refer to:

== Places ==
- Skåre Municipality, a former municipality in Rogaland county, Norway
- Skåre Church, a church in the town of Haugesund in Rogaland county, Norway
- Skåre, Sweden, a town in Karlstad Municipality, Värmland County, Sweden

== People ==
- Skare (born 1999), French music artist and multi-platinum visual artist
- Arne Skaare (1907–1981), Norwegian politician for the Conservative Party
- Bjørn Skaare (1958–1989), Norwegian ice hockey player
- Jan Skåre (1929–2018), Norwegian judge
- Mats Lie Skåre, Norwegian songwriter and music producer
- Snøfrid Skaare (born 1939), Norwegian politician for the Conservative Party

== See also ==
- Skare, a village in Odda municipality, Hordaland county, Norway
- Skaar (disambiguation)
