= Scarred =

Scarred, past tense of scar, may refer to:

== Books ==
- Scarred: Experiments with Violence in Gujarat, a 2006 Indian non-fiction book by Dionne Bunsha
- Scarred, by Monica Dickens

== Music ==
- The Scarred, a punk rock band from Anaheim, California formed in 2003
- Scarred (album), a live album by English musician Gary Numan released in 2003
- Scarred (EP), a 2010 EP by aggrotech band Combichrist
- "Scarred", a song by Dream Theater from Awake
- "Scarred", a song by Iced Earth from The Dark Saga
- "Scarred", a song by Luther Campbell from Uncle Luke

== Film and television ==
- Scarred (film), a 1984 independent film
- Scarred (TV series), a program that debuted on MTV in 2007, which featured people being injured during stunts

== Other uses ==
- Scarred tree, a tree which has had bark removed by indigenous Australians for the creation of canoes, shelters, shields and containers

== See also ==
- Scar (disambiguation)
- SCAR (disambiguation)
- SCARS (disambiguation)
