= Tibetan skar =

Tibetan weight and monetary unit

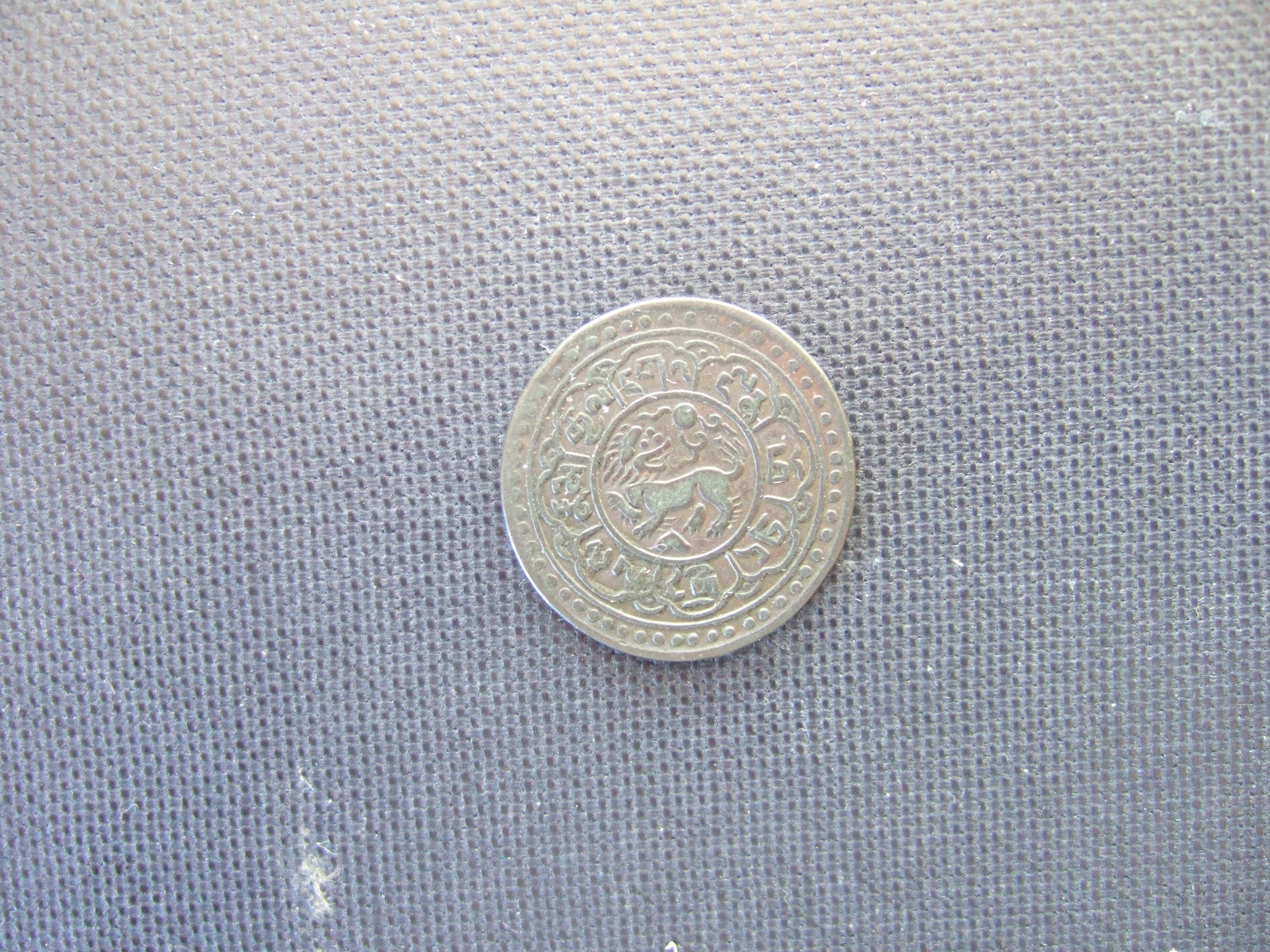
Two and half skar copper coin, dated 15-48 (= AD 1914), obverse

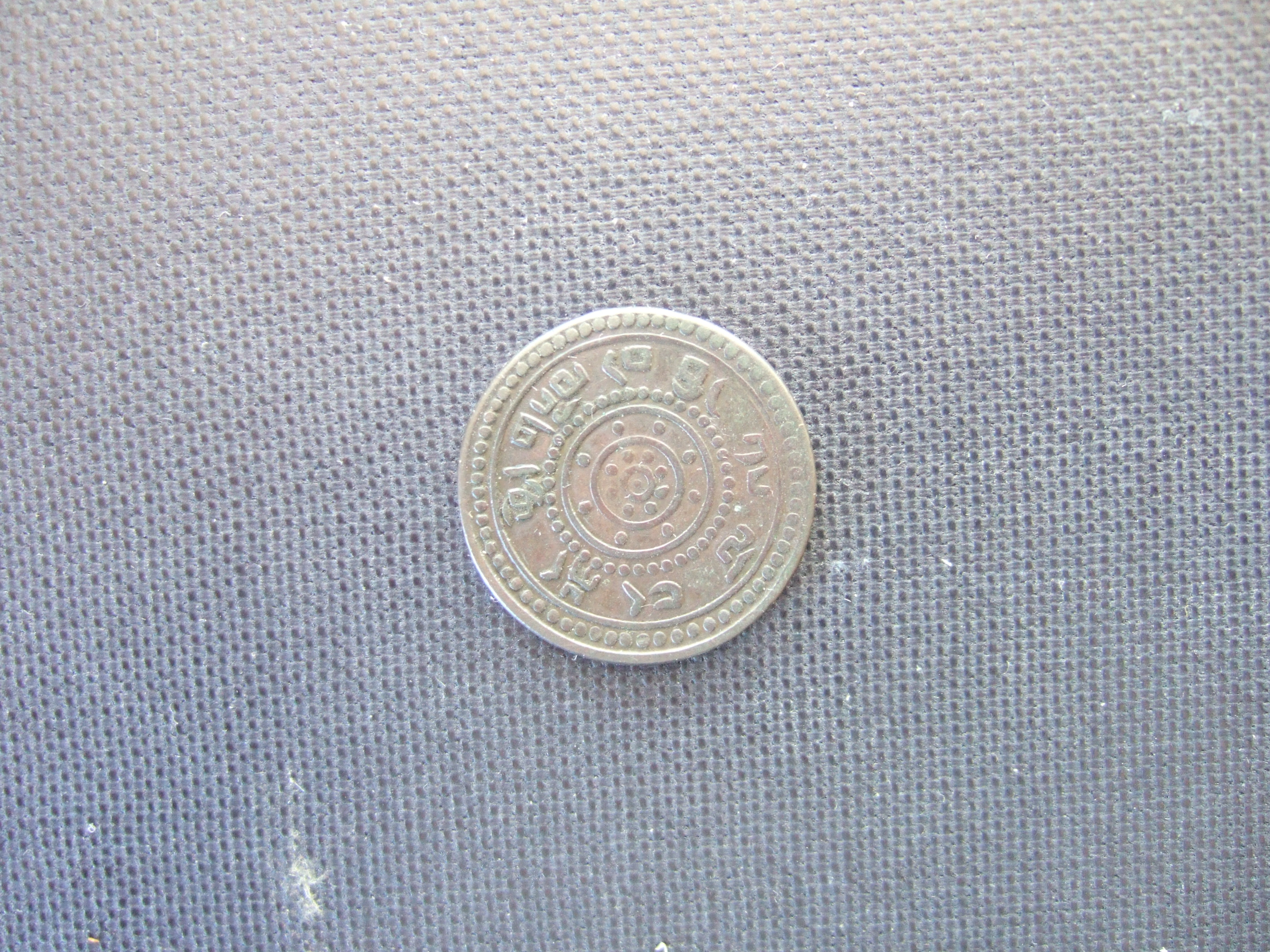
Two and half skar copper coin, dated 15-48 ( + AD 1914), reverse

The Tibetan skar was a weight unit representing a 100th part of one srang or the 10th part of one sho (i.e. about 0.37 g). The term was also used to refer to monetary units in the first half of the 20th century when copper coins were issued by Tibet (now People's Republic of China) which had the denominations 1/2, 1, 2 and half, 5 and 7 and half skar. One unit is referred to as skar gang in Tibetan.

== Mimangxogngü skar ==
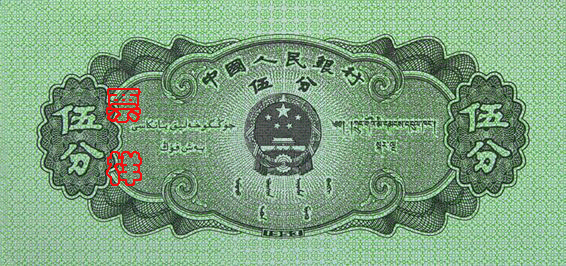
5 mimangxogngü skar banknote issued in 1953.

Since the 1950s, China has issued the homonymic mimangxogngü skar in Tibet, which is a synonym of renminbi fen. Since 1959, all traditional skar coins are substituted by Mimangxogngu skar.

== Original meaning ==
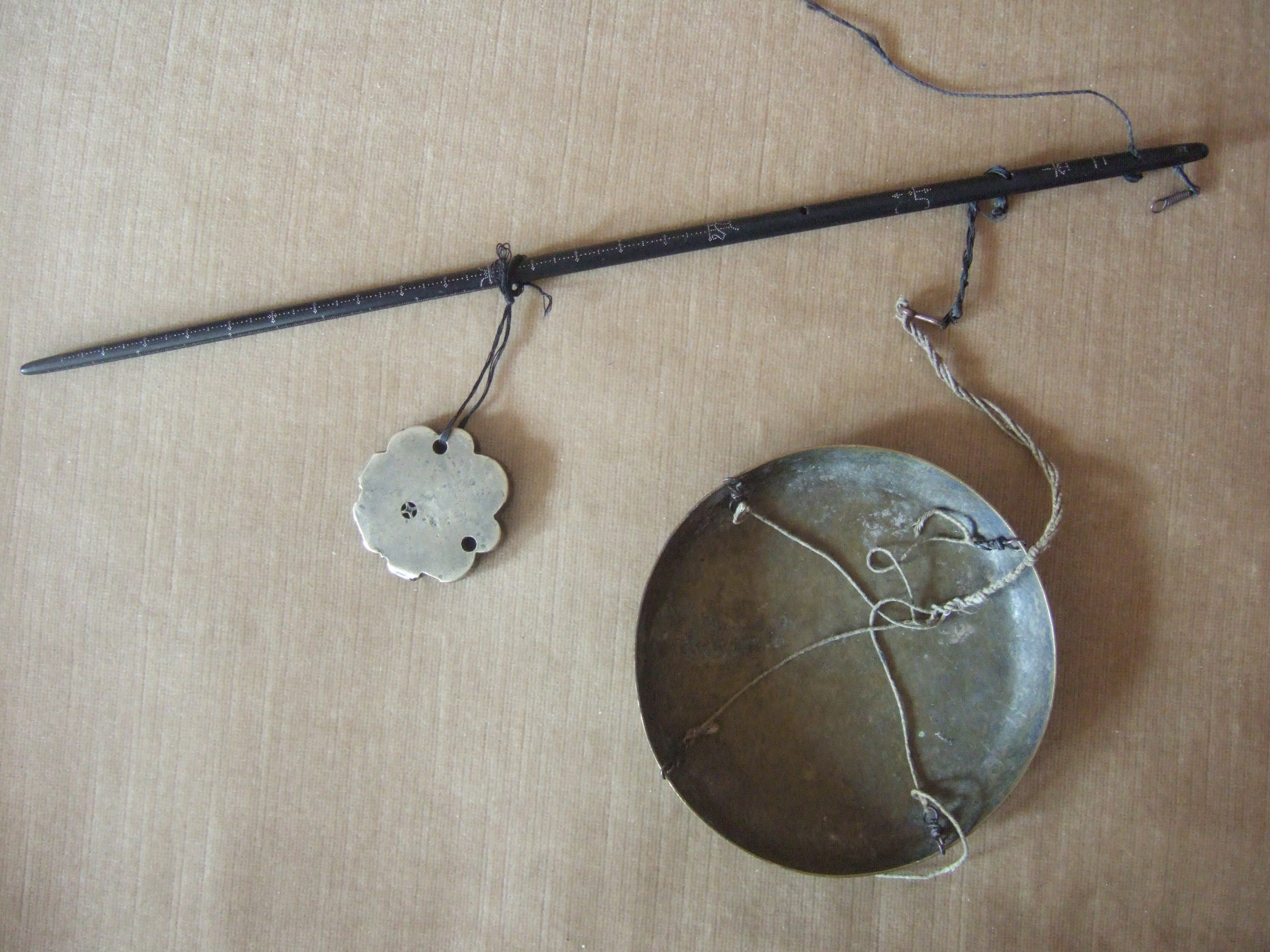
Tibetan or Chinese scale (steelyard balance) for weighing silver, red coral or other precious substances such as musk or turquoises. The beam is made of hardwood, the weight and the pan from bronze (early 20th century).

The original meaning of this term is "star" which referred to the small stars which were found as subdivisions on the horizontal bar of Tibetan and Chinese scales. The moving of the string with which the weight was suspended to the beam from one star to the next represented the weight of one skar.

== See also ==
- Historical money of Tibet
- Tibetan tangka
- Tibetan srang
