= Scar (disambiguation) =

A scar is a mark left behind after a wound has healed.

Scar(s) may also refer to:

== Places ==
- Scar, Orkney, a village on the island of Sanday, Orkney, Scotland, site of the Scar boat burial
- Scar Ridge, a summit in the White Mountains of New Hampshire, US

== Science ==
- Scar (physics), a fingerprint of quantum chaos
- Meander scar, a geological feature

== Arts and entertainment ==
=== Fictional characters ===
- Scar (Alien vs. Predator), a predator in the 2004 film Alien vs. Predator
- Scar (comics), a villain in the Green Lantern comics series
- Scar (Cylon), a Cylon Raider from the eponymous episode (see below) of Battlestar Galactica
- Scar (Fullmetal Alchemist), a character in the anime/manga series
- Scar (The Lion King), a lion from the film The Lion King
- Scar, leader of the Comanche tribe in the film The Searchers (1956)

=== Films ===
- The Scar (1919 film), a lost American silent film
- The Scar (1948 film) or Hollow Triumph, an American film directed by Steve Sekely
- The Scar (1976 film), a Polish film directed by Krzysztof Kieślowski
- Scar (film), a 2007 horror film starring Angela Bettis
- Scars (2006 film), a television docudrama starring Jason Isaacs
- Scars (2020 film), a short documentary film by Alex Anna

=== Literature ===
- Scar literature, a genre of Chinese literature
- The Scar (novel), a 2002 science fiction/fantasy book by China Miéville
- Scars, a novel for young adults by Cheryl Rainfield

=== Music ===
- Scars (band), a Scottish post-punk band
- Scars, a blues-rock band featuring Gary Moore

==== Albums ====
- Scar (Joe Henry album) or the title song, 2001
- Scar (Lush album), 1989
- Scars (Basement Jaxx album) or the title song, 2009
- Scars (Gary Moore album), by the blues-rock band Scars, 2002
- Scars (Soil album), 2001

==== Songs ====
- "Scar" (song), by Missy Higgins, 2004
- "Scars" (Allison Iraheta song), 2009
- "Scars" (James Bay song), 2015
- "Scars" (Lukas Graham song), 2020
- "Scars" (Natalie Imbruglia song), 2010
- "Scars" (Papa Roach song), 2005
- "Scars" (Stray Kids song), 2021
- "Scars" (Tove Lo song), 2016
- "Scars" (X Japan song), 1996
- "Scar", by All Saints from Studio 1, 2006
- "Scar", by American Hi-Fi from American Hi-Fi, 2001
- "Scar", by Ashton Irwin from Superbloom, 2020
- "Scar", by Foxes from All I Need, 2016
- "Scars", by Drake Jensen, 2012
- "Scars", by I Prevail from Lifelines, 2016
- "Scars", by Medina from Forever, 2012
- "Scars", by Miley Cyrus from Can't Be Tamed, 2010
- "Scars", by Rush from Presto, 1989
- "Scars", by Sam Smith from The Thrill of It All, 2017
- "Scars", by tobyMac from The Elements, 2018
- "Scars", by Vanilla Ice from Hard to Swallow, 1998
- "Scars", by Will Young from Lexicon, 2019
- "Scars", by Baby Keem from The Melodic Blue, 2021

=== Television ===
- Scar (TV series), a 2024 international television series

==== Television episodes ====
- "Scar" (Battlestar Galactica)
- "The Scar" (Fullmetal Alchemist)
- "Scars" (Agents of S.H.I.E.L.D.)
- "Scars" (The Dead Zone)
- "Scars" (Helstrom)
- "Scars" (Slow Horses)
- "Scars" (The Walking Dead)

== See also ==
- SCAR (disambiguation)
- Scarred (disambiguation)
- SCARS (disambiguation)
- Skar (disambiguation)
- Scarz
- Henry Scarr, an English shipbuilding company
