= SCARS =

SCARS or S.C.A.R.S. is an acronym that may refer to:

- SCARS (military) (Special Combat Aggressive Reactionary System), an American combat fighting system
- Severe cutaneous adverse reactions, often abbreviated as SCARs, i.e. the last letter is lower case
- S.C.A.R.S. (video game) (Super Computer Animal Racing Simulator), a video game featuring cars that are shaped like animals

== See also ==
- Scar (disambiguation)
- SCAR (disambiguation)
- Scarred (disambiguation)
