= Tibetan tangka =

Tibetan currency until 1941

The tangka (Tibetan: Tam or dngul Tam = silver tangka) was a currency of Tibet until 1941. It was subdivided into 15 skar or 1 1/2 sho and, from 1909, it circulated alongside the srang, worth 10 sho.

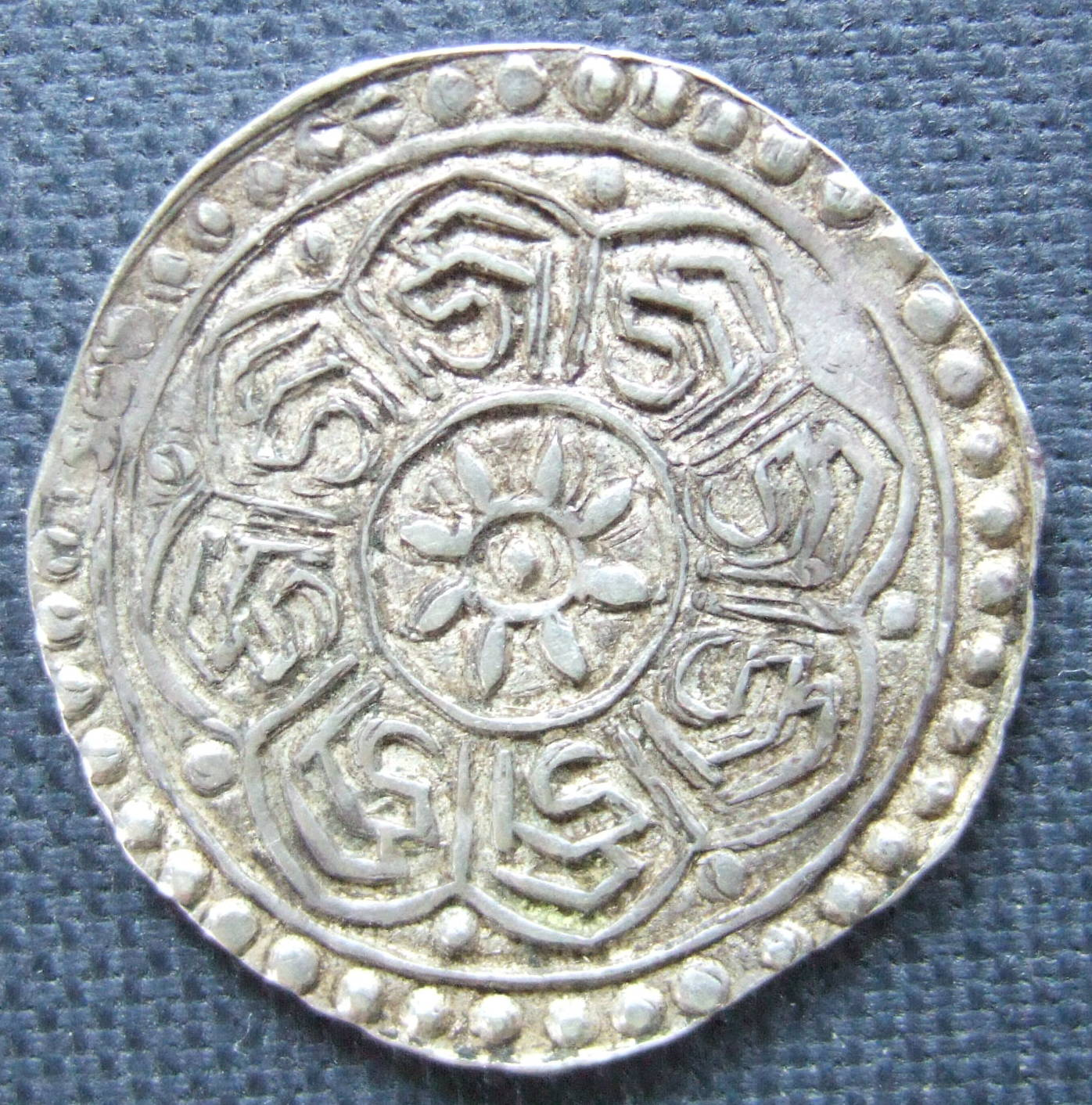
Tibetan undated silver tangka (2nd half of 18th century) with eight times the syllable "dza" in vartula script, obverse

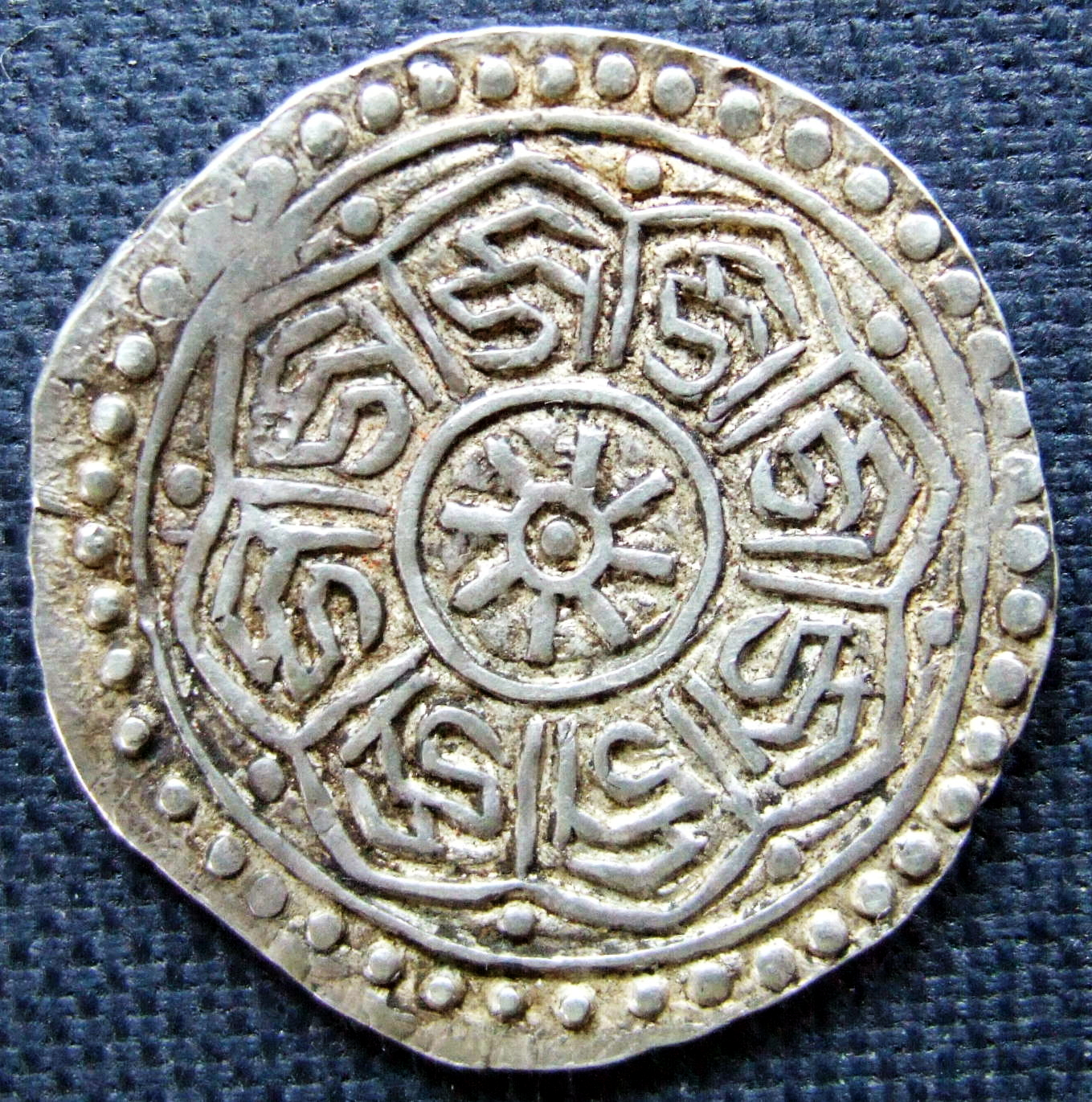
Tibetan undated silver tangka (2nd half of 18th century) with eight times the syllable "dza" in vartula script, reverse

== Coins ==
Coins struck to the tangka standard were first minted in 1763/64 and 1785 and in larger numbers from 1791 to 1948. They exhibit a wide array of varieties and yet maintain a consistent fabric and type.

=== Nepali tangkas and mohars for Tibet and the first Tibetan tangkas ===
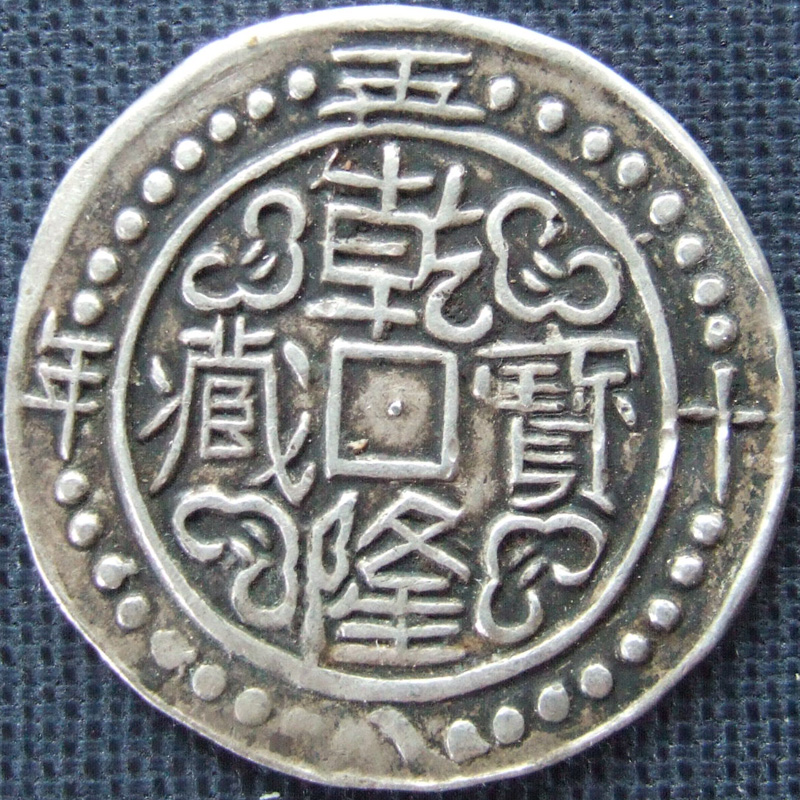
Sino Tibetan silver tangka, dated 58th year of Qian Long era, obverse. Weight 5.57 g. Diameter: 30 mm

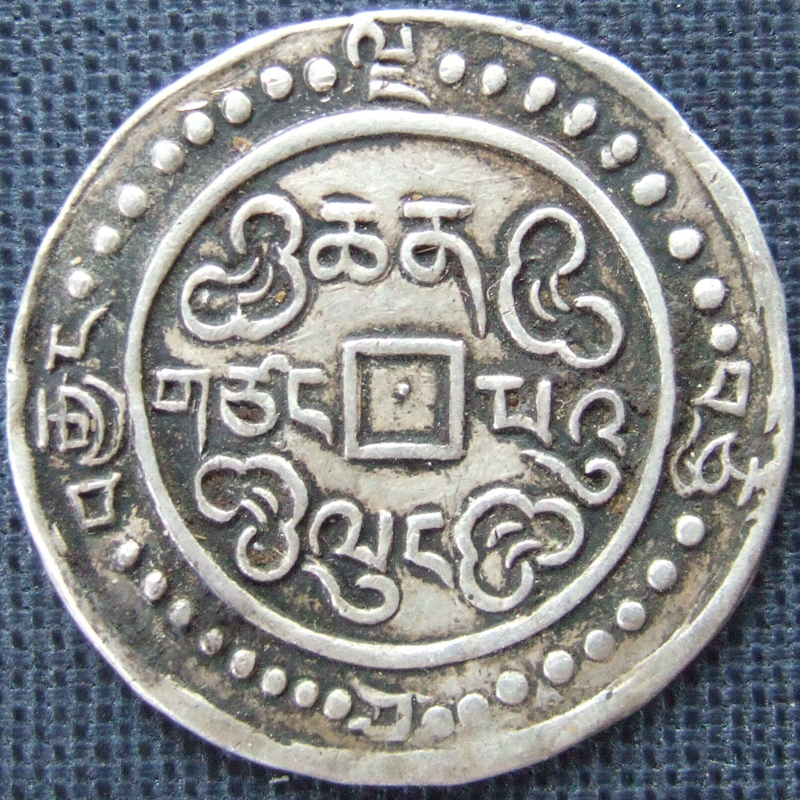
Sino Tibetan silver tangka, dated 58th year of Qian Long era, reverse. Weight 5.57 g. Diameter: 30 mm

The first tangkas were struck in Nepal from about 1640. From this period onwards many Nepali tangkas were exported to Tibet. Subsequently silver coins of a reduced weight standard, mohars, were struck by the kings of the three Malla kingdoms which shared the Kathmandu valley. In the 18th century special debased mohars were struck by Nepal for Tibet. In 1763/4 and 1785 the first tangkas were minted in Tibet. These followed the Nepali fabric and type with minor differences to assert their local origins. In 1791, the Tibetan government opened a mint and started striking the so-called kong par tangkas. Its operations were suspended two years later but it re-opened in about 1836.

=== Sino-Tibetan tangka ===
China opened another mint in Lhasa in 1792, where the minting of the Sino-Tibetan tangka took place in 1792 (only pattern tangkas with inscription in Tibetan only). The Sino-Tibetan tangkas, struck in 1793 bear an inscription in Chinese, which says, Qian Long Bao Tsang (Tibetan money of the Qian Long period) on one side and its transcription in Tibetan on the other side. Tangkas for general circulation were only struck in the 58th year of Qian Long. In the following years of this era and in the Jia Qing and Dao Guang eras only silver shos weighing about 3.7 g were struck. The last Sino-Tibetan issues of the 19th century are dated to the 16th year of the Dao Guang era (AD 1836).

=== Kong-par tangka ===
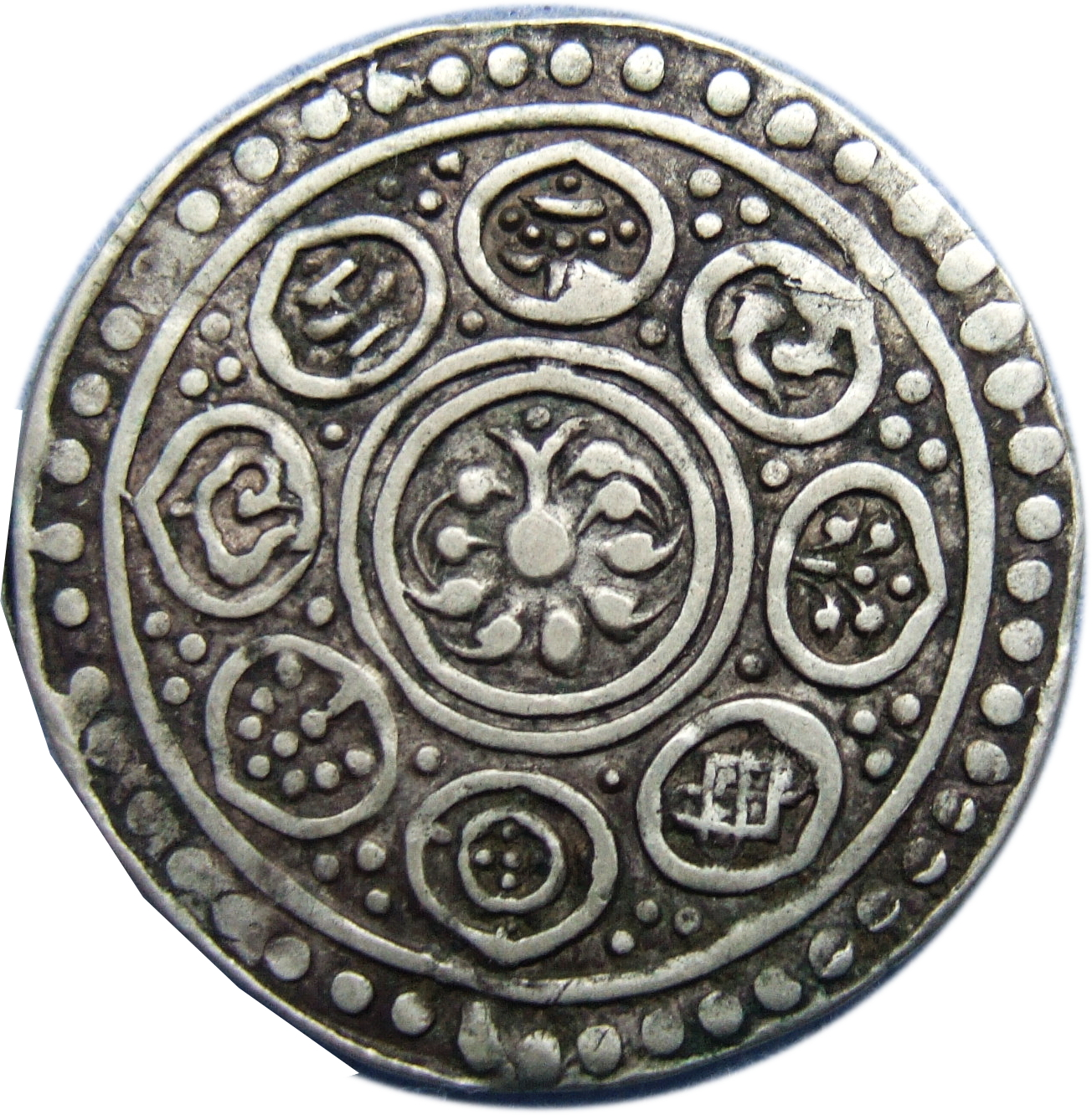
Tibetan kong par tangka, dated 13-45 (= AD 1791), reverse

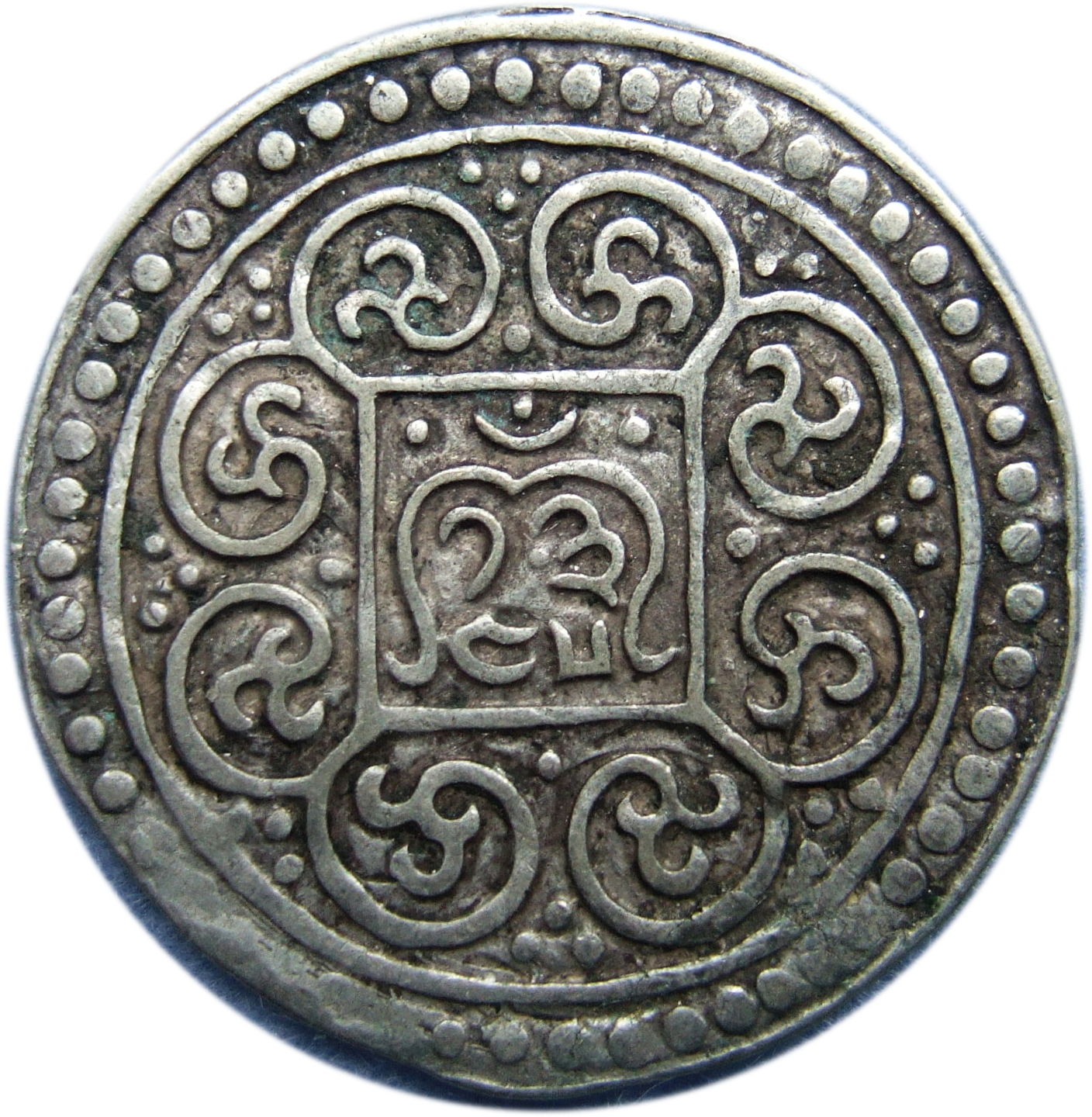
Tibetan kong par tangka, dated 13-45 (= AD 1791), obverse

The first indigenously minted Tibetan tangkas which were produced on a large scale are known as the Kong-par tangkas. The Kong-par tangkas were struck from 1791 to 1891. The design of these tangkas remained nearly invariable for several decades. Five different types can be identified based on details of design. Total five dates are found in these coins, 13-45 (1791), 13-46 (1792), 13-47 (1793), 15-24 (1890) and 15-25 (1891). Most of these coins bear the same date, 13-46 (1792) regardless of the year they were actually struck (numismatists refer to "frozen dates"). Two types of the Kong-par tangka dated 13-46 (1792) were actually struck in the 1840s and 1850s. On the obverse, these coins have an inner square with the date in it. The reverse of the coins display eight auspicious symbols of the Tibetan Buddhism, which surround a lotus in the inner circle.

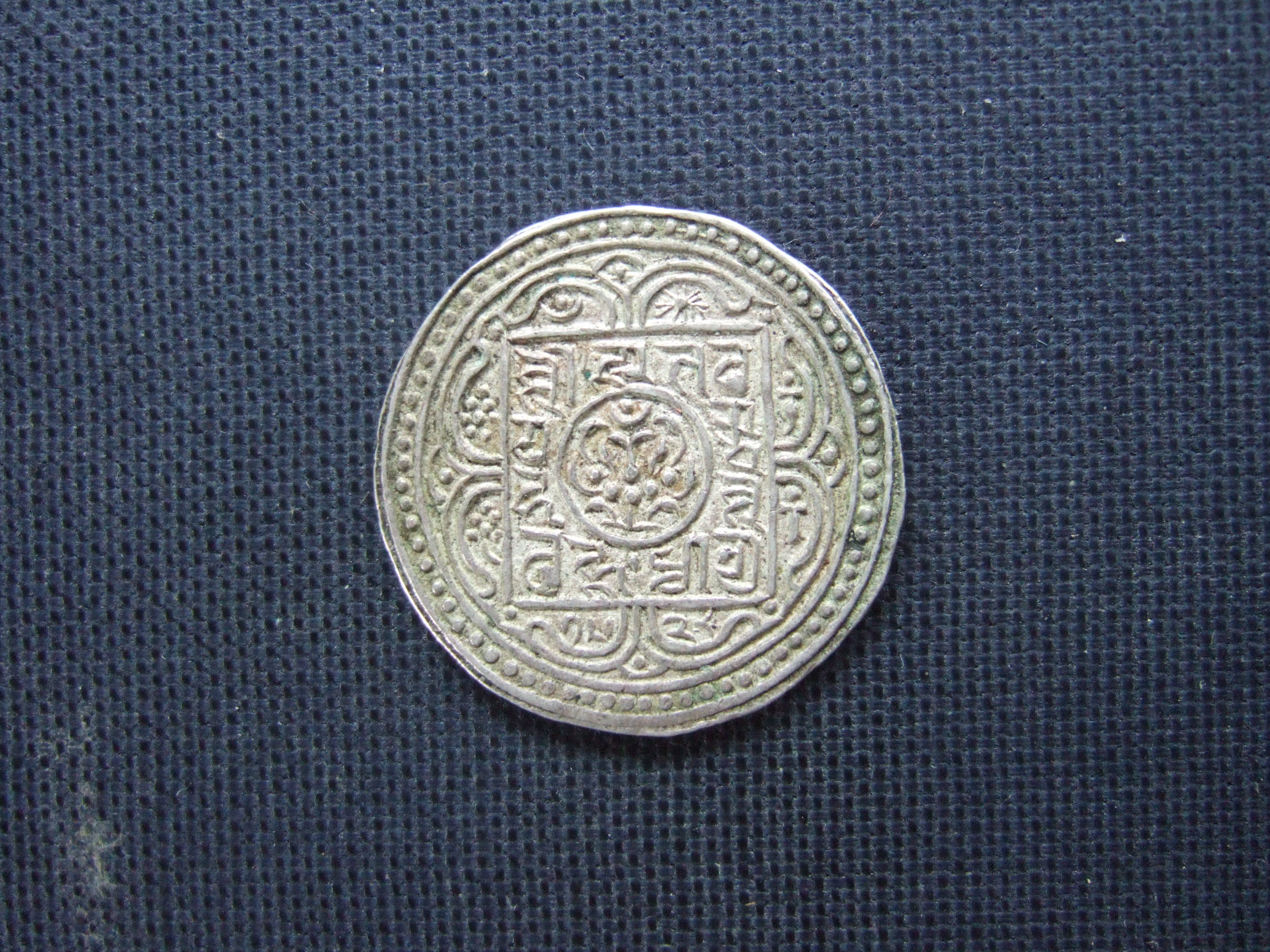
Tibetan silver tangka with Ranjana (Lantsa) script, dated 15-28 (= AD 1894), obverse

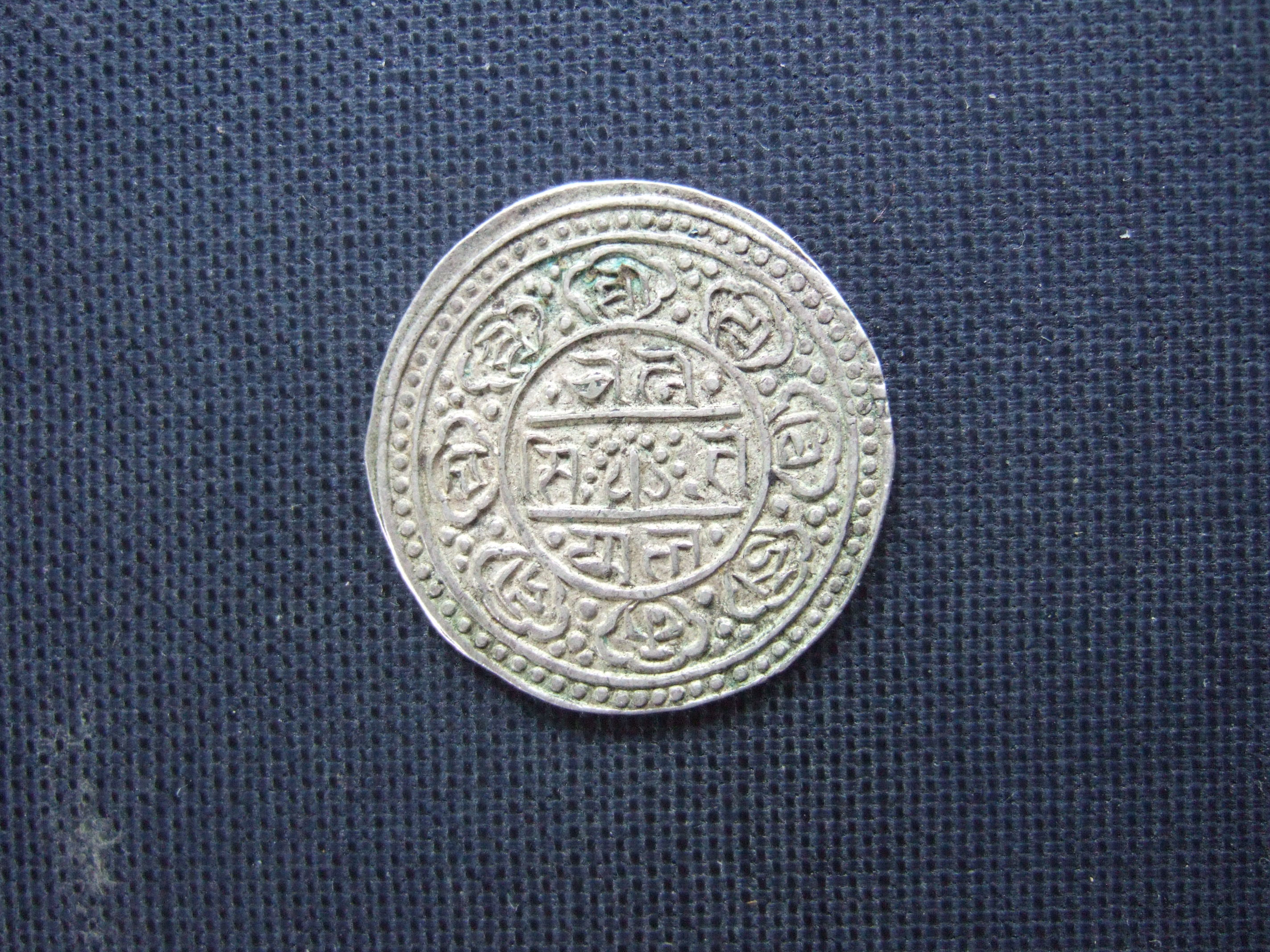
Tibetan silver tangka with Ranjana (Lantsa) script, dated 15-28 (= AD 1894), reverse

=== Tangka with Lantsa script ===
These tangkas have legends in the rarely used Lantsa script (also called Rañjana script) which has its origin in Nepal. Most probably they were originally struck for ceremonial purposes by Nepalese who were residing in Lhasa, but eventually entered into general circulation. Some have Tibetan cyclic dates like 15-28, 15-40, 15-46 (= AD 1894, 1906 and 1912), while others bear meaningless dates. There legends can be read with some difficulty and seem to represent mantras.

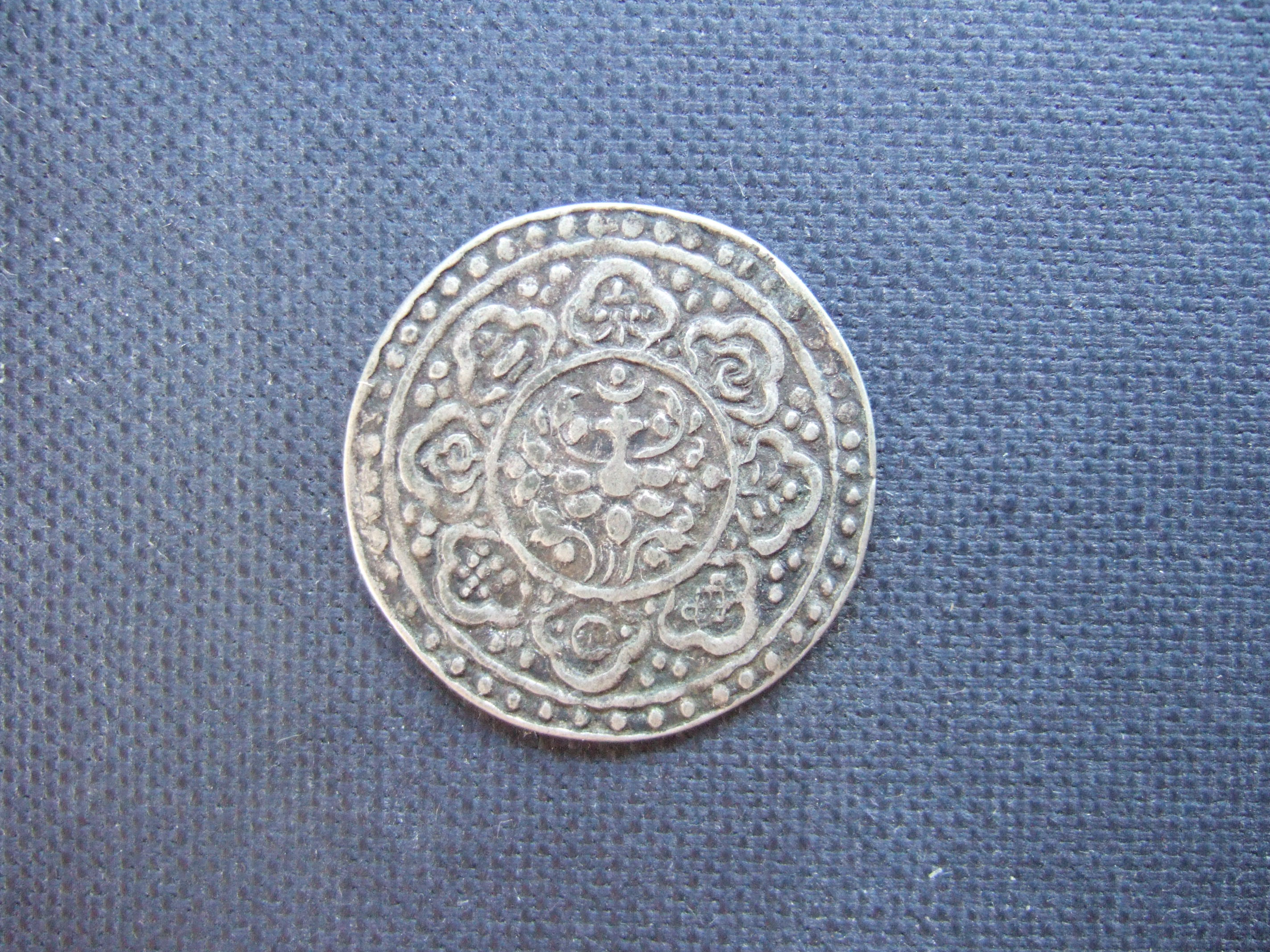
Tibetan "gaden" Tangka, undated (ca. AD 1840), obverse

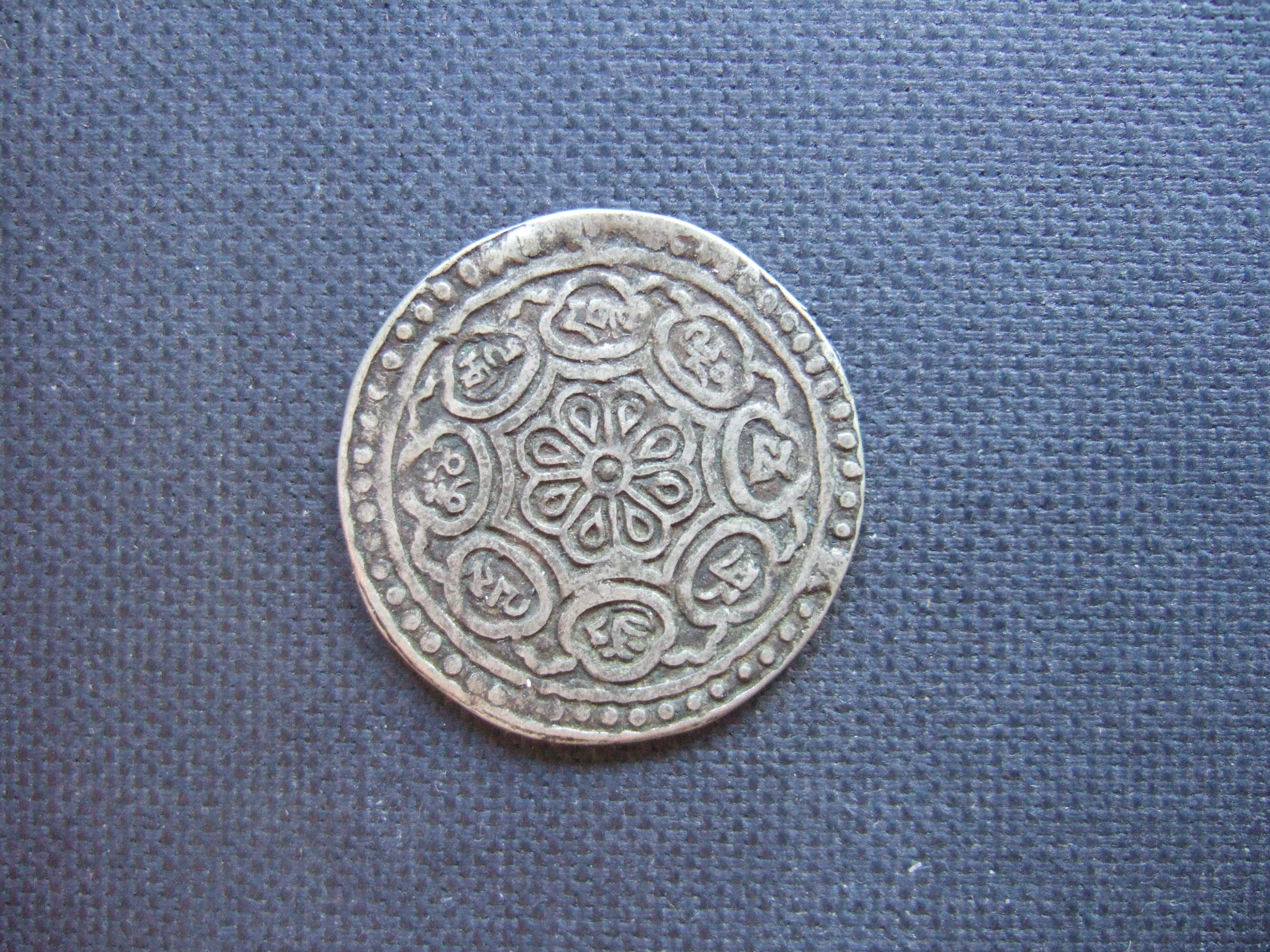
Tibetan "gaden" Tangka, undated (ca. AD 1840), reverse

=== Ga-den tangka ===
The Ga-den tangka date from c. 1850 and these were struck till 1948. Thirteen major varieties in design have been catalogued. In all, there are at least 37 known minor varieties, but possibly 50 or more that could be noted. The obverse of the coins show the eight auspicious symbols (Tibetan: bkra shis rtags brgad) of Tibetan Buddhism: umbrella of sovereignty, two golden fish of good fortune, amphora of ambrosia, lotus, conch shell, emblem of endless rebirth, banner of victory and wheel of empire. These are usually arrayed around a central lotus. Their actual order and specific designs varied over time. The two sides of the coin have the same orientation. Starting from the top, the legend in Tibetan on the reverse says: dga'-ldan pho-brang-phyod-las-rnam-rgyal (The Palace of Ga-den is victorious in all directions). The legend is written in such a way as to fit into eight circles. These are actually derived from an earlier style in which the characters were inside lotus petals.

=== Kelzang tangka ===
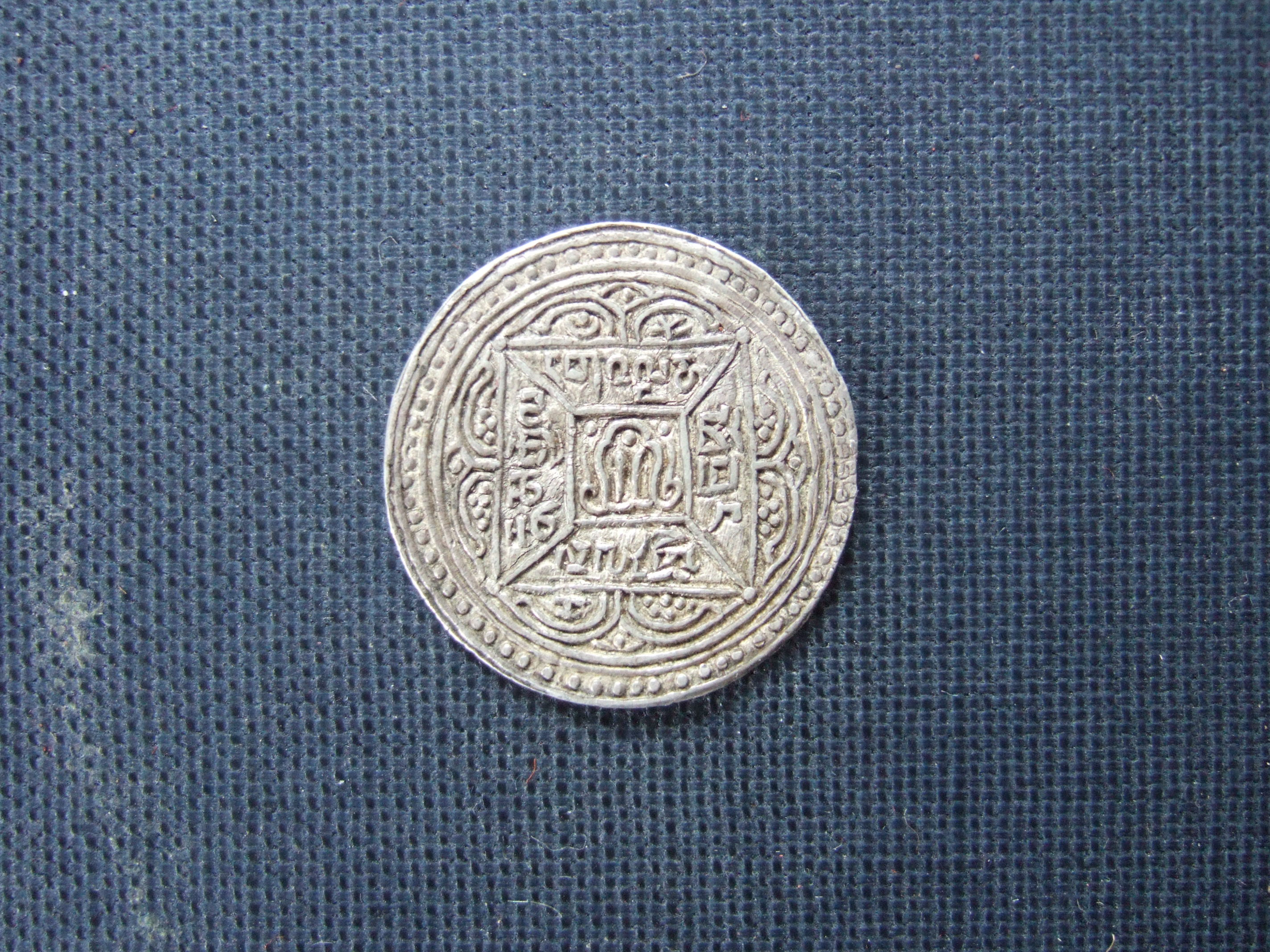
Undated Kelzang tangka (1910), obverse

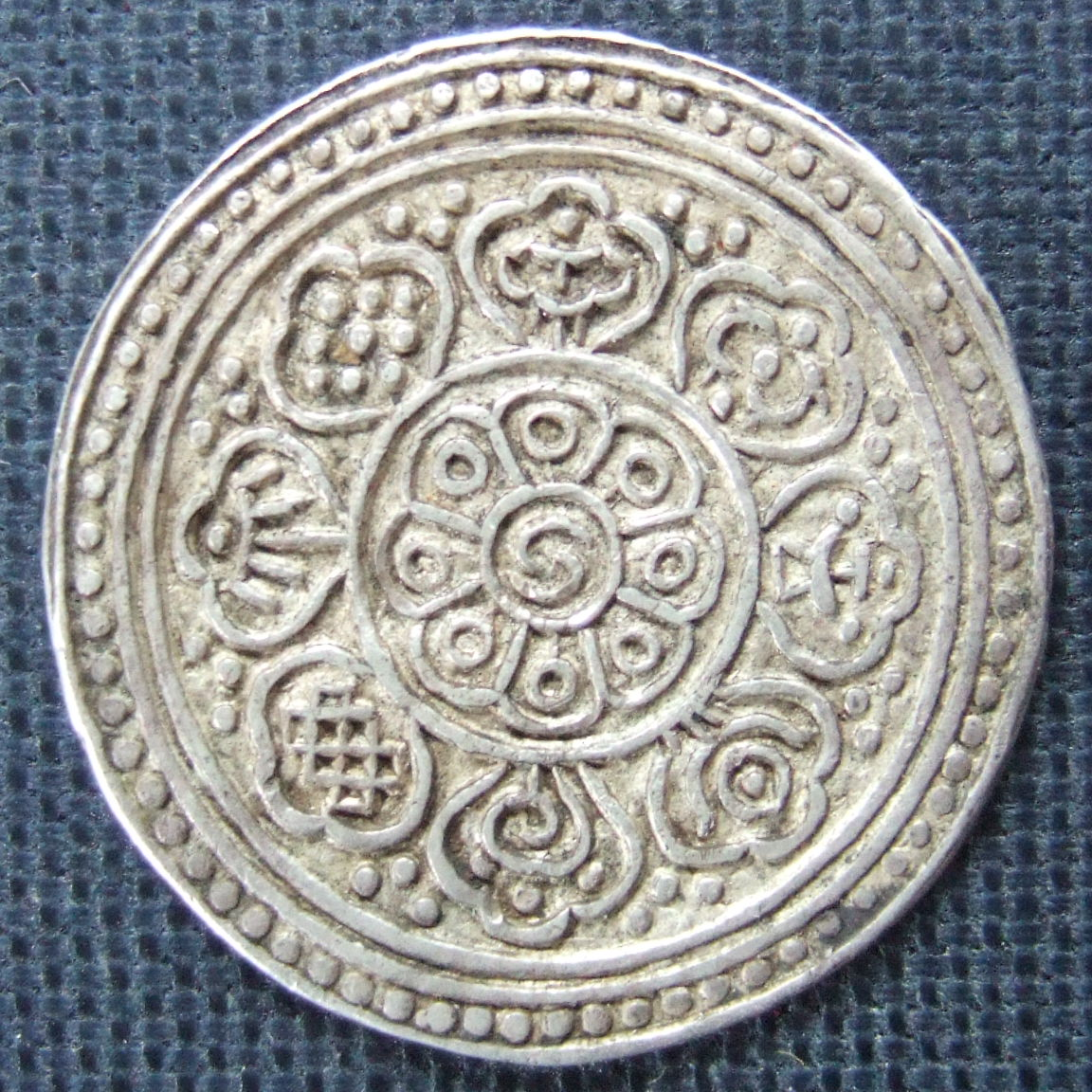
Undated Kelzang tangka (1910), reverse

This special tangka, struck in better silver than the normal Gaden tangkas, was distributed to monks during the Monlam Festival ("Great Prayer" Festival) in early 1910. The distribution most probably took place in the Kelzang Palace (Tibetan: bskal bzang bde skyid pho brang) which is located in the Norbulingka, the park and summer palaces of the Dalai Lamas in Lhasa. The coin may have taken its name from this palace which had been built by the 7th Dalai Lama Kalzang Gyatso.

=== Last Tibetan silver coin ===
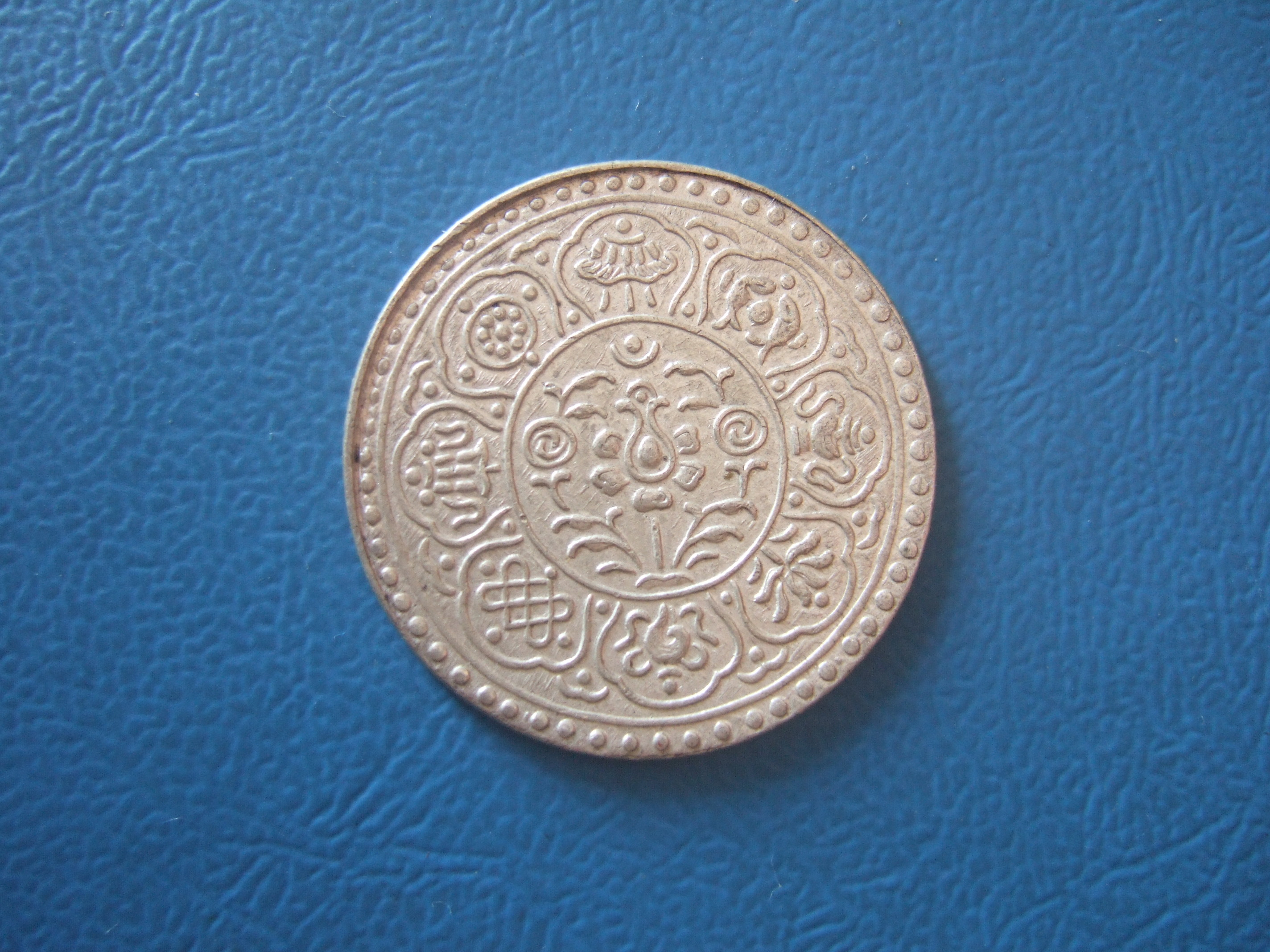
Tibetan undated silver tangka, struck in 1953/54, obverse.

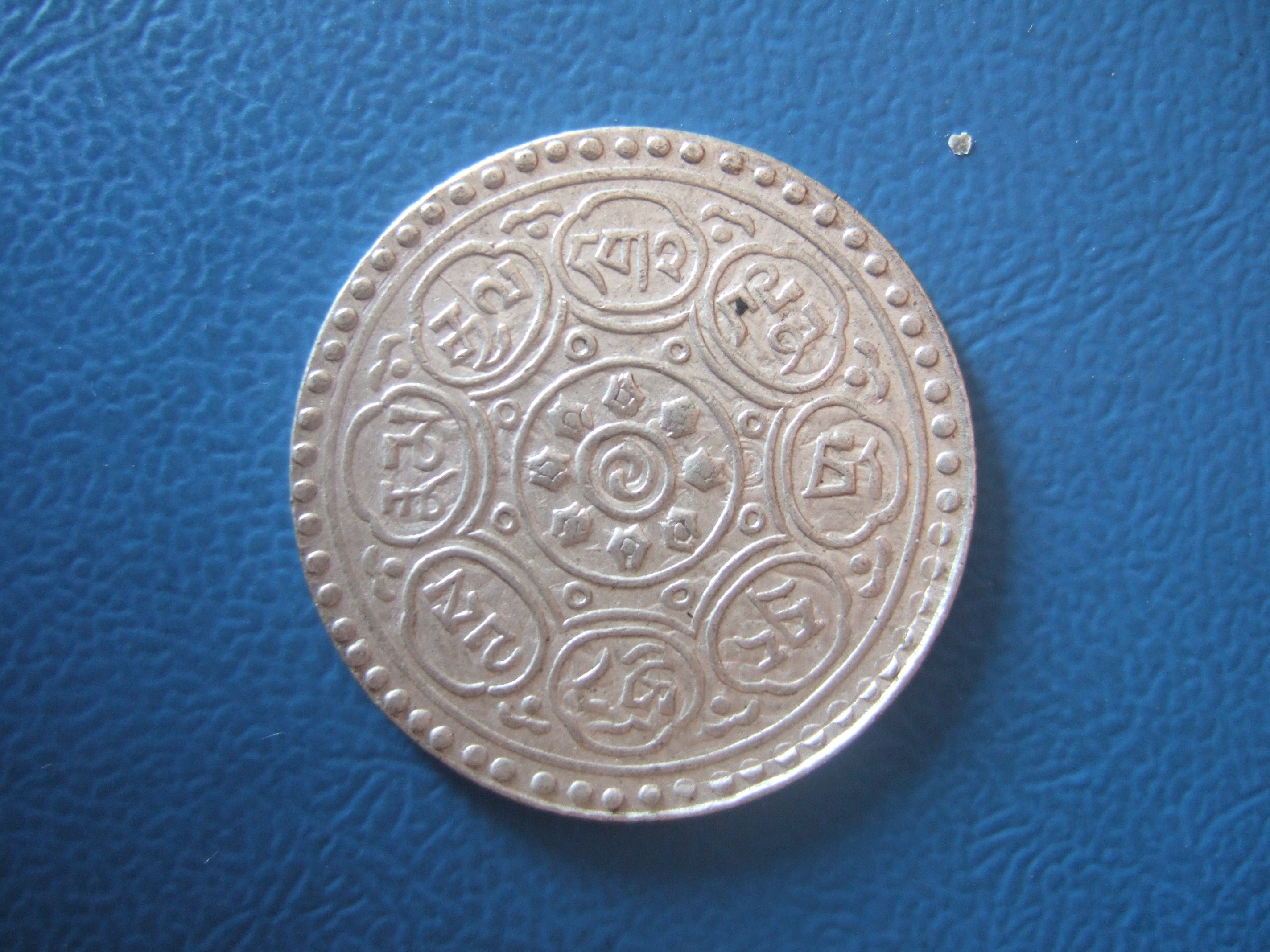
Tibetan undated silver tangka, struck in 1953/54, reverse.

An undated silver coin in the style of the earlier Gaden tangkas was struck on modern coin presses in 1953/54 for distribution to monks. It is the last silver coin which was issued in Tibet, and it circulated at the value of 5 srang, although its design is that of a tangka. The reverse depicts a wheel with eight spokes representing the „wheel of law“ (Sanskrit: dharmachakra, Tibetan chos ’khor) which was set in motion by the Buddha. In the centre of the wheel two comma-shaped elements represent what the Tibetans call norbu dga’ khyil („whorling jewel of joy“). This coin was struck in high grade silver and had the popular name tangka dkarpo gsar pa („new white tangka“).

=== Mints and metals ===
The earliest known series of the tangka and probably also the early Sino-Tibetan coins were struck in the Lhasa mint, located in Shol, below the Potala, from 1763 onwards. The first issues of the Kong-par tangkas were minted in Kongpo province. In the 20th century, four mints issued the Tibetan tangka in volume: Dodpal, Dode, Ser-Khang and Tapchi. In 1881, an edict was issued ordering that no discrimination to be made between the fake and the genuine tangka, thus the unofficially struck coins also became the legal tender. Differences in type and fabric of these coins are minor and there are no mintmarks. The Kong-par tangkas bear dates but the denomination is not mentioned on these coins. The Ga-den tangkas do not bear any date. Initially the coins were minted in silver, but later these were minted in billon. Silver 2 tangka coins were issued by Dodpal mint once in 1912, whose design was similar to the Ga-den tangka.

== Banknotes ==
Banknotes were issued between 1912 and 1941 in denominations of 5, 10, 15, 25 and 50 tam (tangka).

== See also ==
- History of the taka
- Historical money of Tibet
- Postage stamps and postal history of Tibet
- Tibetan srang
- Tibetan skar
- Nepalese mohar
