= 2.25-Inch Sub-Caliber Aircraft Rocket =

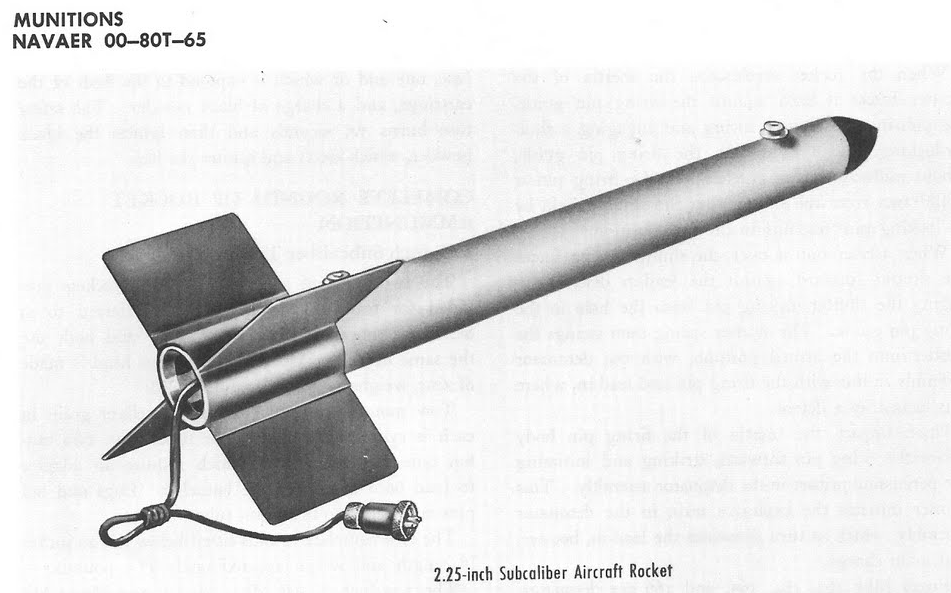
- Type: Training rocket
- Place of origin: United States

Service history
- Used by: United States Navy

Specifications
- Mass: 80 pounds (36 kg)
- Length: 29.93 inches (760 mm)
- Diameter: 2.25 inches (57 mm)
- Wingspan: 5.87 inches (149 mm)
- Warhead: Solid, made from steel, zinc die cast, or cast iron
- Engine: Mk 15 Mod 0 or Mk 15 Mod 2 solid-fuel rocket
- Propellant: Mk 16 Mod 1
- Maximum speed: 770 mph (1,240 km/h)
- Guidance system: None

The 2.25-Inch Sub-Caliber Aircraft Rocket, or SCAR, was an American unguided rocket developed by the United States Navy during World War II and used for sub-caliber rocket training. Capable of simulating the aerial rockets then coming into operational service, the SCAR was used to train pilots in the use of the new type of weapon, and continued in service throughout the 1950s.

== Development ==
With the introduction of the 3.5-Inch and 5-Inch Forward Firing Aircraft Rockets, a need arose to train aircraft pilots in the proper tactics for the use of the new weapons. This requirement resulted in the development of a dedicated training rocket by the U.S. Navy

Designated 2.25-Inch Sub-Caliber Aircraft Rocket, the resulting rocket was a joint project between the Bureau of Ordnance and the National Defense Research Committee. As its name implied, the rocket was designed as a sub-calibre weapon compared to the FFAR, being only 2.25 inches (57 mm) in diameter, but weighted to be ballistically similar to the larger operational weapons. Varying the amount of propellant in the SCAR's motor could produce accurate simulations of either type of FFAR's flight characteristics.

== Operational history ==
SCAR in 1948

Following development, SCAR entered full-scale production in January 1945; by July, fully half of the U.S. Navy's rocket production for aircraft use consisted of SCAR rockets. SCAR was widely used during the latter part of World War II as a training round for the FFAR and, later, the High Velocity Aircraft Rocket.

Following the end of the war, it remained in production, continuing in operational service throughout the 1950s. Budget cutbacks prior to the outbreak of the Korean War meant that the SCAR was the only rocket used in training by the majority of pilots.

Despite its small size, SCAR could be hazardous; in 1957, an injury aboard the aircraft carrier USS Kearsarge was caused by the unintended ignition of a SCAR rocket. As recently as 2004, expended SCAR rockets were still occasionally being found in areas that had been used as bombing ranges during World War II.
