= Scar (TV series) =

- Cicatriz
- Genre: Thriller, Action, Adventure
- Created by: Pablo Roa, Verónica Marzá
- Based on: Cicatriz by Juan Gómez-Jurado
- Written by: Pablo Roa
- Directed by: Miguel Ángel Vivas
- Starring: Milena Radulović, Luis Fernández, Juanlu González, Stefan Kapičić, Mladen Sovilj, Maciej Stuhr, Goran Šušljik, Julen Serrano, Manel Llunell, Pelageja Markova, Alina Petrova, Alina Petrova, Lucía Martín Abello
- Countries of origin: Spain, Mexico, France, Serbia
- Original languages: Spanish, Russian
- No. of seasons: 1
- No. of episodes: 8

Production
- Production companies: Plano a Plano, Dopamina

Original release
- Network: La 1
- Release: 26 August – 23 September 2024

Scar is an international television series that was coproduced by Spain, Mexico, France, and Serbia. It's based on the 2016 novel "Scar" (Cicatriz) by Juan Gómez-Jurado. It stars Juanlu González, Milena Radulović, Luis Fernández, Thaïs Blume, Stefan Kapičić, and many others.

The first episode premiered on 21 August 2024, and the last episode premiered on 23 September 2024.

== Plot ==
Cicatrix is an action thriller that explores themes of love, survival, family, and belonging.

It is a love story that began with lies and a scar on the cheek, and that affects the lives of its two protagonists.

== Cast ==
=== Main cast ===
- Milena Radulović as Irina Topalova.
- Juanlu González as Simón.
- Luis Fernández as Tomás.
- Stefan Kapičić as Boris Spasky.
- Mladen Sovilj as Vanya.
- Maciej Stuhr as Jakub Sanders.
- Goran Šušlijik as El Afgano.
- Julen Serrano as Arturo.
- Manel Llunell as Tato.
- Pelageja Markova as Little Irina.
- Alina Petrova as Irina/Irina Hijo Oksana.
- Lucía Martín Abello as Marcia.
- Thaïs Blume as Cynthia.
- Monika Kowalska as Ania Secretaria Sanders/Anna Secretaria Sanders.
- Ramiro Alonso as Inspector Ramos.
- Ferri Ballester as Manuela.

=== Guests ===
- Elisabeth Larena as Tere.
- Karina Kolokolchykova as Oskana.

== Production ==
Production began in 2022. The following year, a Serbian telecommunication company Telekom Srbija and a French group Asacha Media Group joined the project. In the following weeks RTVE and La 1 joined the production as broadcasting and streaming services.

In the fall of 2023, the main cast was announced and shooting began in Bilbao, Spain, and Belgrade, Serbia.

== Release ==
The first chapter of the series broadcast in August 2024. The first season is available on RTVE.

== Official Sites ==
- "Cicatriz - Episodio 1: Cicatriz - RTVE Play". 10 September 2024 – via www.rtve.es.
- "Cicatriz on Instagram". www.instagram.com.
