= Skaar =

Skaar may refer to:

- Skaar (character), a fictional character from Marvel Comics
- Skaar Ridge, a ridge on the southeast side of Mount Augusta in Queen Alexandra Range

== People with the surname ==
- Andrew O. Skaar (1922–2018), American farmer and politician
- Bjørn Johnny Skaar (born 1971), Norwegian politician
- Bryn Christopher or Skaar, British singer
- Eric P. Skaar (born 1974), American microbiologist
- Johannes Skaar (1828–1904), Norwegian bishop and hymnologist
- Nils Nilsson Skaar (1852–1948), Norwegian teacher, farmer and editor
- Skaar (singer) (born 1998), Norwegian singer-songwriter
- Tina Røe Skaar (born 1993), Norwegian taekwondo practitioner

== See also ==
- Scarr
- Skaare
- Skåre
