= Tibetan srang =

Currency of Tibet

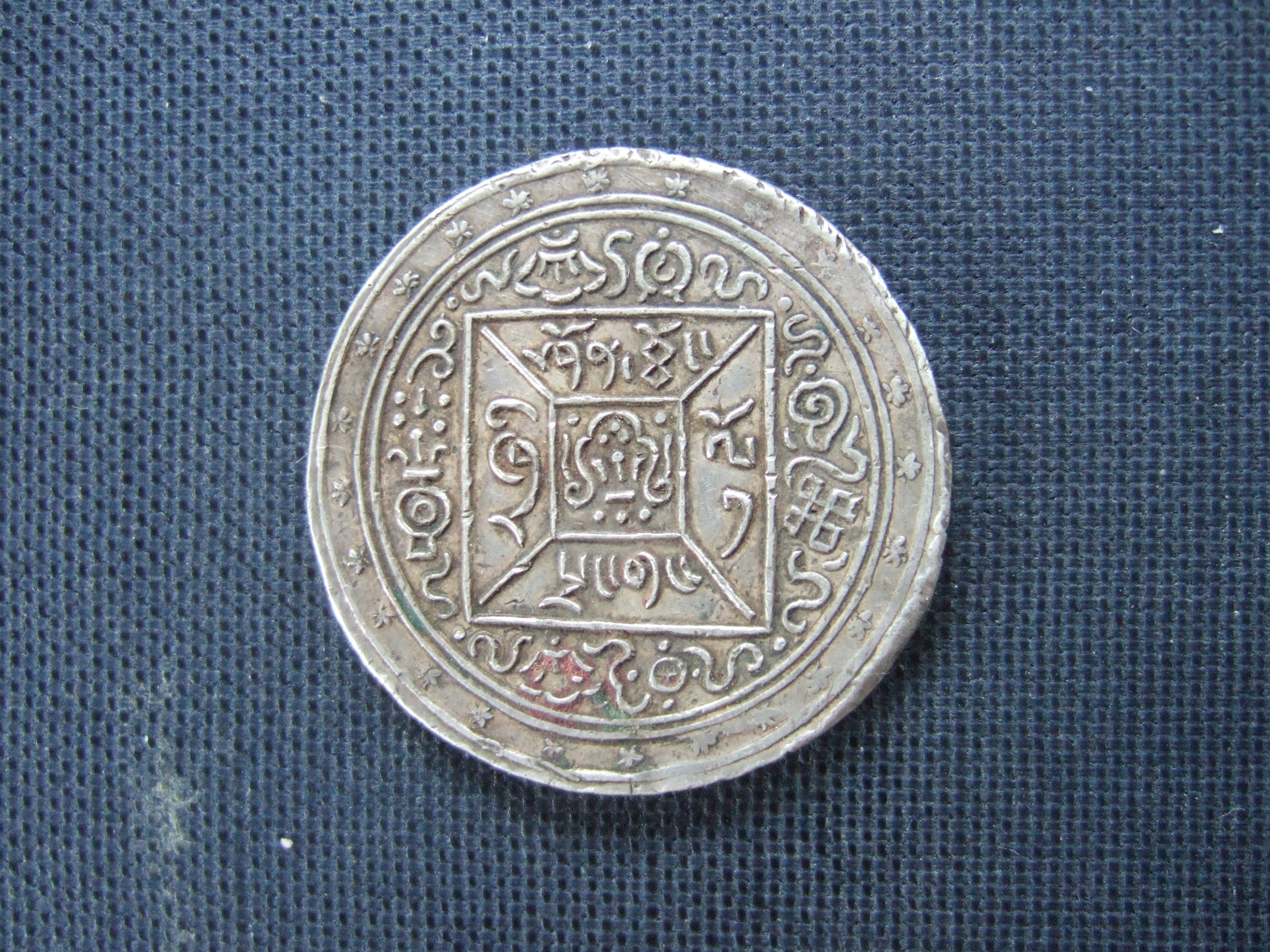
Tibetan 1 Srang silver coin, dated year 1 of Xuan Tong era ( = AD 1909), obverse. Inscription: shon thong/ kri lo 1/ sranggang ("One srang of throne year 1 of Xuan Tong")

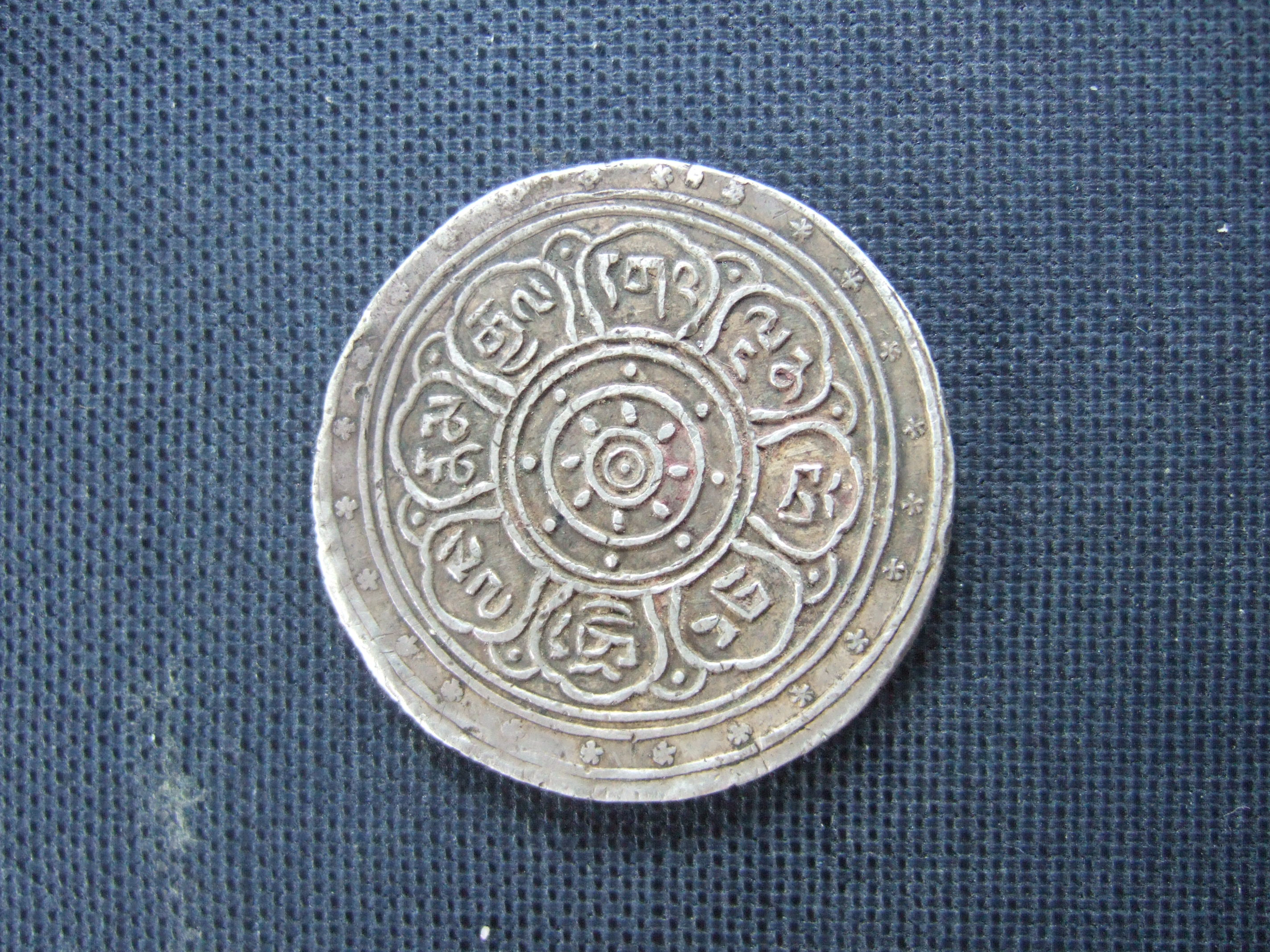
Reverse

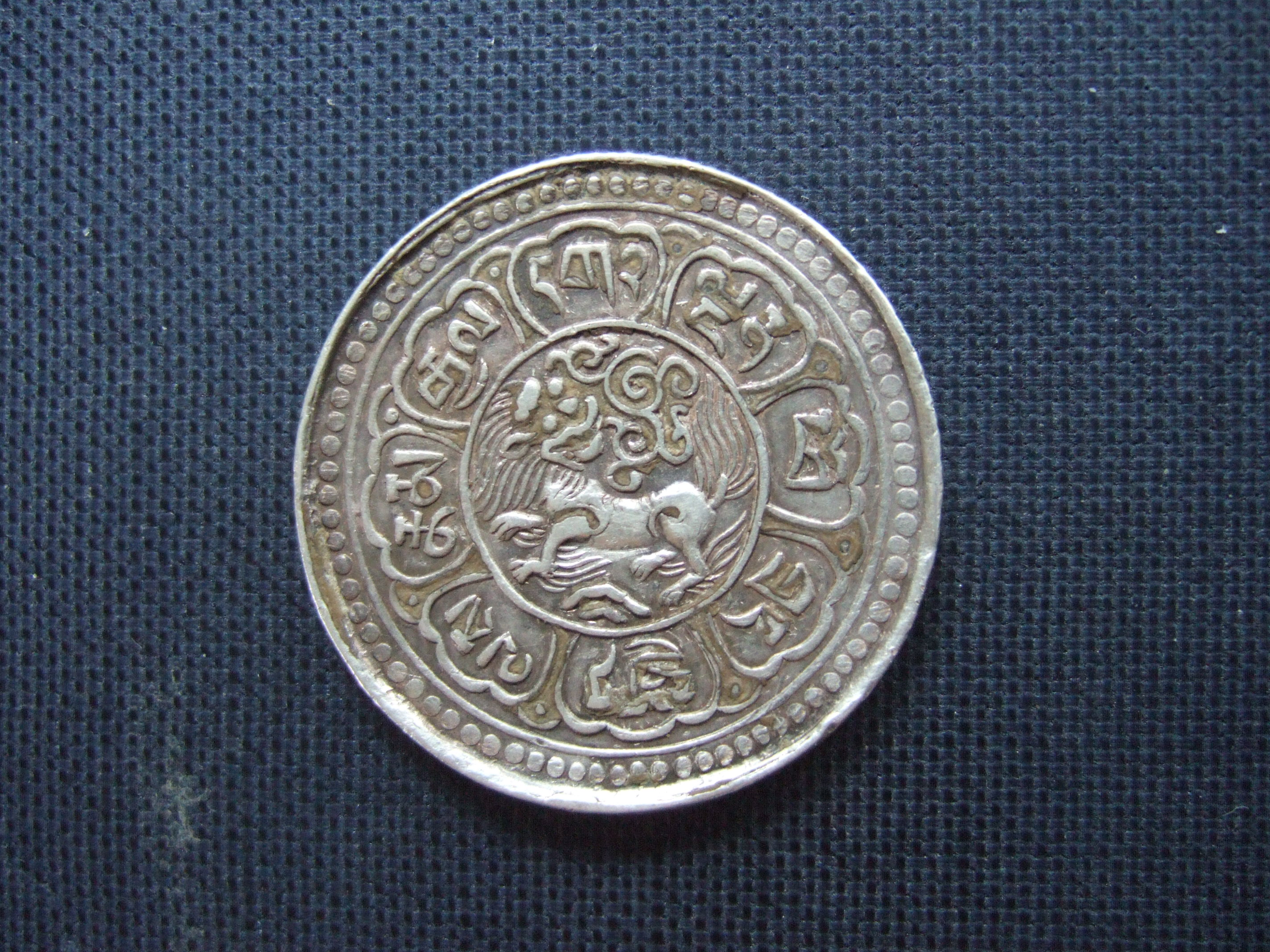
Tibetan 1 Srang silver coin, dated 15–53 (= AD 1919), obverse. Inscription: dga' ldan pho brang choD las rnam rgyal ("The Gaden Palace, victorious in all directions" = residence of the Dalai Lamas in the Dreprung monastery and, in a wider sense, "Tibetan Government")

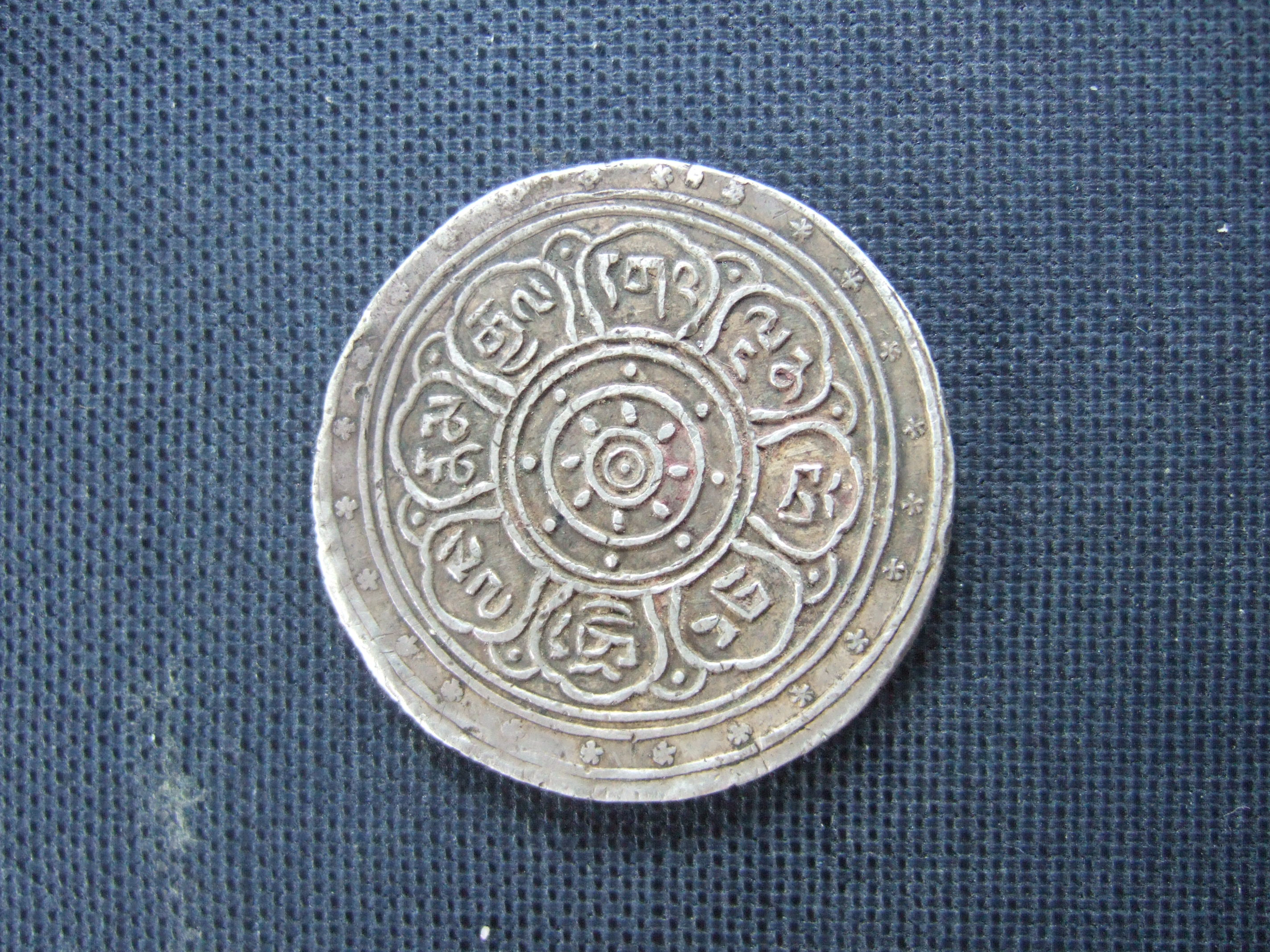
Reverse

The srang (pronounced "sang"; in Tibetan often referred to as "dngul srang" i.e. "silver srang") was a currency of Tibet between 1909 and 1959. It circulated alongside the tangka until the 1950s. It was divided into 10 sho, each of 10 skar, with the tangka equal to 15 skar (1 srang = 6 2/3 tangka). In 1959, the Chinese central government replaced the srang with the renminbi at a rate of 50 paper srang per yuan, in which the srang ceased to be legal tender.

Originally, the srang was a weight unit, particularly for weighing silver and gold. It was equivalent to the Chinese liang (tael), i.e. to about 37.5 grams.

The srang first appeared as a silver coin in 1909 when Tibet began issuing a variety of denominations rather than only issuing the tangka. These 1 srang silver coins of 18.5 g were minted at Dode. The 1 srang coins were struck till 1919. Silver 1 1/2 srang coins of 5 g were struck in Tapchi mint between 1936 and 1938 and again in 1946. Silver 3 srang coins of 11.3 g were struck in Tapchi mint between 1933 and 1938 and again in 1946. Billon coins of 10 srang were issued by the Dogu mint between 1948 and 1952. Gold coins of 20 srang were struck in the Ser-Khang mint between 1918 and 1921. In 1939, the first Tibetan banknotes appeared denominated in srang (notes of 100 "tam srang"; later the denomination was changed from "tam srang" to "srang"). Subsequently, the Tibetan government issued banknotes of 5, 10 and 25 srang.

In 1954, a silver coin was struck for distribution to monks. Although this coin was the last tangka issue, it was valued at 5 srang and was the last silver coin to be struck in Tibet.

The last Tibetan copper coins (5 sho = 1/2 srang) were issued in 1953, while 100 srang notes were issued in large numbers until 1959.

== See also ==
- Historical money of Tibet
- Tibetan tangka
